= Aedes katherinensis =

Scientific classification
- Kingdom: Animalia
- Phylum: Arthropoda
- Clade: Pancrustacea
- Class: Insecta
- Order: Diptera
- Family: Culicidae
- Genus: Aedes
- Subgenus: Stegomyia
- Species: A. katherinensis

Binomial name
- Aedes katherinensis Woodhill, 1949

Synonyms
- Aedes scutellaris katherinensis

Species of mosquito

Aedes (Stegomyia) katherinensis is a species of mosquito in the genus Aedes. It is named for its type locality, being Katherine, Northern Territory, Australia. It is collected occasionally in container surveys in tropical Australia but is never a dominant species.

It is found in the Northern Territory and the Kimberley region of Western Australia.

== Description ==
The head of A. katherinensis is black, aside from two lateral white bands. It has a dark proboscis that is a little over the length of the forefemur, being 2.08 mm long. In larvae, antennae are brown, but in adults they are black.

The thorax is black to dark brown with white bands or patches of white scales. The scutum is covered by narrow dark brown scales, except for three bare areas, and rarely a specimen may have an indistinct line of yellowish scales on each side of the posterior bare area. Wing veins are covered by both broad and elongated dark scales, and at the base of the costa is a patch of white scales.

Its abdomen is roughly 2.78 mm in length, of flat black scales with white bands and some patches of white scales. The first of the seven tergites has long fine hairs, while the rest have a row of short hairs on their posterior margins.

On the coxa of the legs are white scales and strong bristles, and the rest of the legs are black with white bands present on the fore, mid and hind femur, and the hind tarsi. The tibiae are fully black, with no white whatsoever.

== Biology ==
A. katherinensis has been found breeding in tree holes and boab tree depressions. Females are known to bite humans, mainly at dusk, and rarely in great numbers. It has been experimentally shown to be a poor vector of Dengue fever, after it was infected with the PR-159 strain of dengue-2 by intrathoracic inoculation, a method where the virus is injected directly into the thorax, skipping past the midgut.

Male A. katherinensis and female A. scutellaris are able to hybridise and produce fertile offspring, although a cross the between a female A. katherinensis and a male A. scutellaris is sterile. This species can also hybridise with other species within the scutellaris complex.

== Taxonomy ==
A. katherinensis was first described by Anthony Reeve Woodhill as a subspecies of A. scutellaris. Prior to 1944, no A. scutellaris subspecies were described in Australia. In December of 1944 and January of 1945 Australian entomologist and parasitologist Ronald Harry Wharton collected 3 females and 1 male from Batchelor, a town in the Northern Territory. They were sent to entomologist Alan Stone, who differentiated them from A. s. scutellaris through the presence of a white line of scales on the anterior surface of the mid femur, which is not present on the other subspecies.

In 1948, A. E. Wynn forwarded some eggs that were collected in Katherine, which once developed proved to be similar to the previous specimens. They were kept as a lab culture for a year, 700 specimens being examined. It was found that they all had the white marking on their mid femora. Aside from the marking, they were considered identical to A. s. scutellaris "in all other respects, including the eggs, larvae and pupae".

Due to their crossbreeding capabilities and morphological similarities, A. katherinensis was described as a subspecies.
