= Aedes malayensis =

Scientific classification
- Kingdom: Animalia
- Phylum: Arthropoda
- Class: Insecta
- Order: Diptera
- Family: Culicidae
- Genus: Aedes
- Subgenus: Stegomyia
- Species: A. malayensis

Binomial name
- Aedes malayensis Colless, 1963

Species of mosquito

Aedes malayensis was first described in 1963 by Australian entomologist Donald Henry Colless as a subspecies of Aedes scutellaris from males collected at Pulau Hantu, Keppel Harbor, Singapore. In 1972 the subspecies was elevated to species status by Yiau-Min Huang, although the move was disputed by the original describer on biological as opposed to morphological principles.

== Bionomics ==
The immature stages of Aedes malayensis are found mainly in tree holes, bamboo stumps, coconut shells and artificial containers. The species' distribution includes Cambodia, India, Malaysia, Singapore, Taiwan, Thailand, and Vietnam.

== Medical Importance ==
Although no direct role as a vector of disease has been definitively elucidated for Aedes malayensis, the females are known to bite humans and dengue virus has been transovarially transmitted experimentally in the species.
