= Aedes mediovittatus =

Scientific classification
- Kingdom: Animalia
- Phylum: Arthropoda
- Class: Insecta
- Order: Diptera
- Family: Culicidae
- Genus: Aedes
- Subgenus: Gymnometopa; Coquillett, 1906
- Species: A. mediovittatus

Binomial name
- Aedes mediovittatus (Coquillett, 1906)

Species of mosquito

Aedes mediovittatus, the "Caribbean treehole mosquito," was first described in 1906 as Stegomyia mediovittata by Daniel W. Coquillett.

== Bionomics ==
Aedes mediovittatus is found throughout the Greater Antilles in the Caribbean where it often shares larval habitats with Aedes aegypti, the primary vector of the dengue virus, in urban, suburban, and rural areas.

== Medical importance ==
Aedes mediovittatus is a competent vector of Dengue virus, exhibiting high rates of vertical transmission in laboratory studies. It has been observed to feed mostly on humans and dogs but also on chickens, cats, rats, pigs, goats, sheep, cows, and horses. Their broad feeding behavior may somewhat limit their vectorial capacity, but they appear to have a sufficiently high rate of vector-to-human contact to facilitate virus maintenance and transmission in rural areas of Puerto Rico.

Vector control measures that specifically target Aedes aegypti have not always successfully controlled Dengue virus transmission in Puerto Rico, suggesting that even if the primary vector is eliminated, dengue virus transmission can continue when other vector-competent mosquito species like Aedes mediovittatus are present.
