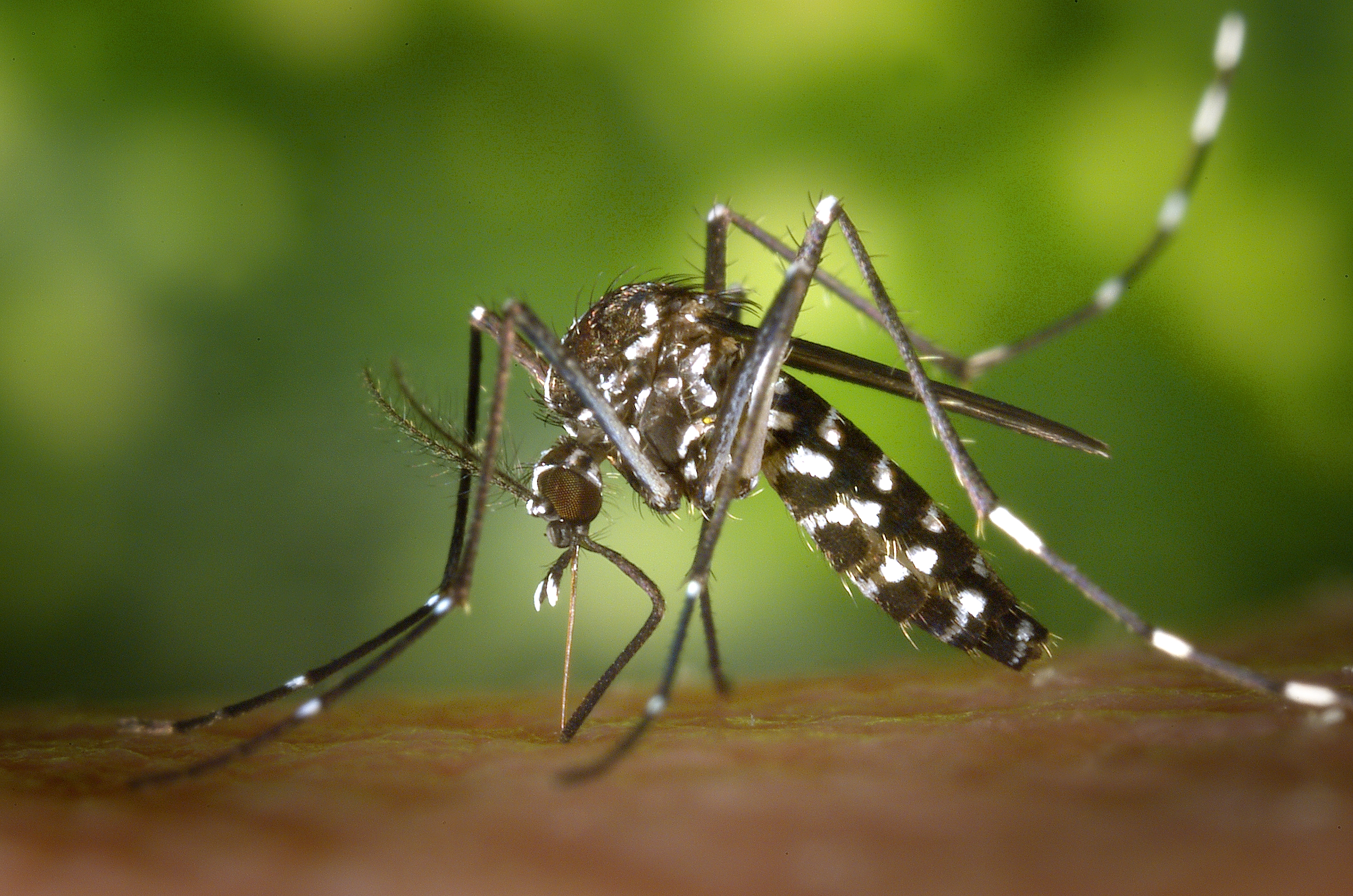

Scientific classification
- Kingdom: Animalia
- Phylum: Arthropoda
- Clade: Pancrustacea
- Class: Insecta
- Order: Diptera
- Family: Culicidae
- Genus: Aedes
- Subgenus: Stegomyia
- Species: A. albopictus

Binomial name
- Aedes albopictus (Skuse, 1894)
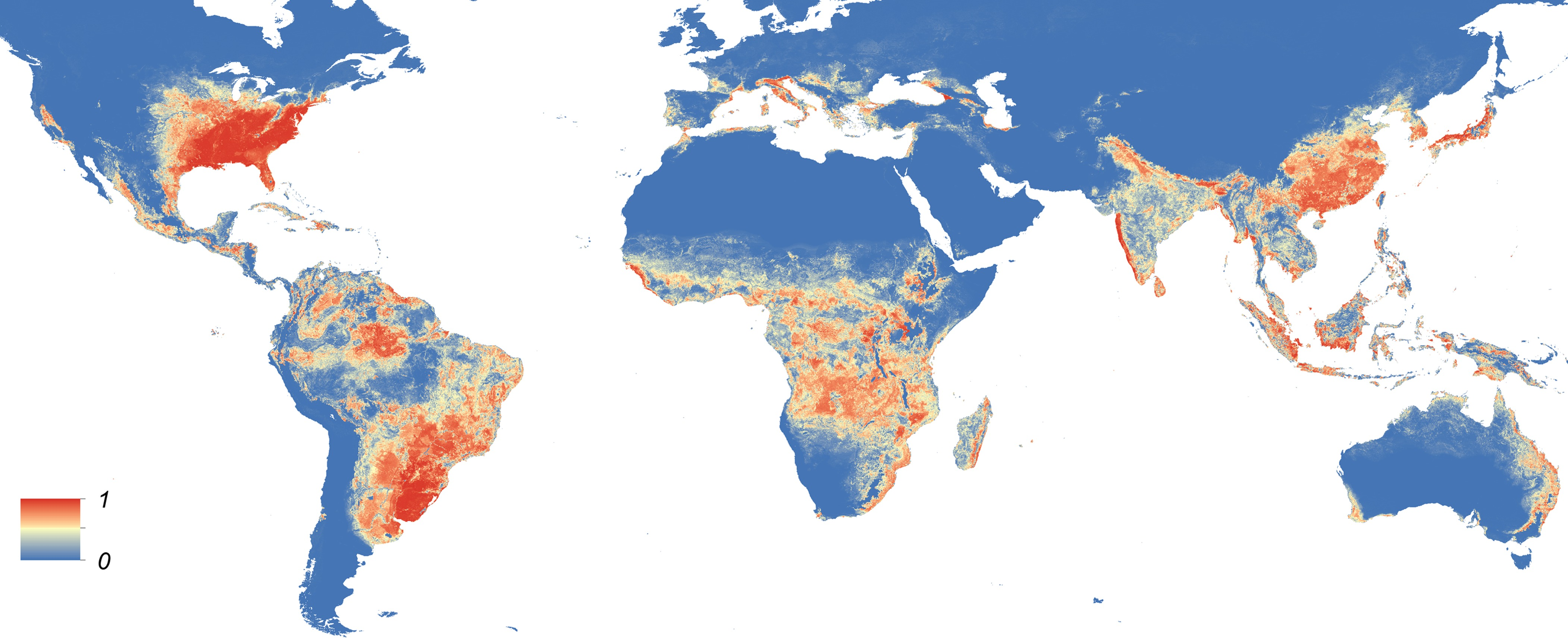

Synonyms
- Culex albopictus Skuse, 1894; Stegomyia albopicta (Skuse, 1894); Stegomyia nigritia Ludlow, 1910; Stegomyia quasinigritia Ludlow, 1911; Stegomyia samarensis Ludlow, 1903

= Aedes albopictus =

Species of mosquito

Aedes albopictus (synonym Stegomyia albopicta), from the mosquito (Culicidae) family, also known as the (Asian) tiger mosquito or forest mosquito, is a species of mosquito found in the tropical and subtropical areas of the world.

In the past few centuries, its distribution has expanded along with the expansion of international trade. This mosquito has become a significant pest in many communities because it closely associates with humans and typically flies and feeds in the daytime in addition to at dusk and dawn.

It is often referred to as a “tiger mosquito” because it has white bands on its legs and body, as does a tiger. It is an epidemiologically important disease vector for the transmission of many viral pathogens, including the yellow fever virus, dengue fever, and Chikungunya fever, as well as several filarial nematodes such as Dirofilaria immitis. Aedes albopictus is capable of hosting the Zika virus and is considered a potential vector for Zika transmission among humans.

== Description ==
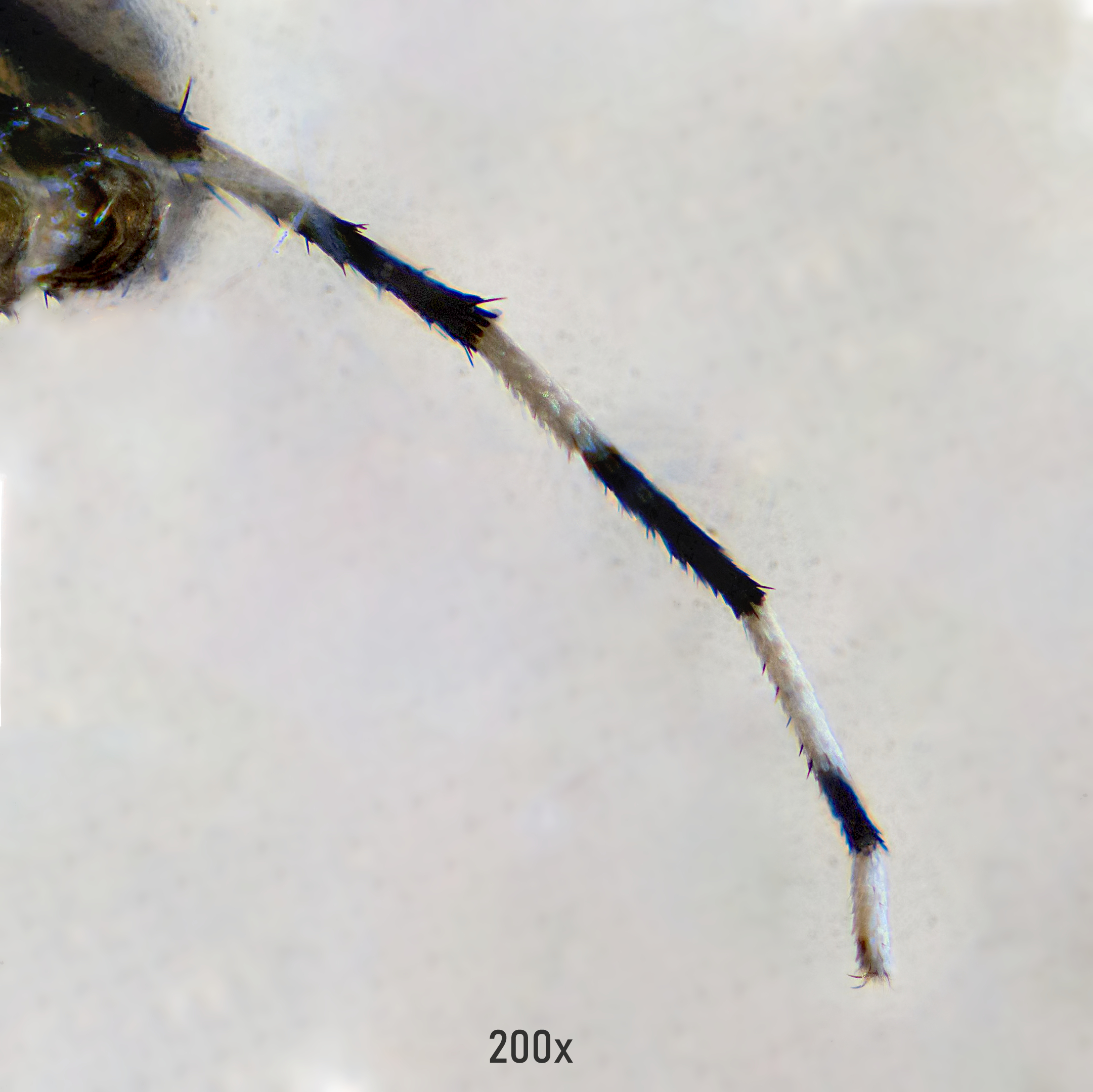
Tiger mosquito leg at 200x magnification

=== Name and systematics ===
In 1894, a British-Australian entomologist, Frederick A. Askew Skuse, was the first to scientifically describe the Asian tiger mosquito, which he named Culex albopictus (lat. culex "gnat", "midge" and albopictus "white-painted"). Later, the species was assigned to the genus Aedes (gr. άηδής, "unpleasant") and referred to as Aedes albopictus. Like the yellow fever mosquito, it belongs to the subgenus Stegomyia (Gr. στέγος, "covered, roofed", referring to the scales that completely cover the dorsal surface in this subgenus, and μυία, "fly") within the genus Aedes. In 2004, scientists explored higher-level relationships and proposed a new classification within the genus Aedes and Stegomyia was elevated to the genus level, making Aedes albopictus now Stegomyia albopicta. This is, however, a controversial matter, and the use of Stegomyia albopicta versus Aedes albopictus is continually debated.

=== Characteristics ===
The adult Asian tiger mosquito is less than 10 mm (0.39 in) long from end to end with a striking white and black pattern. The variation of the body size in adult mosquitoes depends on the density of the larval population and food supply within the breeding water. Since these circumstances are seldom optimal, the average body size of adult mosquitoes is considerably smaller than 10 mm. For example, the average length of the abdomen was calculated to be 2.63 mm (0.104 in), the wings 2.7 mm (0.11 in), and the proboscis 1.88 mm (0.074 in).

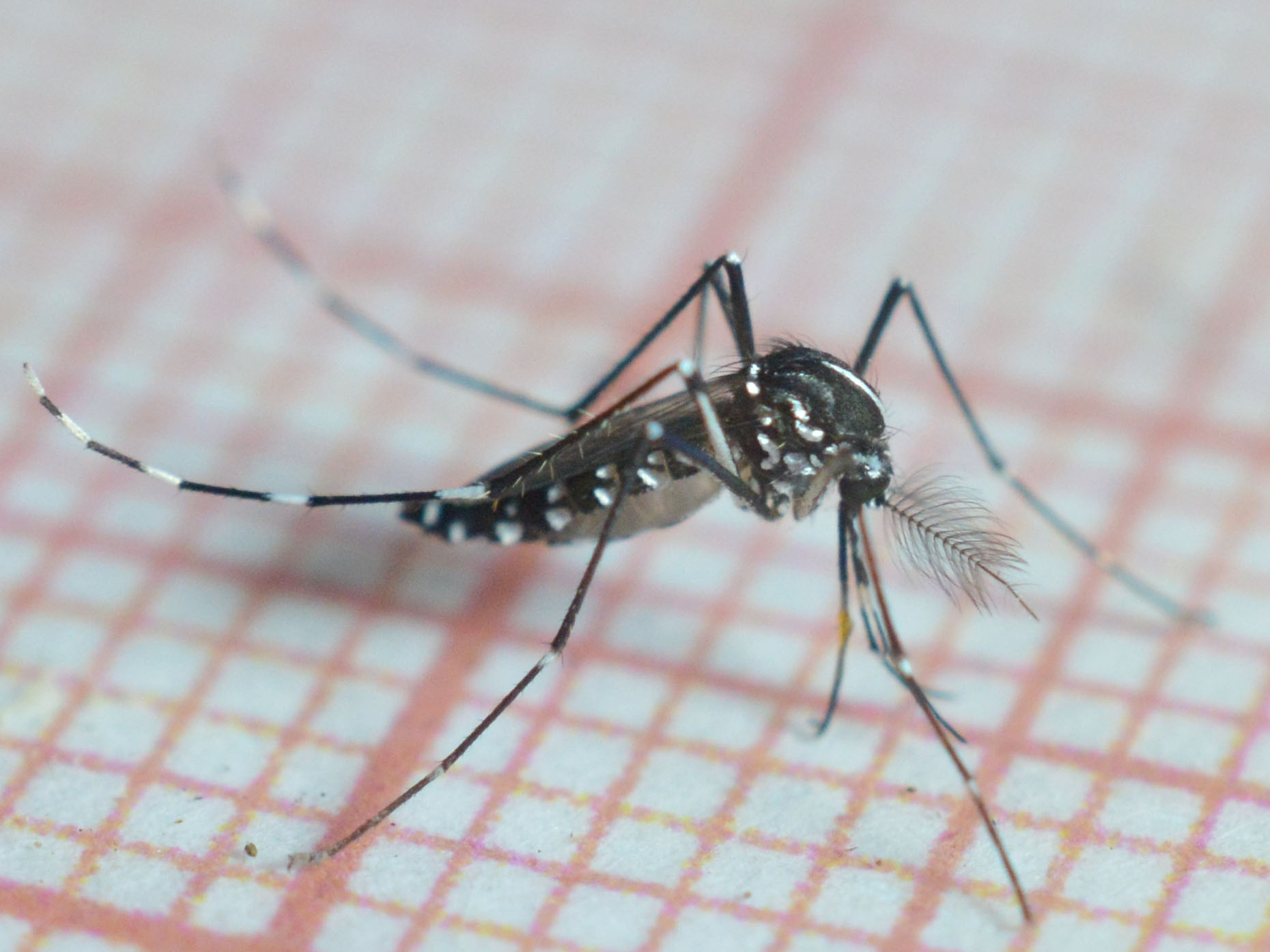
Male

The males are roughly 20% smaller than the females, but they are morphologically very similar. However, as in all mosquito species, the antennae of the males in comparison to the females are noticeably bushier and contain auditory receptors to detect the characteristic whine, almost inaudible to humans, of the female. The maxillary palps of the males are also longer than their proboscis, whereas the females' maxillary palps are much shorter. (This is typical for the males of the Culicinae.) In addition, the tarsus of the hind legs of the males is more silvery. Tarsomere IV is roughly 75% silver in the males whereas the females' is only about 60% silver.

The other characteristics do not differentiate between sexes. A single silvery-white line of tight scales begins between the eyes and continues down the dorsal side of the thorax. This characteristic marking is the easiest and surest way to identify the Asian tiger mosquito.

The proboscis is dark colored, the upper surface of the end segment of the palps is covered in silvery scales, and the labium does not feature a light line on its underside. The compound eyes are distinctly separated from one another. The scute, the dorsal portion of an insect's thoracic segment, is black alongside the characteristic white midline. On the side of the thorax, the scutellum, and the abdomen are numerous spots covered in white-silvery scales.

Such white-silvery scales can also be found on the tarsus, particularly on the hind legs that are commonly suspended in the air. The bases of tarsomeres I through IV have a ring of white scales, creating the appearance of white and black rings. On the forelegs and middle legs, only the first three tarsomeres have the ring of white scales, whereas tarsomere V on the hind legs is completely white. The femur of each leg is also black with white scales on the end of the "knee". The femora of the middle legs do not feature a silver line on the base of the upper side, whereas, the femora on the hind legs have short white lines on base of the upper side. The tibiae are black on the base and have no white scales.

The terga on segments II through VI of the abdomen are dark and have an almost triangular silvery-white marking on the base that is not aligned with the silvery bands of scales on the ventral side of the abdomen. The triangular marking and the silvery band are only aligned on abdominal segment VII. The transparent wings have white spots on the base of the costae. With older mosquito specimens, the scales could be partially worn off, making these characteristics not stand out as much.

As with other members of the mosquito family, the female is equipped with an elongated proboscis that she uses to collect blood to feed her eggs. The Asian tiger mosquito has a rapid bite and an agility that allows it to escape most attempts by people to swat it. By contrast, the male member of the species primarily feeds on nectar and does not bite.

The female lays her eggs near water, not directly into it as other mosquitoes do, but typically near a stagnant pool. However, any open container containing water will suffice for larvae development, even with less than 30 ml (1 US fl oz) of water. It can also breed in running water, so stagnant pools of water are not its only breeding sites. It is more likely to lay eggs in water sources near flowers than in water sources without flowers. It has a short flight range (less than 200 m [220 yd]), so breeding sites are likely to be close to where this mosquito is found.

Other mosquito species may be visually confused with the tiger mosquito. Comparison with approved pictures is the best way to determine the species with certainty. Behavioral cues like almost-silent flight and difficulty in catching combined with knowledge of the range of local endemic mosquitoes may also aid this process.

=== Similar species ===
Some mosquitoes in North America, such as Ochlerotatus canadensis, have a similar leg pattern. In North and South America, Ae. albopictus can be distinguished from Aedes taeniorhynchus since only Ae. albopictus has back markings.

In Europe, the mosquito Culiseta annulata, which is very common, but does not occur in high densities, can be mistaken for an Asian tiger mosquito because of its black-and-white-ringed legs. However, this species is missing the distinctive white line that runs from the middle of its head and down the thorax. It is also considerably larger than Ae. albopictus, is not black and white, but rather beige and grey striped, and has wings with noticeable veins and four dark, indistinct spots. The tree hole mosquito or Aedes geniculatus – a native to Europe and North Africa – has also been mistaken for Ae. albopictus. This is because the tree hole mosquito has very white scales on a very similar body.

In the eastern Mediterranean area, Ae. albopictus species can be mistaken for Aedes cretinus, which also belongs to the subgenus Stegomyia and uses similar breeding waters. Aedes cretinus also has a white stripe on the scute, but it ends shortly before the abdomen, and also has two additional stripes to the left and right of the middle stripe. So far Aedes cretinus is only located in Cyprus, Greece, North Macedonia, Georgia and Turkey.

In Asia, the Asian tiger mosquito can be mistaken for other members of the subgenus Stegomyia, particularly the yellow fever mosquito Aedes aegypti (the most prevalent species in the tropics and subtropics), because both species display a similar black and white pattern. It can be hard to distinguish Ae. albopictus from the closely related Aedes scutellaris (India, Indonesia, Papua New Guinea, and the Philippines), Aedes pseudoalbopictus (India, Indonesia, Malaysia, Myanmar, Nepal, Taiwan, Thailand, and Vietnam) and Aedes seatoi (Thailand).

=== Diet and host location ===
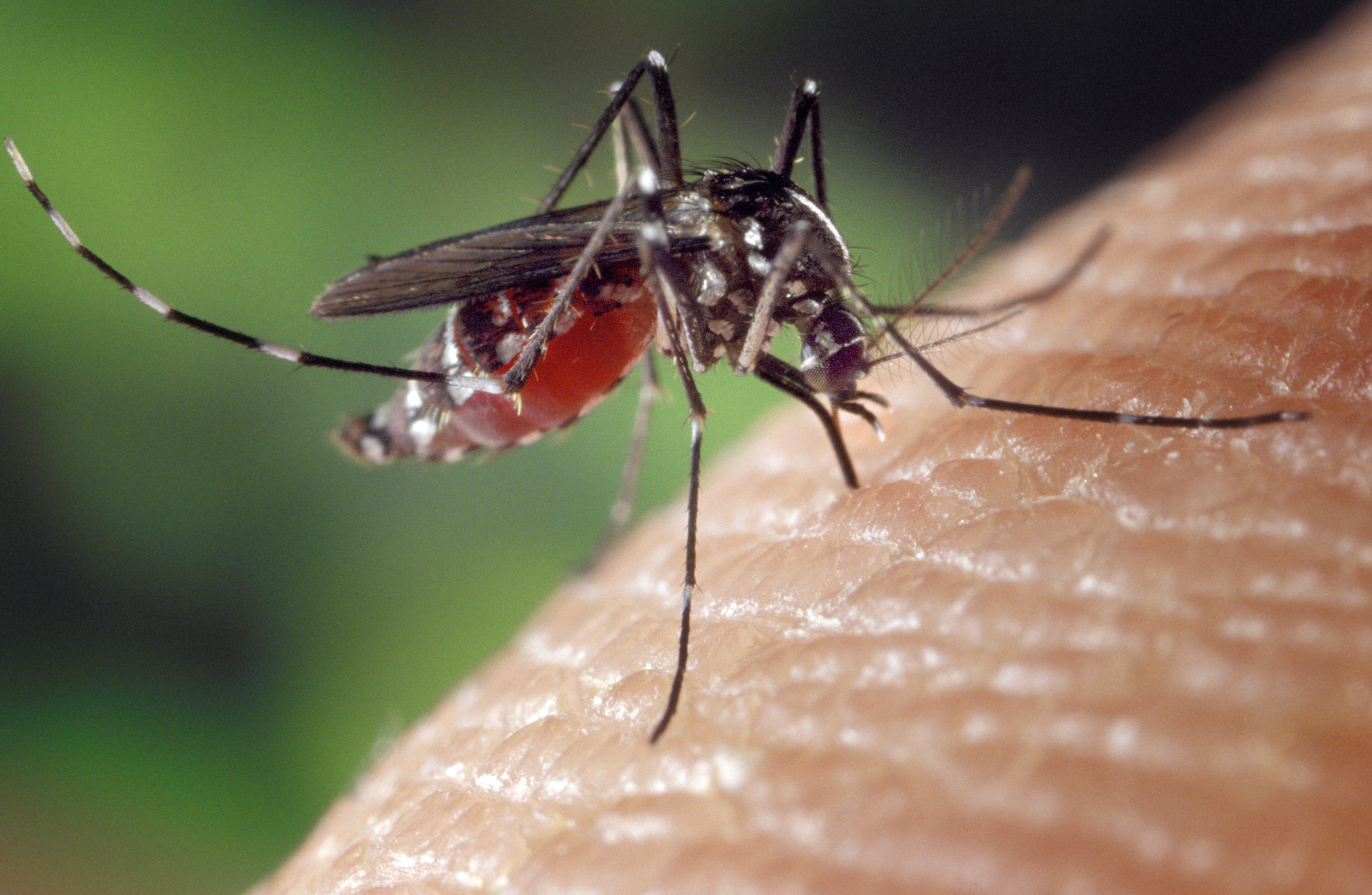
Bloated female at the end of a meal

Like other mosquito species, only the females require a blood meal to develop their eggs. Apart from that, they feed on nectar and other sweet plant juices just as the males do. In regards to host location, carbon dioxide and organic substances produced from the host, humidity, and optical recognition play important roles.

The search for a host takes place in two phases. First, the mosquito exhibits a nonspecific searching behavior until it perceives host stimulants, whereupon it secondly takes a targeted approach. For catching tiger mosquitoes with special traps, carbon dioxide and a combination of chemicals that naturally occur in human skin (fatty acids, ammonia, and lactic acid) are the most attractive.

The Asian tiger mosquito particularly bites in forests during the day, so has been known as the forest day mosquito. Depending upon region and biotype, activity peaks differ, but for the most part, they rest during the morning and night hours. They search for their hosts inside and outside human dwellings, but are particularly active outside. The size of the blood meal depends upon the size of the mosquito, but it is usually around 2 μl (6.8×10^{−5} US fl oz). Their bites are not necessarily painful, but they are more noticeable than those from other kinds of mosquitoes. Tiger mosquitoes generally tend to bite a human host more than once if they are able to.

Ae. albopictus also bites other mammals besides humans, as well as birds. The females are always on the search for a host and are persistent but cautious when it comes to their blood meal and host location. Their blood meal is often broken off before enough blood has been ingested for the development of their eggs, so Asian tiger mosquitoes bite multiple hosts during their development cycle of the egg, making them particularly efficient at transmitting diseases. The mannerism of biting diverse host species enables the Asian tiger mosquito to be a potential bridge vector for certain pathogens that can jump species boundaries, for example the West Nile virus.

=== Natural enemies ===
Primarily, other mosquito larvae, flatworms, swimming beetles, fungi, ciliates, paramecia, protozoans which act as parasites, predatory copepods, and spiders are natural enemies of the larval stage of Asian tiger mosquitoes.

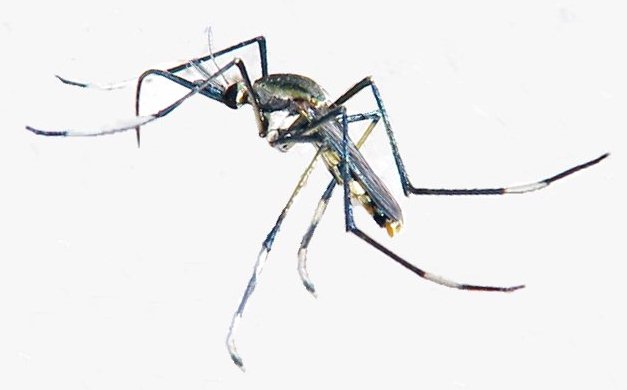
Toxorhynchites speciosus larvae (an adult is shown here) feed on the larvae of Aedes albopictus.

Toxorhynchites larvae, a mosquito genus that does not suck blood, feeds upon other mosquito larvae and are often found with tiger mosquito larvae. Flatworms and small swimming beetles are considered natural predators.

Fungi from the genus Coelomomyces (order Blastocladiales) develop inside the visceral cavity of mosquito larvae. The species Coelomomyces stegomyiae was first found on the Asian tiger mosquito.

Paramecia, or ciliates, can also affect Ae. albopictus larvae, and the first detected species was Lambornella stegomyiae (Hymenostomatida: Tetrahymenidae). The virulence, mortality rate, and subsequent possibilities of Lambornella being implemented as a biological remedy to control Ae. albopictus, however, has conflicting views.

Sporozoans of the genus Ascogregarina (Lecudinidae) infect the larval stage of mosquitoes. The species Ascogregarina taiwanensis was found in Asian tiger mosquitoes. When the adult mosquitoes emerge from their pupal case, they leave the infectious intermediary stage of parasites in the water and close off the infection cycle. Infected adults are generally smaller than non-infected adults and have an insignificantly higher mortality rate; therefore, food supply and larval density apparently play a role. In competitive situations, an infection with sporozoans can also reduce the biological fitness of other uninfected mosquitoes. However, the use of the parasites as an effective biological remedy to control mosquito populations is implausible because the host must reach the adult stage for the transmission of the parasites.

Though they do not commonly occur in the natural habitats of Asian tiger mosquitoes, predatory copepods from the family Cyclopidae seem to willingly feed on them given the opportunity. Relatives of different genera could therefore present a possibility in the control of tiger mosquitoes.

Predators of adult Ae. albopictus in Malaysia include various spider species. Up to 90% of the gathered spiders from rubber plantations and a cemetery fed upon Asian tiger mosquitoes. Whether the spiders would have an effect on the mosquito population is still unclear. Tiger mosquitoes were abundantly present despite the existence of the spiders.

== Distribution ==
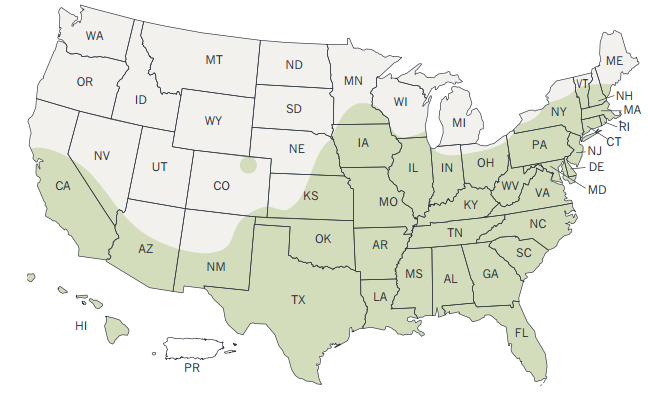
Estimated distribution of Ae. albopictus in the United States, CDC 2016

=== Climatic adaptations ===
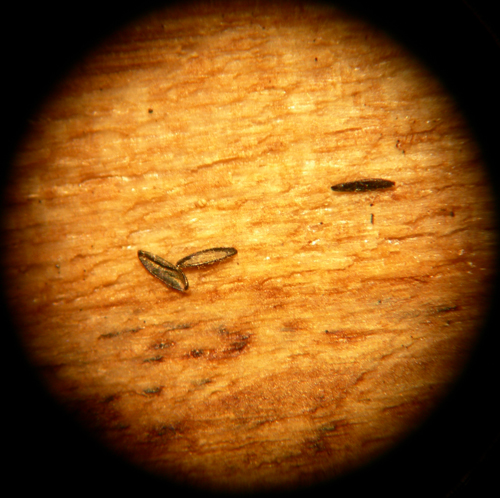
Ae. albopictus eggs

The Asian tiger mosquito originally came from Southeast Asia. In 1966, parts of Asia and India and the Pacific Ocean were denoted as the area of circulation for the Asian tiger mosquito. Ae. albopictus as a native to tropical and subtropical regions with warm and humid climate, is active all year long; however, it has been adapting successfully to cooler, temperate regions, where they hibernate over winter. Eggs from strains in the temperate zones are more tolerant to the cold than ones from warmer regions. The species can even tolerate snow and temperatures under freezing. Adult tiger mosquitoes can survive throughout winter in suitable microhabitats.

=== Invasive species ===
Since the mid-1960s, the tiger mosquito has spread to Europe, the Americas, the Caribbean, Africa, Iceland, and the Middle East. As of 2008 Ae. albopictus was one of the 100 world's worst invasive species according to the Global Invasive Species Database.

As of 2006, Ae. albopictus was not native to Australia and New Zealand. The species was introduced there multiple times, but has yet to establish itself. This is due to the well-organized entomological surveillance programs in the harbors and airports of these countries. Nevertheless, as of 2006 it has become domestic on the islands in the Torres Strait between Queensland, Australia, and New Guinea.

In Europe, Asian tiger mosquitos first emerged in Albania in 1979, introduced through a shipment of goods from China. In 1990–1991, they were most likely brought to Italy in used tires from Georgia (U.S.), and since then have spread throughout the entire mainland of Italy, as well as parts of Sicily and Sardinia. Since 1999, they have established themselves on the mainland of France, primarily southern France. In 2002, they were also discovered in a vacation town on the island of Corsica, but did not completely establish themselves there until 2005. In Belgium, they were detected in 2000 and 2013, in 2001 in Montenegro, 2003 in Canton Ticino in southern Switzerland, and Greece, 2004 in Spain and Croatia, 2005 in the Netherlands and Slovenia, 2006 in Bosnia and Herzegovina and 2022 in Cyprus. In the fall of 2007, the first tiger mosquito eggs were discovered in Rastatt (Baden-Wuerttemberg, Germany). Shortly before, they were found in the northern Alps of Switzerland in Canton Aargau. Since 2010, it has also been sighted increasingly in Malta during summer. In September 2016, Public Health England found eggs, though no mosquitos, in a lorry park at Folkestone service station on the M20, near Westenhanger, which is 6 miles West of the Eurotunnel. The Swiss Autobahns are especially of concern. Governments and universities in Switzerland cooperate every year to monitor the invasion using traps at Autobahn rest stations, and also at airports and commercial hubs. In Slovakia, two independent observations events have been observed in recent years: first in 2012 near Košice and the second in 2023 in the populated Ružinov borough of Bratislava. The species had failed to settle during the first occurrence but had likely settled in the latter, increasing the risk of concern for public health and safety.

In the United States, this species invaded the Southern United States in the 1980s and rapidly spread northward into novel climate compared to its native range. It was initially found in 1983 in Memphis, Tennessee. then at the Port of Houston in a 1985 shipment of used tires, and spread across the South up the East Coast to become prevalent in the Northeast. It was not discovered in Southern California until 2001, then eradicated for over a decade; however, by 2011, it was again being found in Los Angeles County traps, then over the next two years expanded its range to Kern County and San Diego County. As of 2013, North American land favoring the environmental conditions of the Asian tiger mosquito was expected to more than triple in size in the coming 20 years, especially in urban areas. As of 2017 Aedes albopictus mosquitoes have been identified in 1,368 counties in 40 U.S. states. A 2019 study in Nature Microbiology that modeled expansion of Aedes albopictus due to climate change, urbanization, and human movement found that the species would likely continue to spread throughout the coming decades.

In Latin America, the Asian tiger mosquito was first discovered 1986 in Brazil and in 1988 in Argentina and Mexico, as well. Other parts of Latin America where the Asian tiger mosquito was discovered are the Dominican Republic in 1993, Bolivia, Cuba, Honduras, and Guatemala in 1995, El Salvador in 1996, Paraguay in 1999, Panama in 2002, and Uruguay and Nicaragua in 2003.

In Africa, the species was first detected in 1990 in South Africa. In Nigeria, it has been domestic since at least 1991. It spread to Cameroon in 1999/2000, to the Bioko Island of Equatorial Guinea in 2001, and to Gabon in 2006.

In the Middle East, the species was detected in Lebanon in 2003 and in Syria in 2005; the first record in Israel was published in 2003.

=== Competition with established species ===
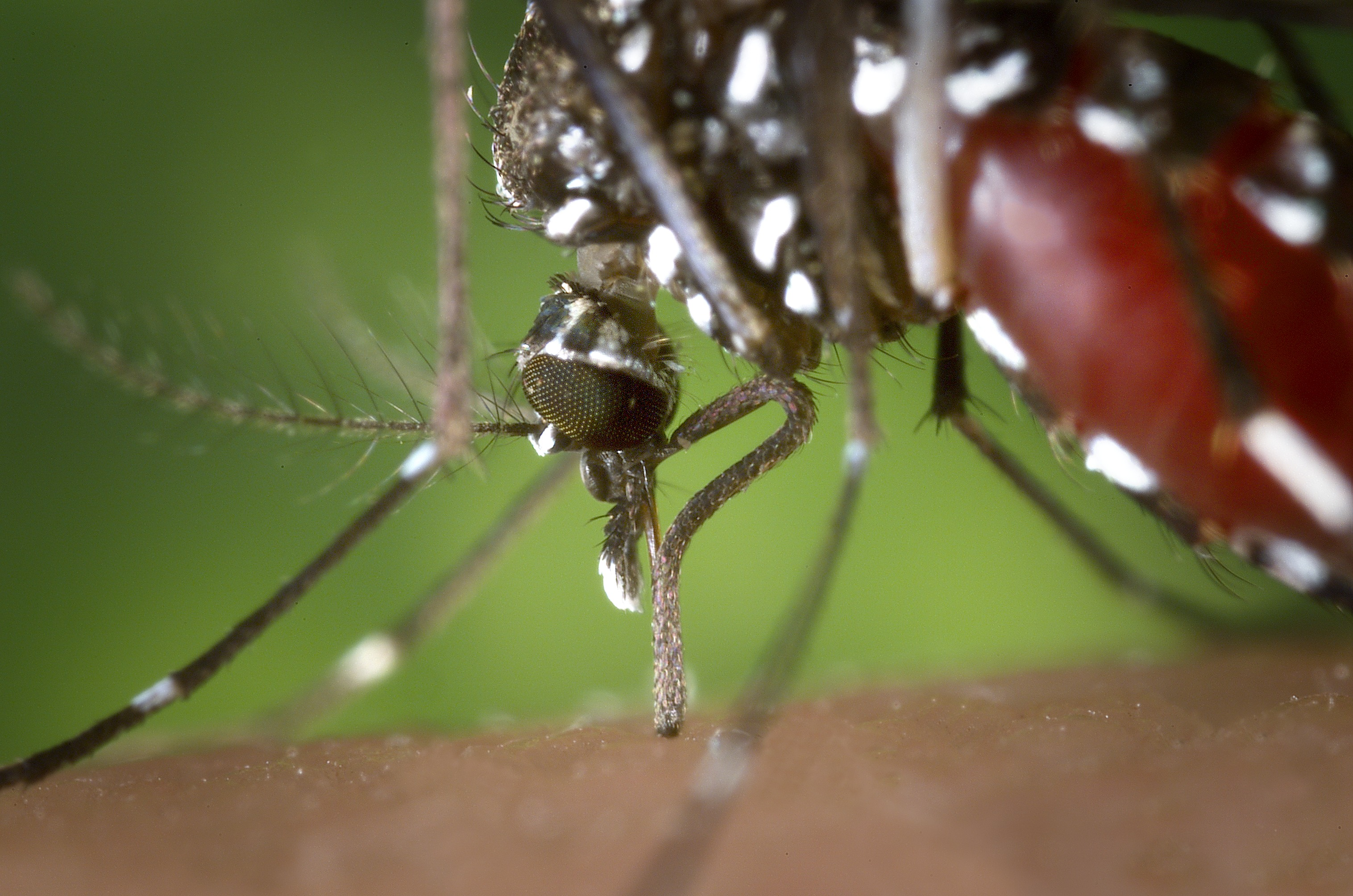
Ae. albopictus

Ae. albopictus can outcompete and even eradicate other species with similar breeding habitats from the very start of its dispersal to other regions and biotopes. In Kolkata, for example, it was observed in the 1960s that egg depositing containers were being settled by the Asian tiger mosquito in city districts where the malaria mosquito (genus Anopheles) and yellow fever mosquito (Aedes aegypti) had both been eliminated by the application of DDT. This may be because primarily the inner walls of the houses were treated with DDT to kill the mosquitoes resting there and fight the malaria mosquito. The yellow fever mosquito also lingers particularly in the inside of buildings and would have been also affected. The Asian tiger mosquito rests in the vicinity of human dwellings would therefore have an advantage over the other two species. In other cases where the yellow fever mosquito was repressed by the Asian tiger mosquito, for instance in Florida, this explanation does not fit. Other hypotheses include competition in the larval breeding waters, differences in metabolism and reproductive biology, or a major susceptibility to sporozoans (Apicomplexa).

Another species which was suppressed by the migrating Ae. albopictus was Ae. guamensis in Guam.

The Asian tiger mosquito is similar, in terms of its close socialization with humans, to the common house mosquito (Culex pipiens). Among other differences in their biology, Culex pipiens prefers larger breeding waters and is more tolerant to cold. In this respect, no significant competition or suppression between the two species likely occurs.

A possible competition among mosquito species that all lay their eggs in knotholes and other similar places (Ae. cretinus, Ae. geniculatus, and Anopheles plumbeus) has yet to be observed.

In Europe, the Asian tiger mosquito apparently covers an extensive new niche. This means that no native, long-established species conflict with the dispersal of Ae. albopictus.

== Role as disease vector ==
=== For humans ===
Ae. albopictus is known to transmit pathogens and viruses, such as the yellow fever, dengue fever, Chikungunya fever, and Usutu virus. There is some evidence supporting the role of Ae. albopictus in the transmission of Zika virus, which is primarily transmitted by the related Ae. aegypti.

The Asian tiger mosquito was responsible for the Chikungunya epidemic on the French Island La Réunion in 2005–2006. By September 2006, an estimated 266,000 people were infected with the virus, and 248 fatalities occurred on the island. The Asian tiger mosquito was also the transmitter of the virus in the first outbreak of Chikungunya fever on the European continent. This outbreak occurred in the Italian province of Ravenna in the summer of 2007, and infected over 200 people. Evidently, mutated strains of the Chikungunya virus are being directly transmitted through Ae. albopictus particularly well and in such a way that another dispersal of the disease in regions with the Asian tiger mosquito is feared.

On the basis of experimental evidence and probability estimates, the likelihood of mechanical or biological transmission of HIV by insects is virtually nonexistent.

=== For animals ===
The tiger mosquito is relevant to veterinary medicine. For example, tiger mosquitoes are transmitters of Dirofilaria immitis, a parasitic roundworm that causes heart failure in dogs and cats.

=== For arthropods ===
Wolbachia infection are the most common infection in arthropods today, and over 40% of arthropods have contracted it. Wolbachia can be transmitted from parent to offspring or between breeding individuals. Wolbachia is easily transmitted within the Ae. albopictus mosquito due to the effects it has on fecundity in females. Once female Asian tiger mosquitos have contracted the infection, they produce more eggs, give birth more frequently, and live longer than uninfected females. In this way, Wolbachia provides a fitness advantage to the infected females and prevents uninfected females from reproducing. This allows control of the spread of diseases that many species carry by suppressing reproduction of the individuals with the harmful disease, but without the Wolbachia infection. Wolbachia can also be used to transfer certain genes into the population to further control the spread of diseases.

==== Cytoplasmic incompatibility ====
In the natural environment, Wolbachia and the Asian tiger mosquito are in a symbiotic relationship, so both species benefit from each other and can evolve together. The relationship between Wolbachia and its host might not have always been mutualistic, as Drosophila populations once experienced decreased fecundity in infected females, suggesting that Wolbachia evolved over time so that infected individuals would actually reproduce much more. The mechanism by which Wolbachia is inherited through maternal heredity is called cytoplasmic incompatibility. This changes the gamete cells of males and females, making some individuals unable to mate with each other. Although little is known about why cytoplasmic incompatibility exists, Wolbachia infection creates a fitness advantage for infected females, as they can mate with either infected or uninfected males. Despite this, infected males cannot reproduce with uninfected females. Therefore, over time, a population exposed to Wolbachia transitions from a few infected individuals to all individuals becoming infected, as the males that cannot reproduce successfully do not contribute to future generations. This is called population replacement, where the population's overall genotype is replaced by a new genotype. This shows how populations of Asian tiger mosquitoes can vary in number of Wolbachia-infected individuals, based on how often the infection is transmitted. Due to Wolbachia's ability to transmit from one host to the next, it can change the average genotype of a population, potentially reducing the population's gene flow with other nearby populations.

==== Unidirectional cytoplasmic incompatibility ====
This type of cytoplasmic incompatibility where an infected male cannot reproduce successfully with an uninfected female is called unidirectional cytoplasmic incompatibility. It occurs because Wolbachia modifies the paternal chromosomes during sperm development, leading to complications for these offspring during embryonic development.

==== Bidirectional cytoplasmic incompatibility ====
Also, bidirectional cytoplasmic incompatibility occurs when an infected male carrying one strain of Wolbachia reproduces with an infected female carrying a different strain of Wolbachia. This also results in failed reproduction. Bidirectional cytoplasmic incompatibility also has evolutionary implications for populations of Ae. albopictus and other vectors of the infection. This is because bidirectional cytoplasmic incompatibility in Wolbachia creates unviable offspring, reducing gene flow between two populations, which can eventually lead to speciation.

== Control and suppression ==
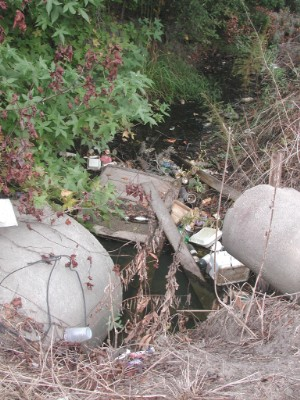
Litter in roadside ditches makes an ideal breeding ground for the Asian tiger mosquito.

Ae. albopictus is very difficult to suppress or to control due to its remarkable ability to adapt to various environments, its close contact with humans, and its reproductive biology.

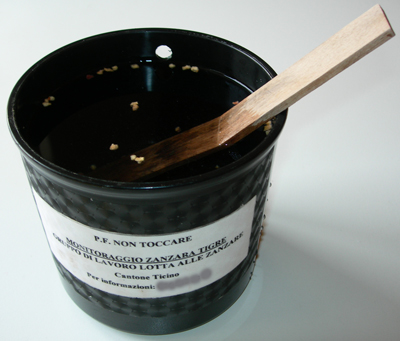
An Ovitrap, a tool for the detection of Asian tiger mosquitoes: Their presence is confirmed through the eggs they lay on the wooden paddle. The brown granules in the water are a Bti preparation that kills hatching mosquito larvae.

The containment of infestations is generally effected by public health services through area-wide integrated control plans, which aim to reduce the nuisance perceived by populations and the risks of viraemic transmission. Such plans consist of different activities that include entomological surveillance, larvicide treatments in public and private areas, information campaigns, and treatments against adult mosquitoes in the zones affected by suspected cases of transmissible viruses.

Efficient monitoring or surveillance is essential to prevent the spread and establishment of this species. In addition to the monitoring of ports, warehouses with imported plants, and stockpiles of tires, rest areas on highways and train stations should be monitored with appropriate methods.

=== Stagnant water removal ===
The control of Asian tiger mosquitoes begins with destroying the places where they lay their eggs, which are never far from where people are being bitten, since they are weak fliers, with only about a 180-metre (590 ft) lifetime flying radius. Puddles that last more than three days, sagging or plugged roof gutters, old tires holding water, litter, and any other possible containers or pools of standing water should be drained or removed. Bird baths, inlets to sewers and drainage systems holding stagnant water, flower pots, standing flower vases, knotholes, and other crevices that can collect water should be filled with sand or fine gravel to prevent mosquitoes from laying their eggs in them.

Any standing water in pools, catchment basins, etc., that cannot be drained, or dumped, can be periodically treated with properly labeled insecticides or Bacillus thuringiensis israelensis (Bti), often formed into doughnut-shaped "mosquito dunks". Bti produces toxins which are effective in killing larvae of mosquitoes and certain other dipterans, while having almost no effect on other organisms. Bti preparations are readily available at farm, garden, and pool suppliers.

Flowing water will not be a breeding spot, and water that contains minnows is not usually a problem, because the fish eat the mosquito larvae.

=== Dragonflies ===
Adult and nymphal dragonflies have been proposed as biological control of mosquito species. Dragonfly nymphs eat mosquito larvae, at least in laboratory conditions, though studies of wild dragonfly diets have not shown mosquitoes to be part of dragonfly nymph diets. A study of adult dragonfly diets in Europe showed that adult mosquitoes were not an important food source.

=== Ovitraps ===
In any case, an efficient surveillance is essential to monitor the presence of tiger mosquitoes and the effect of control programs. Ovitraps are normally used for the monitoring of Ae. albopictus. They are black water containers with floating Styrofoam blocks or small wooden paddles that are in contact with the surface of the water. Female tiger mosquitoes lay their eggs on these surfaces. Through the identification of these eggs or of the larvae that hatch from these eggs in the laboratory, the presence and abundance of mosquito species can be estimated. Versions of these traps with an adhesive film (sticky traps) that catch the egg-depositing mosquitoes make the analysis much easier and quicker, but are more complicated in terms of handling. The results of ovitraps are often variable and depend on the availability of alternative egg-depositing waters. Due to this, it is best to use them in large numbers and in conjunction with other monitoring methods.

To date, few effective traps for adult Asian tiger mosquitoes are available. Those traps that catch other species of mosquitoes do not catch tiger mosquitoes efficiently. A form of an ovitrap called a lethal ovitrap mimics the breeding site for Ae. albopictus just like the monitoring tool, but it has the added benefit of containing chemicals that are toxic to the mosquitoes when they enter, but do not harm humans. These traps have had success in some countries to control Aedes mosquito populations. A new trap type has now been shown to catch significant numbers of Ae. albopictus. This device, with the help of a ventilator, produces an upward air current of ammonia, fatty acids, and lactic acids that takes a similar form and smell of a human body. With the addition of carbon dioxide, the efficacy of the trap is increased. This means a suitable tool is available for trapping adult tiger mosquitoes, and for example, examining the existence of viruses in the trapped mosquitoes. Previously, the mosquitoes had to be collected from volunteers to be studied, which is ethically questionable, especially during epidemics. Recent research also indicates this trap type may also have a use as a control tool; in a study in Cesena, Italy, the number of biting tiger mosquitoes was reduced in places where traps were installed.

An amino acid substitution mutation – F1534C – is overwhelmingly the most common voltage-gated sodium channel in A. albopictus in Singapore. This channel being the target of pyrethroids, this is suspected to be a knockdown resistance (kdr) mutation, and that that is the reason for its prevalence.

== Public health benefits ==
Although the Wolbachia infection is prevalent in arthropod species, especially the Asian tiger mosquito, it is a useful mechanism for inhibiting the spread of dengue. Ae. aegypti individuals, a close relative of Ae. albopictus, with an artificial Wolbachia infection, cannot transmit dengue, an infectious virus, but they can pass on the Wolbachia infection to other populations. This could lead to many more discoveries in disease control for Ae. albopictus and other mosquito species. In addition, due to the cytoplasmic incompatibility caused by Wolbachia, the artificial infection of males can serve as a biological control as they are unable to reproduce successfully with uninfected females (unidirectional CI). When artificially infected males are unable to reproduce, the population size can be controlled, thereby reducing the transmission of the harmful disease of interest. Artificial infection of males is achieved by the removal of cytoplasm from infected oocytes, which is then transferred into embryos prior to the blastoderm stage.
