= Aedes hensilli =

Scientific classification
- Kingdom: Animalia
- Phylum: Arthropoda
- Class: Insecta
- Order: Diptera
- Family: Culicidae
- Genus: Aedes
- Subgenus: Stegomyia
- Species: A. hensilli

Binomial name
- Aedes hensilli Farner, 1945

Species of mosquito

Aedes hensilli is a mosquito species originally collected in 1945 on Ulithi atoll in the Caroline Islands of the western Pacific Ocean, about 191 km (103 nautical mi) east of Yap State. It is the most abundant and widespread Aedes (Stegomyia) species mosquito in Yap State, the only Aedes (Stegomyia) species on Woleai, and the only species of mosquito present on Eauripik.

The specific epithet recognizes the collector of the type specimens, Dr. George S. Hensill.

== Ecology ==
Larvae of Ae. hensilli develop in empty coconut shells, tree holes, and bamboo, and in artificial containers such as tin cans, discarded drums, barrels, bottles, tires, tarps, and floats; larvae were not found in leaf axils of pandanus trees or in taro plants. Water barrels used to collect rainwater are major contributors to mosquito production due to the high number of larvae and pupae hosted in them.

The adults are active primarily at dusk.

== Medical importance ==
Aedes hensilli is a potential vector of dengue virus and Zika virus and laboratory studies have indicated that it could play a role in transmitting other medically important arbovirus and chikungunya viruses
