= NS1 antigen test =

Test for dengue fever

- Crystal structure of the dengue virus, which causes dengue fever
- ICD-10-PCS: A90
- LOINC: 75377-2

NS1 antigen test (nonstructural protein 1) is a test for dengue, introduced in 2006. It allows rapid detection on the first day of fever, before antibodies appear some 5 or more days later. It has been adopted for use in some 40 nations. The method of detection is through enzyme-linked immunosorbent assay. India has introduced in 2010 the NS1 test costing 1,600 rupees at a private hospital in Mumbai.

== Medical use ==
Dengue testing

The medical use of the NS1 antigen test can be defined to diagnose dengue infections and is effective to 1st day detection. Additionally, NS1 assay is useful for differential diagnostics in regards to flaviviruses.

NS1 is present in the serum of infected persons directly at the onset of clinical symptoms in primary dengue infection and produces a strong humoral response. It is detectable before the appearance of IgM antibodies.

DENV by NS1 antigen is laboratory confirmation of dengue in people also assessing clinical aspects (as well as, taking into account where the individual may have traveled recently). Serological tests such as an immunoglobulin M antibody capture–enzyme-linked immunosorbent assay (MAC-ELISA) and viral RNA detection by reverse transcriptase (RT-PCR) can also be used to diagnose dengue fever.

== See also ==
- Dengue virus
- Dengue fever
