= Aedes luteocephalus =

Scientific classification
- Kingdom: Animalia
- Phylum: Arthropoda
- Class: Insecta
- Order: Diptera
- Family: Culicidae
- Genus: Aedes
- Subgenus: Stegomyia
- Species: A. luteocephalus

Binomial name
- Aedes luteocephalus Newstead, 1907

Species of mosquito

Aedes luteocephalus is an African species that is a demonstrated or suspected vector of several important arboviral diseases of humans. First described in 1907 as Stegomyia luteocephala, the species is currently classified in the genus Aedes, subgenus Stegomyia.

== Bionomics ==
The immature stages of Aedes luteocephalus develop preferentially in tree holes and rot holes, with bamboo stems and artificial containers also being utilized for egg-laying and larval and pupal development.

The species' distribution includes Angola, Benin, Burkina Faso, Cameroon, Central African Republic, Democratic Republic of the Congo (formerly Zaire), Ethiopia, Ghana, Guinea, Ivory Coast, Nigeria, Senegal, Sierra Leone, Sudan, Tanzania, Zambia, and Zimbabwe.

== Medical importance ==
Adult female Aedes luteocephalus are human-biters and demonstrated vectors of yellow fever. Chikungunya, dengue serotype 2, and Zika viruses have also been isolated from Aedes luteocephalus.
