= Aedes africanus =

Scientific classification
- Kingdom: Animalia
- Phylum: Arthropoda
- Clade: Pancrustacea
- Class: Insecta
- Order: Diptera
- Family: Culicidae
- Genus: Aedes
- Subgenus: Stegomyia
- Species: A. africanus

Binomial name
- Aedes africanus (Theobald, 1901)

Synonyms
- Stegomyia africanus

Species of mosquito

Aedes africanus is a species of mosquito that is found on the continent of Africa with the exclusion of Madagascar. Aedes aegypti and Aedes africanus are the two main yellow fever vector species in Zambia. Aedes africanus is mainly found in tropical forests not near wetlands.

== Identification ==
This mosquito has distinct white and black stripes along its body which help differentiate the genus from others in this family. Females of this species are ectoparasites and can most often be found on mammals living in the tropical forests of Africa. The africanus species can be distinguished from other mosquitoes in the genus Aedes by having white scales on the maxillary palpi, scutum with a patch of large white scales, and 3 large white patches on the mid-femur.

== Life cycle ==
The lifecycle of mosquitoes in the Aedes genus.

This species lays its eggs in holes in trees, cut bamboo, bamboo stumps, and tree forks. In laboratory settings, it was observed that the larvae hatch best at 27 °C and the quantity of water was not a factor in embryonic development but was most often laid within 2 cm of the water surface.

Aedes africanus adults are crepuscular feeders, meaning they feed from dusk to dawn. Although this species is a vector for many diseases, because it is mainly found in forests, primates are its main source of blood meals. Early studies of its populations suggest that when sampled in forested areas, it made up 95% of the caught species and only 50% in surrounding villages. When populations are high enough, Toxorhynchites mosquitoes can be brought in as a biological control as they parasitize africanus larvae in the shared breeding habitat.

== Medical importance ==
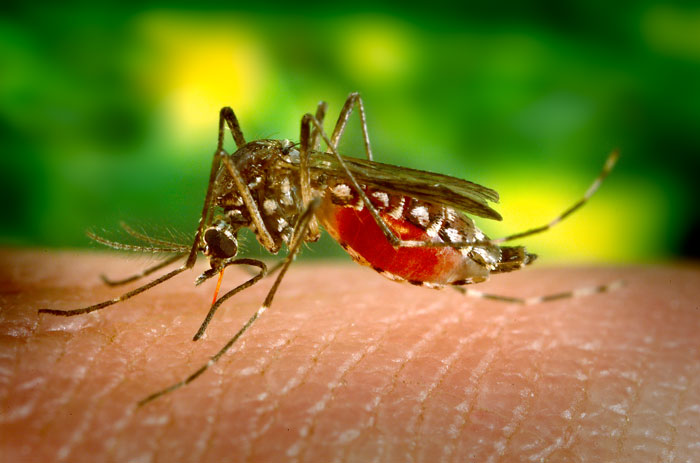
Very closely related to Aedes africanus, this Aedes aegypti mosquito is also a very important vector of the yellow fever virus.

This species of mosquito is an essential yellow fever vector in wooded habitats. In addition to being a major vector of yellow fever, Aedes africanus also vectors pathogens such as dengue virus, West Nile virus, and Rift Valley fever virus. It is also a vector of Zika virus, the causal agent of Zika fever.
