= Aedes mediopunctatus =

Scientific classification
- Kingdom: Animalia
- Phylum: Arthropoda
- Class: Insecta
- Order: Diptera
- Family: Culicidae
- Genus: Aedes
- Subgenus: Stegomyia
- Species: A. mediopunctatus

Binomial name
- Aedes mediopunctatus (Theobald, 1905)

Synonyms
- Stegomyia submediopunctatus Barraud, 1923

Species of mosquito

Aedes (Stegomyia) mediopunctatus is a species complex of zoophilic mosquito belonging to the genus Aedes. It is endemic to Sri Lanka.
