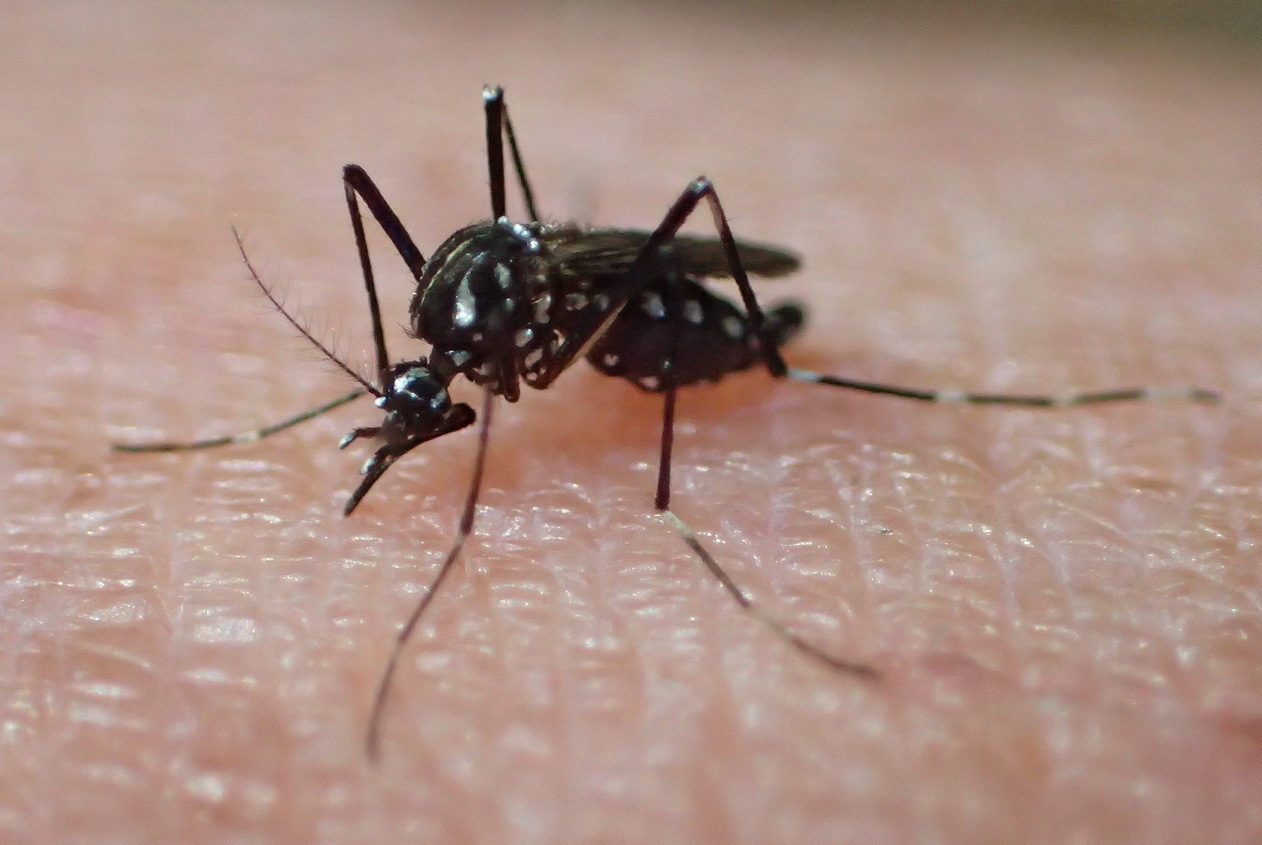

Scientific classification
- Domain: Eukaryota
- Kingdom: Animalia
- Phylum: Arthropoda
- Class: Insecta
- Order: Diptera
- Family: Culicidae
- Genus: Aedes
- Subgenus: Stegomyia
- Species: A. poweri

Binomial name
- Aedes poweri Theobald, 1905

= Aedes poweri =

Species of mosquito

Aedes poweri is a mosquito of the genus Aedes first described by Theobald in 1905.

== Distribution ==
This species has been reported in southern Zimbabwe, as the provinces KwaZulu-Natal, Eastern Cape, Western Cape, and Northern Cape of South Africa.

== Description ==
Aedes poweri can be difficult distinguish from Aedes hogsbackensis, which also inhabits the same region.
