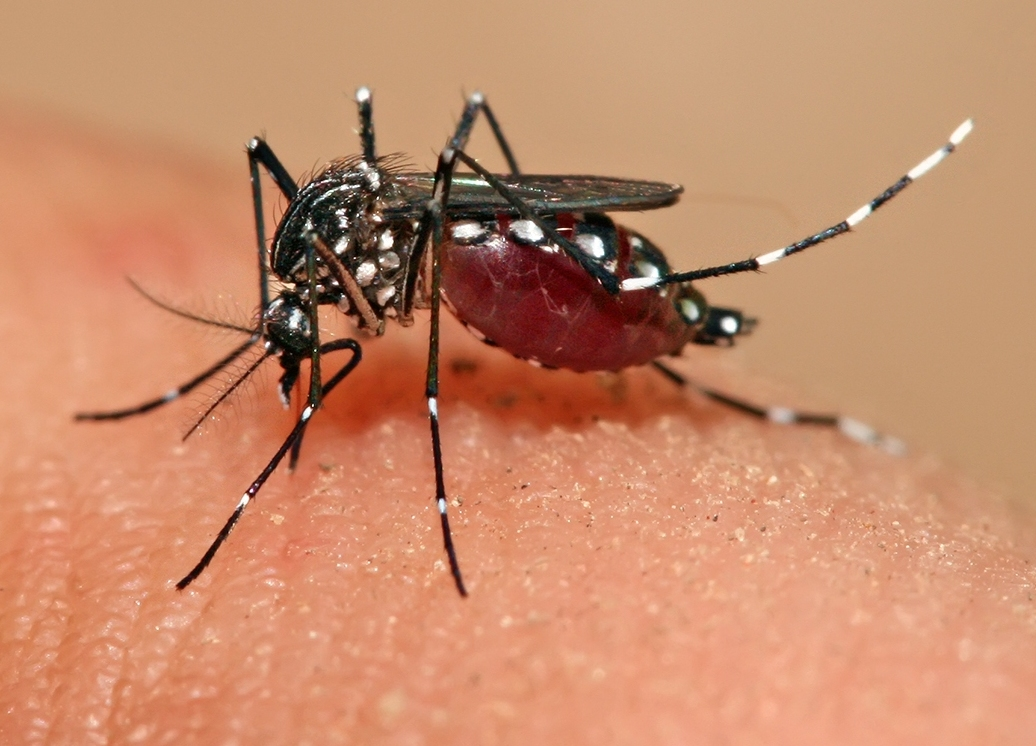
- Aedes aegypti

Scientific classification
- Kingdom: Animalia
- Phylum: Arthropoda
- Clade: Pancrustacea
- Class: Insecta
- Order: Diptera
- Family: Culicidae
- Genus: Aedes
- Subgenus: Stegomyia; Theobald, 1901

Type species
- Aedes aegypti (Linnaeus, 1762)

= Stegomyia =

Subgenus of mosquitoes

Stegomyia is a large subgenus of the mosquito genus Aedes with 131 species classified in six species groups (group uncertain for one species), two groups of which are further divided into subgroups.

== Bionomics and disease relations ==
The immature stages of species of subgenus Stegomyia are found in natural and artificial containers. Typical habitats are tree holes, but many species inhabit small amounts of water contained in dead and fallen plant parts. A few species utilise rock holes, crab holes and the leaf axils of various plants. Eggs are normally resistant to desiccation and hatch when the habitat is filled with water. Females are typically diurnal and many species (approximately 50) are known to bite humans. They also feed on a variety of domestic and wild animals, including mammals, birds, reptiles and amphibians.

Subgenus Stegomyia is a medically important group. Ae. aegypti is the classical vector of yellow fever and dengue fever viruses and a proven vector of other viruses. Ae. albopictus is also an important vector of dengue fever virus. Other recognised vectors of yellow fever virus include Ae. africanus and Ae. luteocephalus in areas of central and western Africa and Ae. bromeliae in East Africa. Some species of the Scutellaris Group are efficient vectors of Wuchereria bancrofti in the South Pacific. Various arbo viruses have been isolated from other species of the subgenus.

== Distribution ==
Species of subgenus Stegomyia have distributions in the Afrotropical, Australasian and Oriental Regions. Two species, Ae. aegypti and Ae. albopictus, have been transported to areas of the Nearctic, Neotropical and Palaearctic Regions by human agency.

== Species ==
The subgenus Stegomyia contains 128 species

- Aedes aegypti (Linnaeus, 1762) - yellow fever mosquito
- Aedes africanus (Theobald, 1901) - yellow fever mosquito
- Aedes agrihanensis Bohart, 1957
- Aedes albopictus Skuse, 1895 - forest day mosquito, Asian tiger mosquito, tiger mosquito
- Aedes alcasidi Huang, 1972
- Aedes alorensis Bonne-Wepster and Brug, 1932
- Aedes amaltheus De Meillon and Lavoipierre, 1944
- Aedes andrewsi Edwards, 1926
- Aedes angustus Edwards, 1935
- Aedes annandalei (Theobald, 1910)
- Aedes aobae Belkin, 1962
- Aedes apicoargenteus (Theobald, 1909)
- Aedes bambusae Edwards, 1935
- Aedes blacklocki Evans, 1925
- Aedes bromeliae (Theobald, 1911)
- Aedes burnsi Basio and Reisen, 1971
- Aedes calceatus Edwards, 1924
- Aedes chaussieri Edwards, 1923
- Aedes chemulpoensis Yamada, 1921
- Aedes contiguus Edwards, 1936
- Aedes cooki Belkin, 1962
- Aedes corneti Huang, 1986
- Aedes craggi ( Barraud, 1923)
- Aedes cretinus Edwards, 1921
- Aedes daitensis Miyagi and Toma, 1981
- Aedes deboeri Edwards, 1926
- Aedes demeilloni Edwards, 1936
- Aedes denderensis Wolfs, 1949
- Aedes dendrophilus Edwards, 1921
- Aedes desmotes (Giles, 1904)
- Aedes dybasi Bohart, 1957
- Aedes ealaensis Huang, 2004
- Aedes edwardsi ( Barraud, 1923)
- Aedes ethiopiensis Huang, 2004
- Aedes flavopictus Yamada, 1921
- Aedes fraseri (Edwards, 1912)
- Aedes futunae Belkin, 1962
- Aedes gallois Yamada, 1921
- Aedes galloisiodes Liu and Lu, 1984
- Aedes gandaensis Huang, 2004
- Aedes gardnerii (Ludlow, 1905)
- Aedes grantii (Theobald, 1901)
- Aedes guamensis Farner and Bohart, 1944
- Aedes gurneyiStone and Bohart, 1944
- Aedes hakanssoni Knight and Hurlbut, 1949
- Aedes hansfordi Huang, 1997
- Aedes hebrideus Edwards, 1926
- Aedes heischi van Someren, 1951
- Aedes hensilli Farner, 1945
- Aedes hogsbackensis Huang, 2004
- Aedes hoguei Belkin, 1962
- Aedes horrescens Edwards, 1935
- Aedes josiahae Huang, 1988
- Aedes katherinensis Woodhill, 1949
- Aedes keniensis van Someren, 1946
- Aedes kenyae van Someren, 1946
- Aedes kesseli Huang and Hitchcock, 1980
- Aedes kivuensis Edwards, 1941
- Aedes krombeini Huang, 1975
- Aedes langata van Someren, 1946
- Aedes ledgeri Huang, 1981
- Aedes lilii (Theobald, 1910)
- Aedes luteocephalus (Newstead,1907)
- Aedes maehleri Bohart, 1957
- Aedes malayensis Colless, 1962
- Aedes malikuli Huang, 1973
- Aedes marshallensis Stone and Bohart, 1944
- Aedes mascarensis MacGregor, 1924
- Aedes masseyi Edwards, 1923
- Aedes matinglyorum Huang, 1994
- Aedes maxgermaini Huang, 1990
- Aedes mediopunctatus (Theobald, 1905)
- Aedes metallicus ( Edwards, 1912)
- Aedes mickevichae Huang, 1988
- Aedes mpusiensis Huang, 2004
- Aedes muroafcete Huang, 1997
- Aedes neoafricanus Cornet, Valade and Dieng, 1978
- Aedes neogalloisi Chen and H B Chen, 2000
- Aedes neopandani Bohart, 1957
- Aedes njombiensis Huang, 1997
- Aedes novalbopictus Barraud, 1931
- Aedes opok Corbet and van Someren, 1962
- Aedes palauensis Bohart, 1957
- Aedes pandani Stone, 1939
- Aedes patriciae Mattingly, 1954
- Aedes paullusi Stone and Farner, 1945
- Aedes pernotatus Farner and Bohart, 1944
- Aedes perplexus (Leicester, 1908)
- Aedes pia (Le Goff and Robert in Le Goff et al, 2013)
- Aedes polynesiensis Marks, 1951
- Aedes poweri (Theobald, 1905)
- Aedes pseudoafricanus Chwatt, 1949
- Aedes pseudalbopictus (Borel, 1928)
- Aedes pseudonigeria (Theobald, 1910)
- Aedes pseudoscutellaris (Theobald, 1910)
- Aedes quasiscutellaris Farner and Bohart, 1944
- Aedes rhungkiangensis P-X Chang and S M Chang, 1974
- Aedes riversi Bohart and Ingram, 1946
- Aedes robinsoni Belkin, 1962
- Aedes rotanus Bohart and Ingram, 1946
- Aedes rotumae Belkin, 1962
- Aedes ruwenzori Haddow and van Someren, 1950
- Aedes saimedres Huang, 1988
- Aedes saipanensisStone, 1945
- Aedes sampi Huang, 2004
- Aedes schwetzi Edwards, 1926
- Aedes scutellaris (Walker, 1859)
- Aedes scutoscriptus Bohart and Ingram, 1946
- Aedes seampi Huang, 1974
- Aedes seatoi Huang, 1969
- Aedes segermanae Huang, 1997
- Aedes sibiricus Danilov and Filippova, 1978
- Aedes simpsoni (Theobald, 1905)
- Aedes soleatus Edwards, 1924
- Aedes strelitziae Muspratt, 1950
- Aedes subalbopictus Barraud, 1931
- Aedes subargenteus Edwards, 1925
- Aedes tabu Ramalingam and Belkin, 1965
- Aedes tongae Edwards, 1926
- Aedes tulagiensis Edwards, 1926
- Aedes unilineatus (Theobald, 1906)
- Aedes upolensis Marks, 1957
- Aedes usambara Mattingly, 1953
- Aedes varuae Belkin, 1962
- Aedes vinsoni Mattingly, 1953
- Aedes w-albus (Theobald, 1905)
- Aedes wadai Tanaka, Mizusawa and Saugstad, 1979
- Aedes woodi Edwards, 1922
