= Aedes apicoargenteus =

Scientific classification
- Kingdom: Animalia
- Phylum: Arthropoda
- Clade: Pancrustacea
- Class: Insecta
- Order: Diptera
- Family: Culicidae
- Genus: Aedes
- Subgenus: Stegomyia
- Species: A. apicoargenteus

Binomial name
- Aedes apicoargenteus Theobald, 1910

Species of mosquito

Aedes apicoargenteus is an African mosquito species, first described as Stegomyia apicoargentea from specimens collected in Ashanti, Ghana.

== Bionomics ==
Adults have been collected along bush-paths in bush habitat near Obuasi and Kumasi, Ghana. Distribution includes Angola, Benin, Burkina Faso, Cameroon, Central African Republic, Congo, Côte d'Ivoire, Democratic Republic of the Congo (Zaire), Gabon, Ghana, Kenya, Liberia, Nigeria, Senegal, Sierra Leone, Sudan and South Sudan, Tanganyika, Togo, and Uganda.

== Medical importance ==
Adult Aedes apicoargenteus are human-biters, and vectors of Zika virus, the causative agent of Zika fever.
