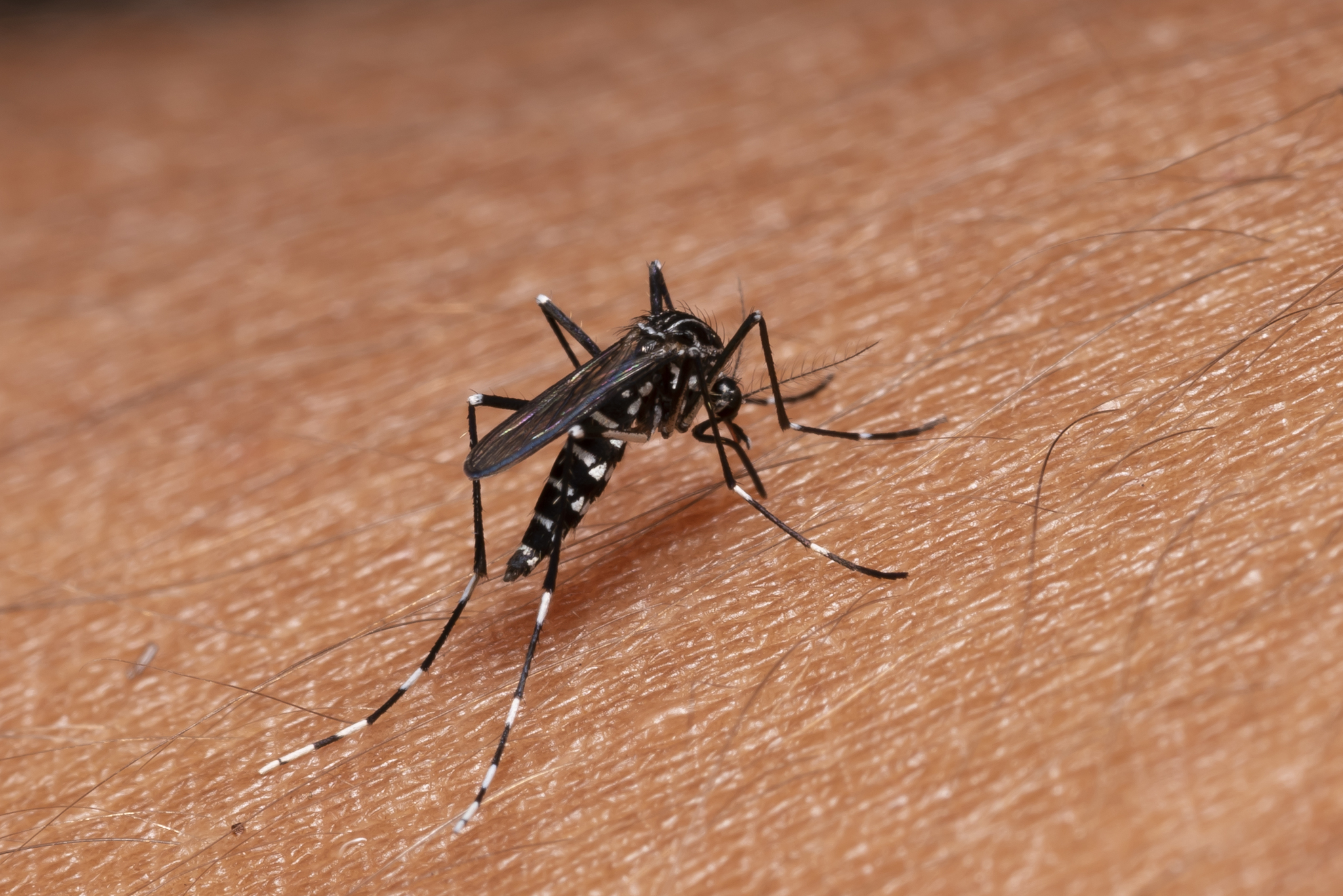

Scientific classification
- Kingdom: Animalia
- Phylum: Arthropoda
- Class: Insecta
- Order: Diptera
- Family: Culicidae
- Genus: Aedes
- Subgenus: Stegomyia
- Species: A. cretinus

Binomial name
- Aedes cretinus Edwards, 1921

= Aedes cretinus =

Species of mosquito

Aedes cretinus is a mosquito species of the Aedes genus, similar in appearance and hence easily confused with Aedes albopictus.

== Description ==
The scutum (back of the thorax) has a thin white midline stripe that forks at the end. There is a small interruption in the white stripe near the "shoulder" area, about 1/3 from the front edge. The overall pattern is similar to other Stegomyia mosquitoes like Aedes albopictus and Aedes aegypti, but has longer white lateral lines on the back that almost reach the middle of the scutum.

The larvae of A. cretinus can be found in various breeding sites, such as tree holes and used tires.

A. cretinus is known to bite humans, but its role as a disease vector is not as well-established as that of other Aedes species like A. albopictus or A. aegypti.

== Distribution ==
This species is primarily found in countries in southeastern Europe such as Greece, North Macedonia, Cyprus, and Turkey. Recent studies indicate that A. cretinus populations have declined significantly in Greece following the invasion of Aedes albopictus. The invasive A. albopictus appears to be outcompeting A. cretinus in many areas where they coexist.
