= Intrathoracic inoculation =

Method of inoculation

Intrathoracic inoculation is a method of inoculation where a virus or other infectious agent is injected directly into the thorax of an insect, often mosquitoes, bypassing the midgut and other barriers to viral infection. This leads to a higher proportion of disseminated infections compared to blood feeding. This technique is used prevalently in Aedes spp., which are known to exhibit midgut infection and midgut escape barriers. The mosquito is therefore infected with a more constant dose of the virus.

== Origin ==
Intrathoracic inoculation was originally described by Duane J. Gubler and Leon Rosen in 1976, as a way to infect and demonstrate transmission of Dengue virus in mosquitoes without the need of a vertebrate host.
