= Aedes geniculatus =

Scientific classification
- Kingdom: Animalia
- Phylum: Arthropoda
- Class: Insecta
- Order: Diptera
- Family: Culicidae
- Genus: Aedes
- Subgenus: Dahliana
- Species: A. geniculatus

Binomial name
- Aedes geniculatus (Olivier, 1791)

Synonyms
- Culex albo-punctatus Rondani, 1872; Culex guttatus Curtis, 1835; Culex guttatus Meigen, 1818; Culex lateralis Meigen, 1818; Culex ornatus Meigen, 1818

Species of mosquito

Aedes geniculatus, also known as the tree hole mosquito, is closely related to the better known Asian tiger mosquito and is native to Europe and North Africa.

After the Zika epidemic in 2016, it was mistakenly reported to Public Health England by members of the public, who were monitoring the spread of Zika-carrying mosquitoes in southern England following media reports of the spread of the Asian tiger mosquito.

Although it has not been observed in the wild as a disease vector, in laboratory tests, the tree hole mosquito can transmit yellow fever and chikungunya and so may be able to spread the Zika virus.
