= Aedes krombeini =

Scientific classification
- Kingdom: Animalia
- Phylum: Arthropoda
- Clade: Pancrustacea
- Class: Insecta
- Order: Diptera
- Family: Culicidae
- Genus: Aedes
- Subgenus: Stegomyia
- Species: A. krombeini

Binomial name
- Aedes krombeini Huang, 1975

Species of mosquito

Aedes (Stegomyia) krombeini is a species complex of zoophilic mosquito belonging to the Scutellaria group of the genus Aedes. It is endemic to Sri Lanka.

== Etymology ==
The specific name is named for Dr. Karl V. Krombein, who was a Senior Entomologist and Principal Investigator of the "Biosystematic Studies of the Insects of Ceylon" project, Smithsonian Institution.

== Description ==
Male has dark scaled proboscis. Scutum with narrow dark scales and a prominent median longitudinal stripe of similar white ones. Mesepimeral scale patches connected forming a V-shaped white scale patch. Coxae with patches of white scales. Halters are with dark scales.
