= Aedes polynesiensis =

Scientific classification
- Domain: Eukaryota
- Kingdom: Animalia
- Phylum: Arthropoda
- Class: Insecta
- Order: Diptera
- Family: Culicidae
- Genus: Aedes
- Subgenus: Stegomyia
- Species: A. polynesiensis

Binomial name
- Aedes polynesiensis Marks, 1951

Species of mosquito

Aedes polynesiensis, the Polynesian tiger mosquito, is only found in the South Pacific on the islands of Austral Islands, Cook Islands, Ellice Islands, Fiji Islands, Hoorn Islands, Marquesas Islands, Pitcairn Island, Samoa Islands, Society Islands, Tokelau Islands, Tuamotu Archipelago. It is a vector of dengue, Ross River virus, and lymphatic filariasis, and a probable vector of Zika virus. Adults lay eggs in natural and human-associated pools of freshwater. Common larval habitats include tree holes, holes in volcanic rock formations, coconut shells, water storage containers (drums), and discarded trash (including tires and bottles).
