= Dengue fever =

Mosquito-borne disease

- Other names: Dengue, breakbone fever
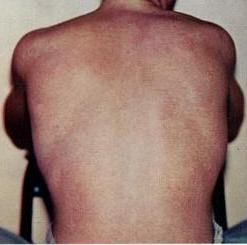
- Typical rash seen in dengue fever
- Pronunciation: /ˈdɛŋɡi, -ɡeɪ/
- Specialty: Infectious disease
- Symptoms: Fever, headache, muscle and joint pain, rash; most cases asymptomatic
- Complications: Bleeding, low levels of blood platelets, dangerously low blood pressure
- Usual onset: 3–14 days after exposure
- Duration: 2–7 days
- Causes: Dengue virus by Aedes mosquitos
- Diagnostic method: Detecting antibodies to the virus or its RNA
- Differential diagnosis: Malaria, yellow fever, viral hepatitis, leptospirosis
- Prevention: Dengue fever vaccine, decreasing mosquito exposure
- Treatment: Supportive care, intravenous fluids, blood transfusions
- Frequency: 5 million per year (2023)
- Deaths: 5,000 per year (2023)

Video summary

Dengue fever is a mosquito-borne disease caused by dengue virus. Most cases result in either no or mild symptoms. Symptoms typically begin 3 to 14 days after infection. They may include a high fever, headache, vomiting, muscle and joint pains, and a characteristic skin itching and skin rash. Recovery generally takes two to seven days. In a small proportion of cases, the disease develops into severe dengue (previously known as dengue hemorrhagic fever or dengue shock syndrome) with bleeding, low levels of blood platelets, blood plasma leakage, and dangerously low blood pressure.

Dengue is spread by several species of female mosquitoes of the Aedes genus, principally Aedes aegypti. The virus has four confirmed serotypes; infection with one type usually gives lifelong immunity to that type, but only short-term immunity to the others. Subsequent infection with a different type increases the risk of severe complications, so-called antibody-dependent enhancement. The symptoms may resemble those of malaria, influenza, or Zika fever. Blood tests to confirm the diagnosis include detecting viral RNA, or specific antibodies.

Infection can be prevented by mosquito elimination and the prevention of mosquito bites. Two types of dengue vaccine have been approved and available. Dengvaxia is only recommended to prevent re-infection in individuals who have been previously infected, while Qdenga is suitable for adults, adolescents and children from four years of age. Treatment is symptomatic, as there is no specific medication. In mild cases, this focuses on managing pain. Severe cases require hospitalisation; and includes giving fluid either by mouth or intravenously.

The earliest descriptions of a dengue outbreak date from 1779; its viral cause and spread were understood by the early 20th century. Already routinely spread in more than one hundred tropical and subtropical regions countries, it is spreading to the Iberian Peninsula and the southern United States, partly attributed to climate change. It is classified as a neglected tropical disease. During 2023, more than 5 million infections were reported, with more than 5,000 dengue-related deaths. As most cases are asymptomatic or mild, the actual numbers of dengue cases and deaths are under-reported.

== Signs and symptoms ==
Schematic depiction of the symptoms of dengue

Clinical course of dengue

Typically, people infected with dengue virus have no symptoms or only mild symptoms such as an uncomplicated fever (80%). Others have more severe illness (5%), and in a small proportion it is life-threatening. The incubation period (time between exposure and onset of symptoms) ranges from 3 to 14 days, but most often it is 4 to 7 days.

The characteristic symptoms of mild dengue are sudden-onset fever, headache (typically located behind the eyes), muscle and joint pains, nausea, vomiting, swollen glands and a rash. If this progresses to severe dengue the symptoms are severe abdominal pain, persistent vomiting, rapid breathing, bleeding gums or nose, fatigue, restlessness, blood in vomit or stool, extreme thirst, pale and cold skin, and feelings of weakness.

=== Clinical course ===
The course of infection is divided into three phases: febrile, critical, and recovery.

The febrile phase involves high fever (40–41 °C; 104–105.8 °F), and is associated with generalized pain and a headache; this usually lasts two to seven days. There may also be nausea, vomiting, a rash, and pains in the muscle and joints.

Most people recover within a week or so. In about 5% of cases, symptoms worsen and can become life-threatening. This is called severe dengue (formerly called dengue hemorrhagic fever or dengue shock syndrome). Severe dengue can lead to shock, internal bleeding, organ failure and even death. Warning signs include severe stomach pain, vomiting, difficulty breathing, and blood in the nose, gums, vomit or stools.

During this period, there is leakage of plasma from the blood vessels, together with a reduction in platelets. This may result in fluid accumulation in the chest and abdominal cavity as well as depletion of fluid from the circulation and decreased blood supply to vital organs.

The recovery phase usually lasts two to three days. The improvement is often striking, and can be accompanied with severe itching and a slow heart rate.

=== Severe dengue ===
The World Health Organization's International Classification of Diseases divides dengue fever into two classes: uncomplicated and severe. Severe dengue is defined as that associated clinically with severe plasma leakage, severe bleeding, or severe organ dysfunction.

Severe dengue can develop suddenly, sometimes after a few days as the fever subsides. Leakage of plasma from the capillaries results in extreme low blood pressure and hypovolemic shock; patients with severe plasma leakage may have fluid accumulation in the lungs or abdomen, insufficient protein in the blood, or thickening of the blood. Severe dengue is a medical emergency which can cause damage to organs, leading to multiple organ failure and death.

=== Complications ===
Complications following severe dengue include fatigue, somnolence, headache, concentration impairment and memory impairment. A pregnant woman who develops dengue is at higher risk of miscarriage, low birth weight, and premature birth.

Children and older individuals are at a risk of developing complications from dengue fever compared to other age groups; young children typically suffer from more intense symptoms. Concurrent infections with tropical diseases like the Zika virus can worsen symptoms and make recovery more challenging.

== Cause ==
=== Virology ===
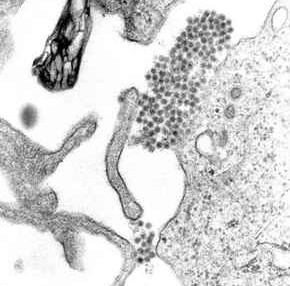
A TEM micrograph showing dengue virus virions (the cluster of dark dots near the center)

Dengue virus (DENV) is an RNA virus of the family Flaviviridae; genus Flavivirus. Other members of the same genus include yellow fever virus, West Nile virus, and Zika virus. Dengue virus genome (genetic material) contains about 11,000 nucleotide bases, which code for the three structural protein molecules (C, prM and E) that form the virus particle and seven other protein molecules that are required for replication of the virus. There are four confirmed strains of the virus, called serotypes, referred to as DENV-1, DENV-2, DENV-3 and DENV-4. The distinctions between the serotypes are based on their antigenicity.

=== Transmission ===
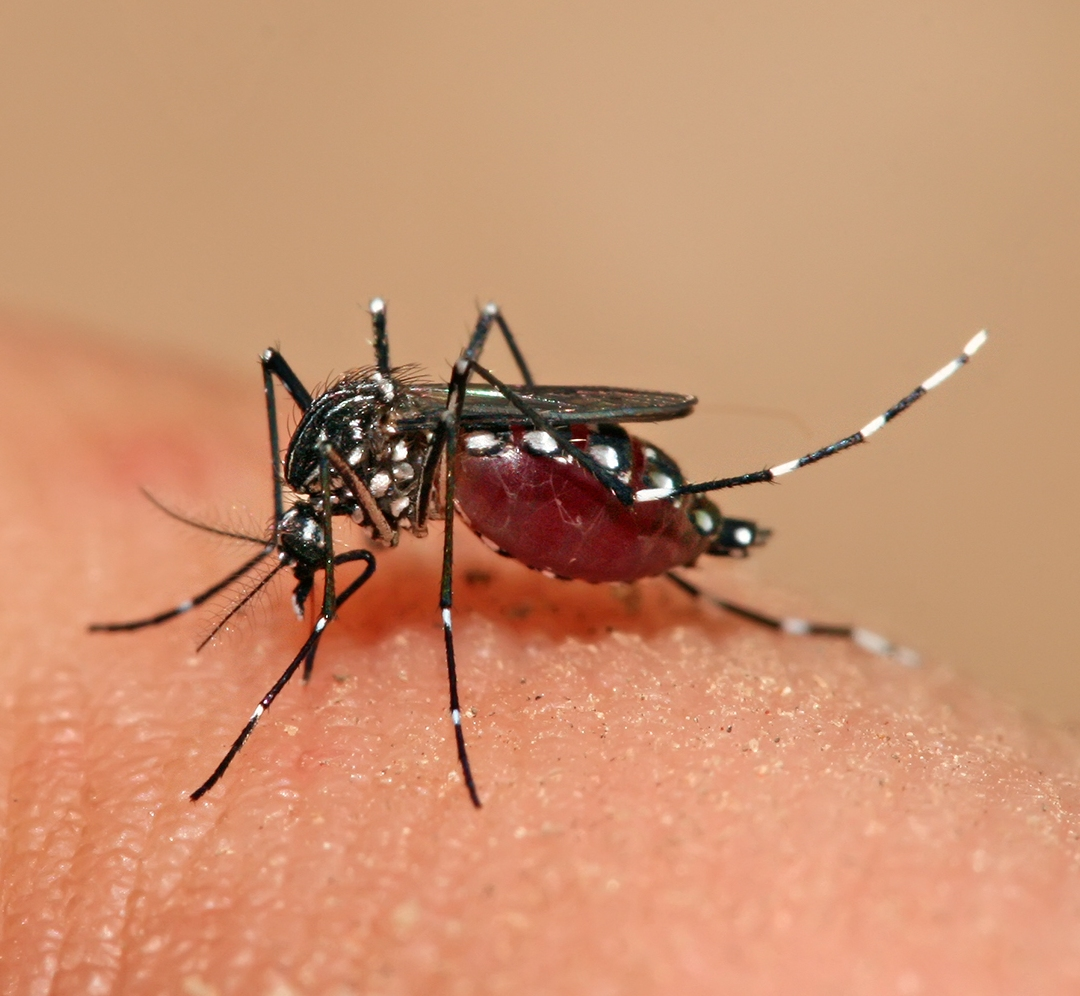
The mosquito Aedes aegypti feeding on a human host

Dengue virus is most frequently transmitted by the bite of mosquitos in the Aedes genus, particularly A. aegypti. They prefer to feed at dusk and dawn, but they may bite and thus spread infection at any time of day. Other Aedes species that may transmit the disease include A. albopictus, A. polynesiensis and A. scutellaris. Humans are the primary host of the virus, but it also circulates in nonhuman primates, and can infect other mammals. An infection can be acquired via a single bite.

For 2 to 10 days after becoming newly infected, a person's bloodstream will contain a high level of virus particles (the viremic period). A female mosquito that takes a blood meal from the infected host then propagates the virus in the cells lining its gut. Over the next few days, the virus spreads to other tissues including the mosquito's salivary glands and is released into its saliva. Next time the mosquito feeds, the infectious saliva will be injected into the bloodstream of its victim, thus spreading the disease. The virus seems to have no detrimental effect on the mosquito, which remains infected for life.

Dengue can also be transmitted via infected blood products and through organ donation. Vertical transmission (from mother to child) during pregnancy or at birth has been reported.

=== Risk factors ===
In antibody-dependent enhancement (ADE), antibodies bind to both viral particles and Fc gamma receptors expressed on immune cells, increasing the likelihood that the viruses will infect those cells.

The principal risk for infection with dengue is the bite of an infected mosquito. This is more probable in areas where the disease is endemic, especially where there is high population density, poor sanitation, and standing water where mosquitoes can breed. It can be mitigated by taking steps to avoid bites such as by wearing clothing that fully covers the skin, using mosquito netting while resting, and/or the application of insect repellent (DEET being the most effective).

Chronic diseases – such as asthma, sickle cell anemia, and diabetes mellitus – increase the risk of developing a severe form of the disease. Other risk factors for severe dengue include female sex, older age (in adults), younger age (in children), and high body mass index.

Infection with one serotype is thought to produce lifelong immunity to that type, but only short-term protection against the other three. Subsequent re-infection with a different serotype increases the risk of severe complications due to a phenomenon known as antibody-dependent enhancement (ADE). The exact mechanism of ADE is not fully understood. It appears that ADE occurs when the antibodies generated during an immune response recognize and bind to a pathogen, but they fail to neutralize it. Instead, the antibody-virus complex has an enhanced ability to bind to the Fcγ receptors of the target immune cells, enabling the virus to infect the cell and reproduce itself.

== Mechanism ==
When a dengue virus carrying mosquito bites a person, the virus enters the skin together with the mosquito's saliva. The virus infects nearby skin cells called keratinocytes, as well as specialized immune cells located in the skin, called Langerhans cells. The Langerhans cells migrate to the lymph nodes, where the infection spreads to white blood cells, and reproduces inside the cells while they move throughout the body.

The white blood cells respond by producing several signaling proteins, such as cytokines and interferons, which are responsible for many of the symptoms, such as the fever, the flu-like symptoms, and the severe pains. In severe infection, the virus production inside the body is greatly increased, and many more organs (such as the liver and the bone marrow) can be affected. Fluid from the bloodstream leaks through the wall of small blood vessels into body cavities due to increased capillary permeability. As a result, blood volume decreases, and the blood pressure becomes so low that it cannot supply sufficient blood to vital organs. The spread of the virus to the bone marrow leads to reduced numbers of platelets, which are necessary for effective blood clotting; this increases the risk of bleeding, the other major complication of dengue fever.

== Diagnosis ==
Graph of when laboratory tests for dengue fever become positive. Day zero refers to the start of symptoms, 1st refers to in those with a primary infection, and 2nd refers to in those with a secondary infection.

Mild cases of dengue fever can easily be confused with several common diseases including Influenza, measles, chikungunya, and zika. Dengue, chikungunya and zika share the same mode of transmission (Aedes mosquitoes) and are often endemic in the same regions, so that it is possible to be infected simultaneously by more than one disease. For travellers, dengue fever diagnosis should be considered in anyone who develops a fever within two weeks of being in the tropics or subtropics.

Warning symptoms of severe dengue include abdominal pain, persistent vomiting, odema, bleeding, lethargy, and liver enlargement. Once again, these symptoms can be confused with other diseases such as malaria, gastroenteritis, leptospirosis, and typhus.

Blood tests can be used to confirm a diagnosis of dengue. During the first few days of infection, enzyme-linked immunosorbent assay (ELISA) can be used to detect the NS1 antigen; however this antigen is produced by all flaviviruses. Four or five days into the infection, it is possible to reliably detect anti-dengue IgM antibodies, but this does not determine the serotype. Nucleic acid amplification tests provide the most reliable method of diagnosis.

== Prevention ==
=== Mosquito control ===
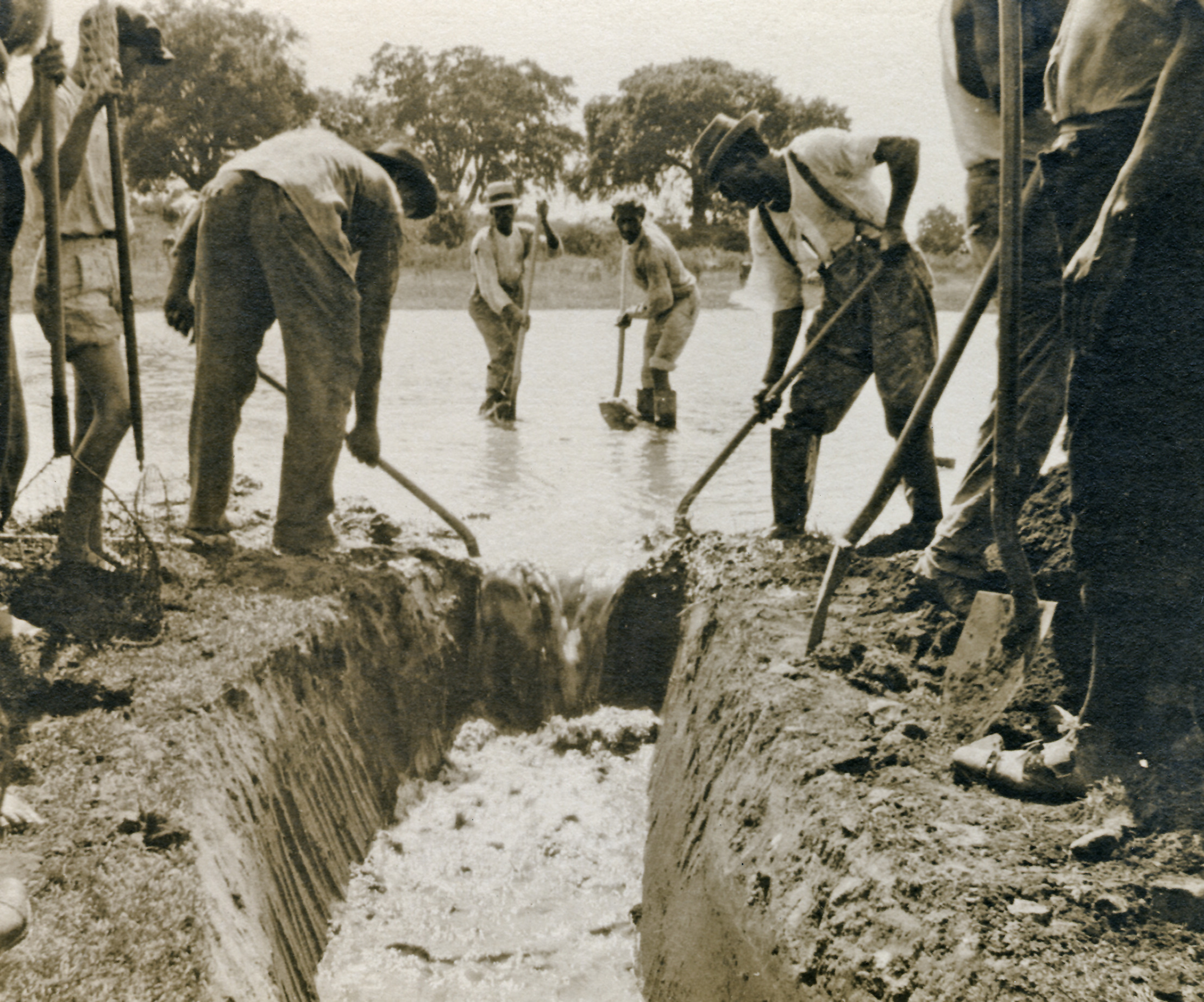
A 1920s photograph of efforts to disperse standing water and thus decrease mosquito populations

The principal risk for infection with dengue is the bite of an infected mosquito. This is more probable in areas where the disease is endemic, especially where there is high population density, poor sanitation, and standing water where mosquitoes can breed. It can be mitigated by taking steps to avoid bites such as by wearing clothing that fully covers the skin, using mosquito netting while resting, and/or the application of insect repellent (DEET being the most effective); it is also advisable to treat clothing, nets and tents with 0.5% permethrin.

Protection of the home can be achieved with door and window screens, by using air conditioning, and by regularly emptying and cleaning all receptacles both indoors and outdoors which may accumulate water (such as buckets, planters, pools or trashcans).

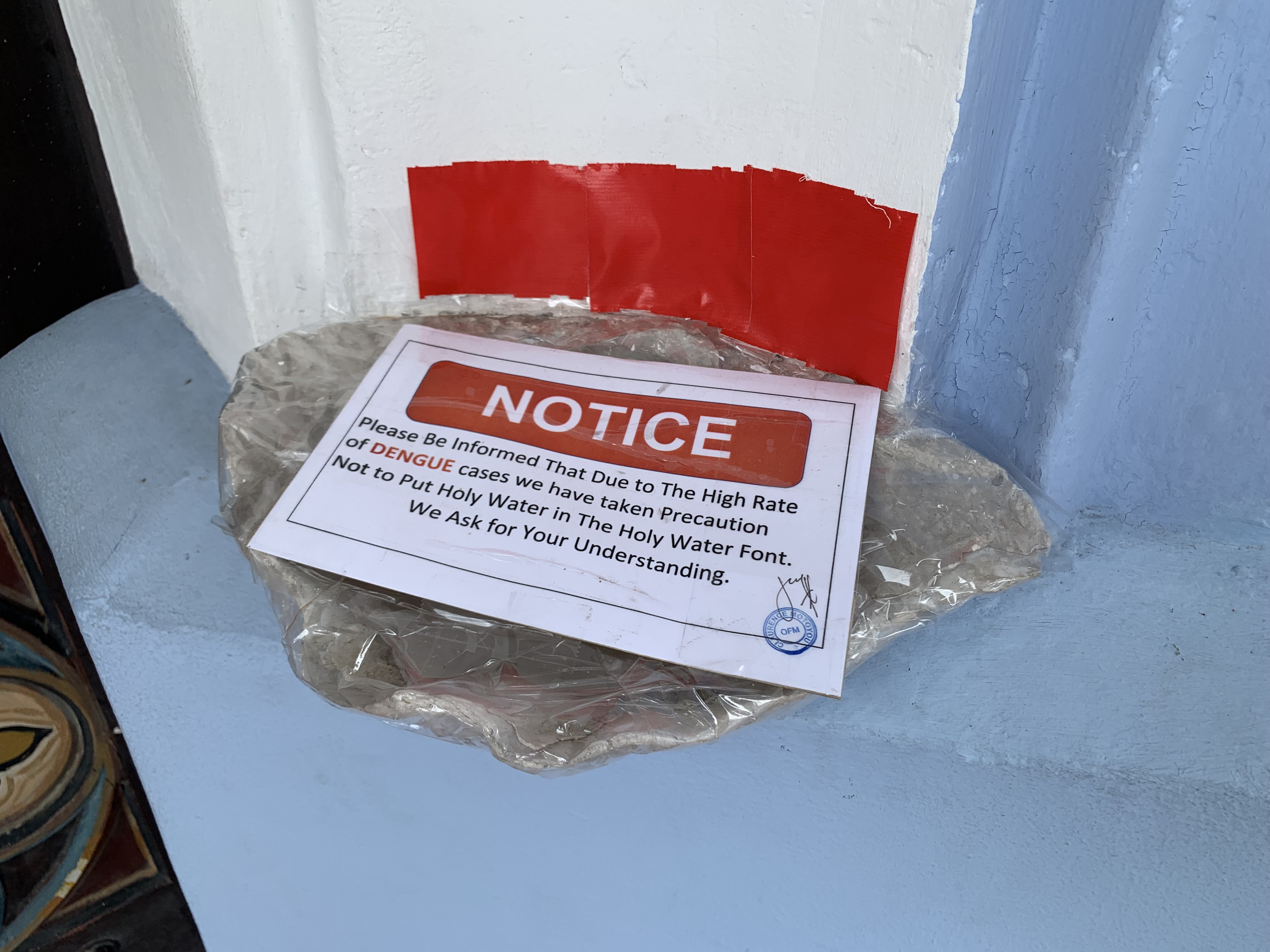
A holy water font at the Church of the Immaculate Conception in Johor Bahru, Malaysia was closed as a part of open water sources elimination in response to the dengue outbreak in the area.

The primary method of controlling A. aegypti is by eliminating its habitats. This is done by eliminating open sources of water, or if this is not possible, by adding insecticides or biological control agents to these areas. Generalized spraying with organophosphate or pyrethroid insecticides, while sometimes done, is not thought to be effective. Reducing open collections of water through environmental modification is the preferred method of control, given the concerns of negative health effects from insecticides and greater logistical difficulties with control agents. Ideally, mosquito control would be a community activity, e.g. when all members of a community clear blocked gutters and street drains and keep their yards free of containers with standing water. If residences have direct water connections this eliminates the need for wells or street pumps and water-carrying containers.

=== Vaccine ===
As of March 2024, there are two vaccines to protect against dengue infection; Dengvaxia and Qdenga.

Dengvaxia (formerly CYD-TDV) became available in 2015, and is approved for use in the US, EU and in some Asian and Latin American countries. It is an attenuated virus, is suitable for individuals aged 6–45 years and protects against all four serotypes of dengue. Due to safety concerns about antibody-dependent enhancement (ADE), it should only be given to individuals who have previously been infected with dengue, in order to protect them from reinfection. It is given subcutaneously as three doses at six month intervals. The manufacturer, Sanofi-Pasteur, has stated that they will cease manufacturing Dengvaxia during 2026, citing a lack of global demand.

Qdenga (formerly TAK-003) completed clinical trials in 2022 and was approved for use in the European Union in December 2022; it has been approved by a number of other countries including Indonesia and Brazil, and has been recommended by the SAGE committee of the World Health Organization. It is indicated for the prevention of dengue disease in individuals four years of age and older, and can be administered to people who have not been previously infected with dengue. It is a live attenuated vaccine containing the four serotypes of dengue virus, administered subcutaneously as two doses three months apart.

The Department of Health (DOH) in the Philippines expanded a dengue vaccination pilot program to major urban centers in 2025 and 2026 to reduce severe dengue cases, following promising early results.

== Treatment ==
As of July 2024, there is no specific antiviral treatment available for dengue fever.

Most cases of dengue fever have mild symptoms, and recovery takes place in a few days. No treatment is required for these cases. Acetaminophen (Paracetamol, Tylenol) may be used to relieve mild fever or pain. Other common pain relievers, including aspirin, ibuprofen (Advil, Motrin IB, others) and naproxen sodium (Aleve) should be avoided as they can increase the risk of bleeding complications.

For moderate illness, those who can drink, are passing urine, have no warning signs and are otherwise reasonably healthy can be monitored carefully at home. Supportive care with analgesics, fluid replacement, and bed rest are recommended.

Severe dengue is a life-threatening emergency, requiring hospitalization and potentially intensive care. Warning signs include dehydration, decreasing platelets and increasing hematocrit. Treatment modes include intravenous fluids, and transfusion with platelets or plasma.

== Prognosis ==
Dengue fever deaths

Most people with dengue recover without any ongoing problems. The risk of death among those with severe dengue is 0.8–2.5%, and with adequate treatment this is less than 1%. However, those who develop significantly low blood pressure may have a fatality rate of up to 26%. The risk of death among children less than five years old is four times greater than among those over the age of 10. Elderly people are also at higher risk of a poor outcome.

== Epidemiology ==
Dengue fever infections

As of March 2023, dengue is endemic in more than 100 countries with cases reported in every continent with the exception of Antarctica. The Americas, Southeast Asia and the Western Pacific regions are the most seriously affected. In October 2023, the first confirmed symptomatic case of locally acquired dengue (i.e. not while travelling) in the US was identified in California. By November 2026 Florida had recorded 523 cases, 72 of these locally acquired. One woman died.

It is difficult to estimate the full extent of the disease, as many cases are mild and not correctly diagnosed. WHO currently estimates that 3.9 billion people are at risk of dengue infection. In 2013, it was estimated that 390 million dengue infections occur every year, with 500,000 of these developing severe symptoms and 25,000 deaths. Generally, areas where dengue is endemic have only one serotype of the virus in circulation. The disease is said to be hyperendemic in areas where more than one serotype is circulating; this increases the risk of severe disease on a second or subsequent infection.

Infections are most commonly acquired in urban environments where the virus is primarily transmitted by the mosquito species Aedes aegypti. This species has adapted to the urban environment, is generally found close to human habitation, prefers humans as its host, and takes advantage of small bodies of standing water (such as tanks and buckets) in which to breed. In rural settings the virus is transmitted to humans by A. aegypti and other related mosquitoes such as Aedes albopictus. Both these species have expanding ranges. There are two subspecies of Aedes aegypti, where Aedes aegypti formosus can be found in natural habitats such as forests and Aedes aegypti aegypti has adapted to urban domestic habitats.

Dengue has increased in incidence in recent decades, with WHO recording a ten fold increase between 2010 and 2019 (from 500,000 to 5 million recorded cases). This increase is tied closely to the increasing range of Aedes mosquitoes, which is attributed to a combination of urbanization, population growth, and an increasingly warm climate. In endemic areas, dengue infections peak when rainfall is optimal for mosquito breeding.

The disease infects all races, sexes, and ages equally. In endemic areas, the infection is most commonly seen in children who then acquire a lifelong partial immunity.

=== Climate change ===
Climate change has been increasingly recognized as a contributing factor to the changing epidemiology of dengue fever. Rising global temperatures can accelerate the life cycle of Aedes mosquitoes, increase biting frequency, and shorten the extrinsic incubation period of the dengue virus, thereby enhancing transmission efficiency. These effects are influenced by temperature-dependent vector competence and viral replication dynamics. Climate change is widely recognized as a key driver of vector-borne disease dynamics. In addition, changes in precipitation patterns, including increased rainfall, flooding, and humidity, can create more breeding sites through the accumulation of standing water, particularly in densely populated urban and peri-urban environments.

Climate variability has also been associated with the geographic expansion of dengue into regions that were previously considered non-endemic, including higher altitudes and temperate zones. Warmer temperatures enable Aedes mosquitoes to survive and reproduce in new environments, increasing the population at risk and contributing to seasonal shifts in transmission patterns. These changes are further amplified by urbanization, population growth, and inadequate water management systems, which facilitate vector proliferation and increase human exposure.

The One Health approach considers connections between environmental change, vector ecology, and human behavior. Climate-driven shifts in ecosystems affect mosquito habitats. Human factors like housing, waste management, and water storage also shape how dengue spreads. This systems-based view highlights why we need integrated approaches considering environmental, vector, and human health together.

Prevention and control strategies for dengue now emphasize climate-informed and multisectoral approaches. These strategies include vector control (by eliminating standing water and using insecticides), improved urban infrastructure and water management, and community behavioral interventions. Early warning systems that use climate data in predictive models for outbreaks are also important.

== History ==
The first historical record of a case of probable dengue fever is in a Chinese medical encyclopedia from the Jin dynasty (266–420) which referred to a "water poison" associated with flying insects.

The principal mosquito vector of dengue, Aedes aegypti, spread out of Africa in the 15th to 19th centuries due to the slave trade and consequent expansion of international trading. There have been descriptions of epidemics of dengue-like illness in the 17th century, and it is likely that epidemics in Jakarta, Cairo, and Philadelphia during the 18th century were caused by dengue.

It is assumed that dengue was constantly present in many tropical urban centres throughout the 19th and early 20th centuries, even though significant outbreaks were infrequent. The marked spread of dengue during and after the Second World War has been attributed partly to disruption caused by the war, and partly to subsequent urbanisation in south-east Asia. As novel serotypes were introduced to regions already endemic with dengue, outbreaks of severe disease followed. The severe hemorrhagic form of the disease was first reported in the Philippines in 1953; by the 1970s, it had become recognised as a major cause of child mortality in Southeast Asia.

In Central and South America, the Aedes mosquito had been eradicated in the 1950s; however the eradication program was discontinued in the 1970s and the disease re-established itself in the region during the 1980s, becoming hyperendemic and causing significant epidemics.

Dengue has continued to increase in prevalence during the 21st century, as the mosquito vector continues to expand its range. This is attributed partly to continuing urbanisation, and partly to the impact of a warmer climate.

=== Etymology ===
The name came into English in the early 19th century from West Indian Spanish, which borrowed it from the Kiswahili term dinga / denga, meaning "cramp-like seizure" – the full term of the condition being ki-dinga pepo: "a sort of cramp-like seizure (caused by) an evil spirit". The borrowed term changed to dengue in Spanish due to this word existing in Spanish with the meaning "fastidiousness" and this folk etymology referring to the dislike of movement by affected patients. Slaves in the West Indies having contracted dengue were said to have the posture and gait of a dandy, and the disease was known as "dandy fever".

The term break-bone fever was applied by Benjamin Rush, in a 1789 report of the 1780 epidemic in Philadelphia, due to the associated muscle and joint pains. In the report title he uses the more formal term "bilious remitting fever". The term dengue fever came into general use only after 1828. Other historical terms include "breakheart fever" and "la dengue". Terms for severe disease include "infectious thrombocytopenic purpura" and "Philippine", "Thai", or "Singapore hemorrhagic fever".

== Society and culture ==
=== Blood donation ===
Outbreaks of dengue fever increase the need for blood products while decreasing the number of potential blood donors due to potential infection with the virus. Someone who has a dengue infection is typically not allowed to donate blood for at least the next six months.

=== Public awareness ===
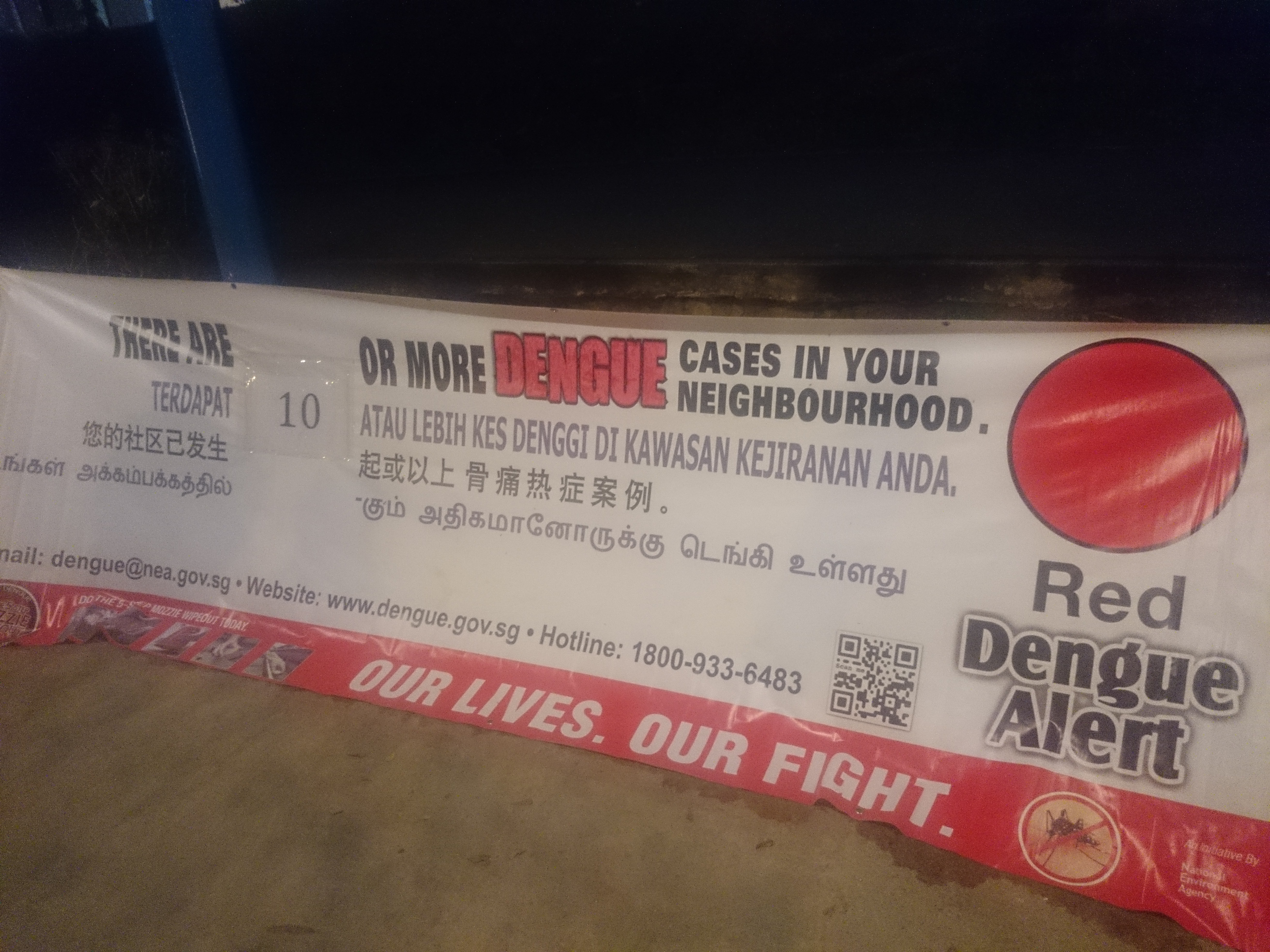
A poster in Tampines, Singapore, notifying people that there are ten or more cases of dengue in the neighbourhood (November 2015)

International Anti-Dengue Day is observed every year on 15 June in a number of countries. The idea was first agreed upon in 2010 with the first event held in Jakarta, Indonesia, in 2011. Further events were held in 2012 in Yangon, Myanmar, and in 2013 in Vietnam. Goals are to increase public awareness about dengue, mobilize resources for its prevention and control and, to demonstrate the Southeast Asian region's commitment in tackling the disease. Efforts are ongoing as of 2019 to make it a global event.

The Philippines has an awareness month in June since 1998.

A National Dengue Day is held in India annually on 16 May.

=== Economic burden ===
Persistent symptoms negatively impact patients' quality of life, reduce productivity, and increase medical and economic costs beyond the acute phase. A study estimated that the global burden of dengue in 2013 amounted to US$8.9 billion.

== Research directions ==
Research directions include dengue pathogenesis (the process by which the disease develops in humans), as well as the biology, ecology and behaviour of the mosquito vector. Improved diagnostics would enable faster and more appropriate treatment. Attempts are ongoing to develop an antiviral medicine targeting the NS3 or NS5 proteins.

In addition to the two vaccines which are already available, several vaccine candidates are in development.

An area of active research is developing experimental models for Dengue, beyond experimental animal models. Organ Chips and Lab-on-Chips have been developed to model Dengue leak syndrome and mechanopathology.
