= Aedes scutellaris =

Scientific classification
- Kingdom: Animalia
- Phylum: Arthropoda
- Class: Insecta
- Order: Diptera
- Family: Culicidae
- Genus: Aedes
- Subgenus: Stegomyia
- Species: A. scutellaris

Binomial name
- Aedes scutellaris (Walker, 1859)

Species of mosquito

Aedes scutellaris is a mosquito found in Ambon, Aru Islands, Seram, New Guinea. It is a vector for the dengue virus.
