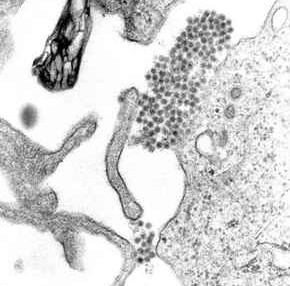
- A TEM micrograph showing dengue virus virions (the cluster of dark dots near the center)

Virus classification
- (unranked): Virus
- Realm: Riboviria
- Kingdom: Orthornavirae
- Phylum: Kitrinoviricota
- Class: Flasuviricetes
- Order: Amarillovirales
- Family: Flaviviridae
- Genus: Orthoflavivirus
- Subgenus: Euflavivirus
- Species: Orthoflavivirus denguei

= Dengue virus =

Species of virus

Dengue virus (DENV) is the cause of dengue fever. It is a mosquito-borne, single-stranded, positive-sense RNA virus of the family Flaviviridae and genus Orthoflavivirus. Four serotypes of the virus have been found, and a reported fifth has yet to be confirmed, all of which can cause the full spectrum of disease. Nevertheless, the mainstream scientific community's understanding of dengue virus may be simplistic as, rather than distinct antigenic groups, a continuum appears to exist. This same study identified 47 strains of dengue virus. Additionally, coinfection with and lack of rapid tests for Zika virus and chikungunya complicate matters in real-world infections.

The Incidence of Dengue virus has increased dramatically within the last 20 years, becoming one of the worst mosquito-borne human pathogens that tropical countries have to deal with. Estimates published in 2013 indicate that as many as 390 million infections occur each year, and many dengue infections are increasingly understood to be asymptomatic or subclinical.

== Evolution ==
Dengue virus is classified into four serotypes (DENV-1, DENV-2, DENV-3, and DENV-4). A single report of a fifth serotype, DENV-5, isolated from an outbreak in October 2013 has not been replicated or further reported on. The rate of nucleotide substitution for the DENV-1 envelope gene has been estimated to be 6.5×10^{−4} per nucleotide per year, a rate similar to other RNA viruses. The American African genotype has been estimated to have evolved between 1907 and 1949. This period includes World War I and World War II, which were associated with considerable movement of populations and environmental disturbance, factors known to promote the evolution of new vector-borne viral species.

An analysis of all four serotypes estimated that their most recent common ancestor existed about 340 AD (95% confidence interval: 280 BC–850 AD).

== Lifecycle ==
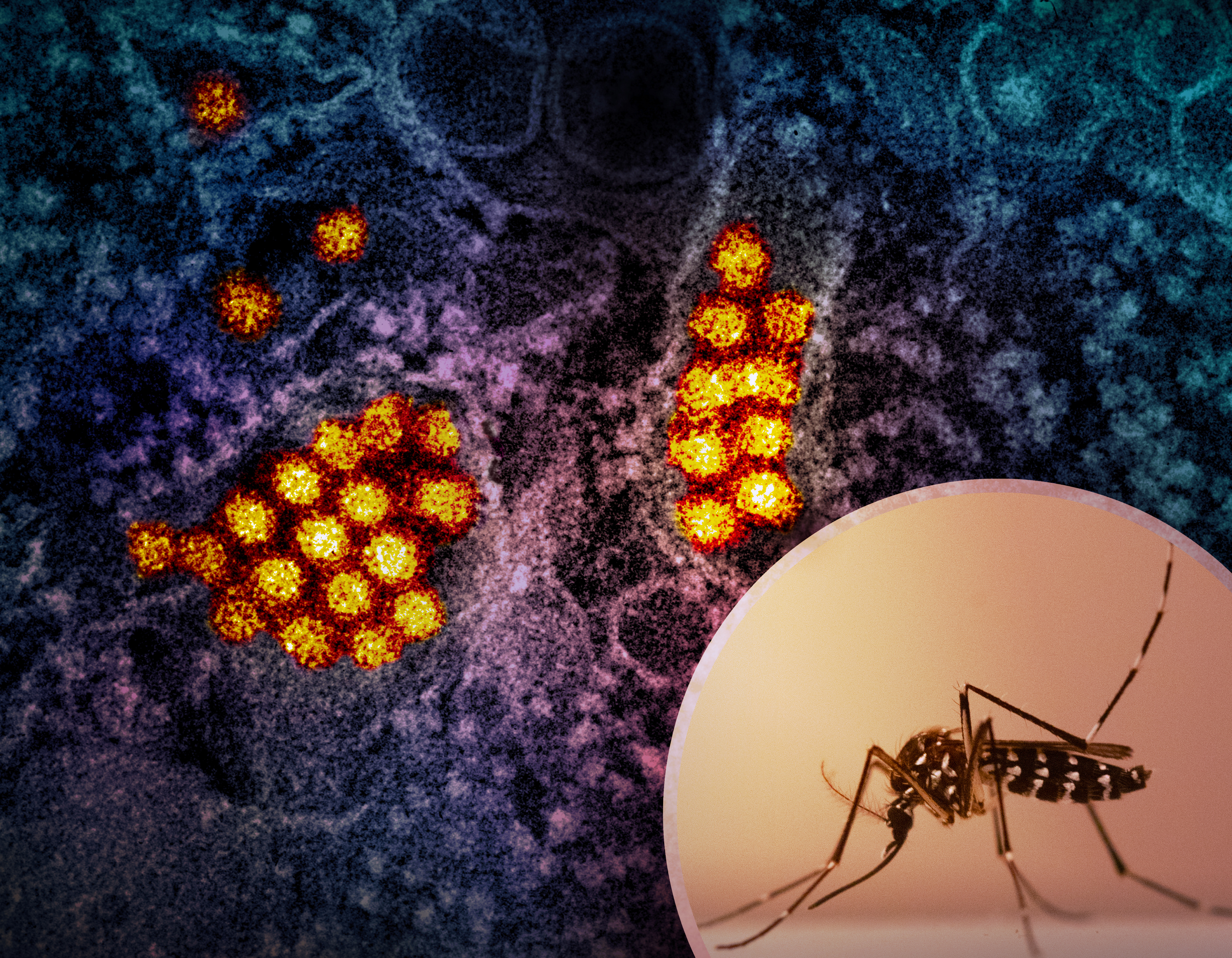
Aedes mosquito and a colorized transmission electron micrograph of dengue virus particles (yellow/red). Photo by NIAID; micrograph courtesy of CDC; micrograph colorization and visual effects by NIAID.

Until a few hundred years ago, Dengue virus was transmitted in sylvatic cycles in Africa, Southeast Asia and South Asia between mosquitoes of the genus Aedes and nonhuman primates, with rare emergences into human populations. The global spread of Dengue virus, however, has followed its emergence from sylvatic cycles and the primary lifecycle now exclusively involves transmission between humans and Aedes mosquitoes. Vertical transmission from mosquito to mosquito has also been observed in some vector species. Dogs have been found to be infected by the virus, but more research is needed to determine if dogs or other animals can serve as reservoirs or are just incidental hosts.

When a mosquito feeds on infected human blood, the virus establishes itself in the mosquito's gut and subsequently infects other tissues. The infected mosquito then seeks blood, biting a different human. At this moment, the human's skin cells (keratinocytes) get infected first. Subsequently, dendritic cells (DC) take up the virus and get infected too. The DC's mobility disperses virus in the body where some other cell types can get infected, as well (macrophages, hepatocytes and bone marrow cells).

Dengue virus lifecycle in cells, both in arthropod and mammalian cells, is typical for single-stranded (+)-RNA viruses. After binding to specific receptors on the cell the virion gets endocytosed. Endosomes usually get acidified and become lysosomes which digest their content. But the acidic condition triggers a conformational change in the envelope of the virion, making its membrane fuse with the endosome membrane, releasing the viral capsid with the viral RNA genome into the cell's cytosol.

Viral RNA is capped and, so, cannot be distinguished from human mRNA. It gets translated by the cell's ribosomes into a polyprotein with 3,391 amino acids. This polyprotein cleaves itself to produce, after several steps, three structural (C, E, prM) and seven non-structural proteins (NS1, NS2A, NS2B, NS3, NS4A, NS4B, NS5). All non-structural proteins are necessary to together create the viral replication complex (RC) which makes copies of capped viral RNA to produce more polyprotein and new virions. New virions move to exocytic vesicles via the secretory pathway and, there, get their mature form before they are released from the cell. One infected cell may release up to between 1,000 and 10,000 new virions.

Recent findings suggest that as the virus infects human cells, host homeostatic processes such as autophagy and ER stress response, not to mention apoptosis, are triggered depending on the infected cell type. The activation of autophagy and ER stress during infection enhances virus reproduction. Attempts to provide detailed summaries of the life cycle of dengue at the cellular level are published in review articles from different research groups.

== Genome ==
The DENV genome is about 11000 bases of positive-sense, single-stranded RNA (ssRNA) that codes for three structural proteins (capsid protein C, membrane protein M, envelope protein E) and seven nonstructural proteins (NS1, NS2a, NS2b, NS3, NS4a, NS4b, NS5). It also includes short noncoding regions on both the 5' and 3' ends.

== Structural and enzymatic proteins ==
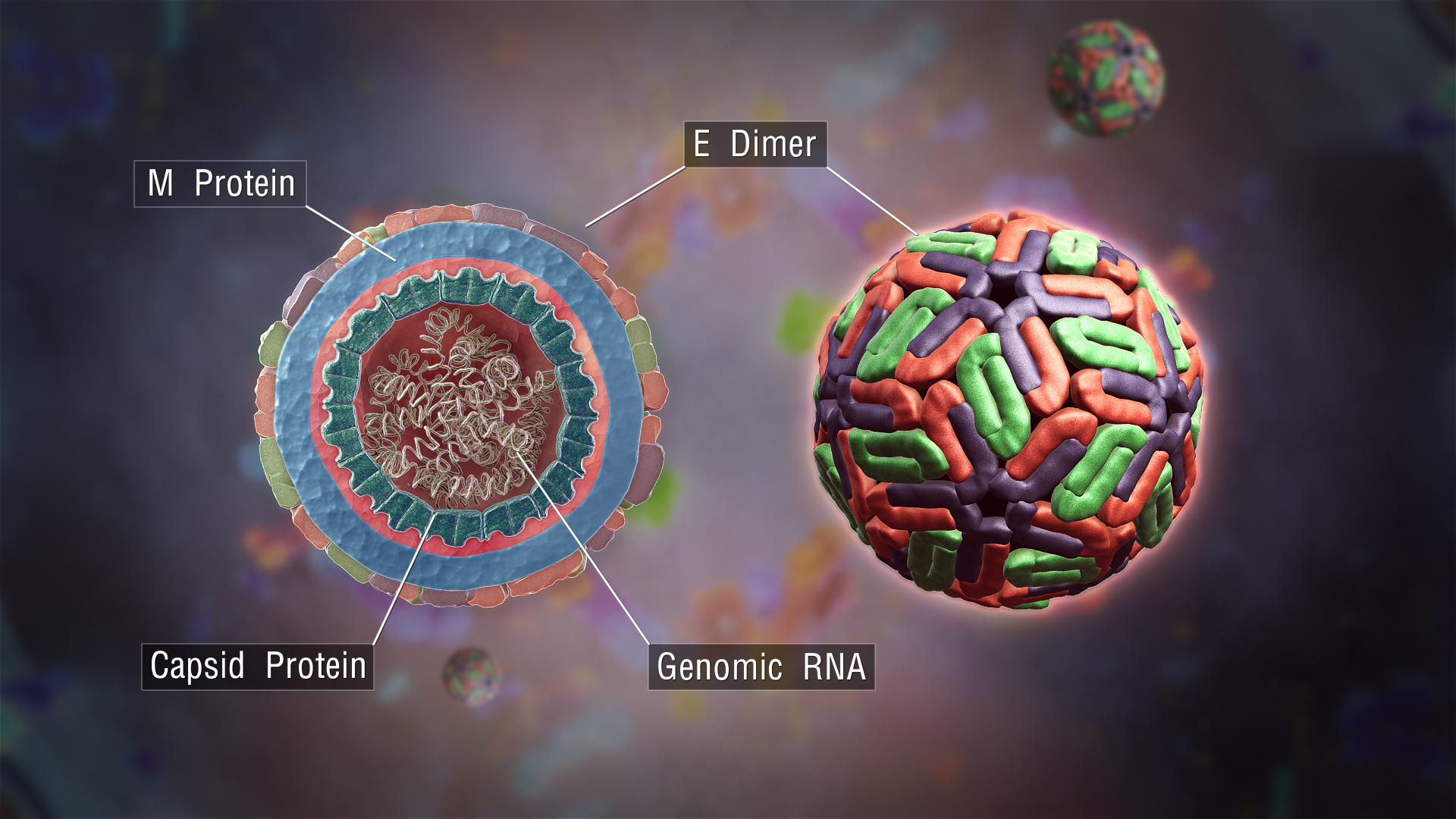
Cross section of a Dengue virus showing structural components

=== E protein ===
The DENV E (envelope) protein, found as a dimer on the surface of the mature viral particle, is important in the initial attachment of this particle to the host cell. Each E protein monomer comprises three ectodomains, ED1 to ED3, and a transmembrane segment. ED2 includes the dimerization interface, two glycosylation sites, and the peptide of fusion with the cellular membrane. ED3 is a continuous polypeptide segment; its fold is compact and immunoglobulin-like. Several molecules that interact with the viral E protein (ICAM3-grabbing nonintegrin, CD209, Rab 5, GRP 78, and the mannose receptor) have been shown to be important factors mediating attachment and viral entry. The membrane form of ribosomal protein SA may also be involved in the attachment. E protein is known to contain physicochemically conserved B cells and T cells specific epitopes, which can be exploited to design vaccine. Recombinant domains of the E protein are used as well-defined antigens in the serological detection of antibodies directed against Dengue virus and as immunogens in vaccine candidates.

=== prM/M protein ===
The DENV prM (membrane) protein, which is important in the formation and maturation of the viral particle, consists of seven antiparallel β-strands stabilized by three disulfide bonds.

The glycoprotein shell of the mature DENV virion consists of 180 copies each of the E and M proteins. The immature virion starts out with the E and prM proteins forming 90 heterodimers that give a spiky exterior to the viral particle. This immature viral particle buds into the endoplasmic reticulum and eventually travels via the secretory pathway to the Golgi apparatus. As the virion passes through the trans-Golgi network, it is exposed to low pH. This acidic environment causes a conformational change in the E protein, which disassociates it from the prM protein and causes it to form E homodimers, which lie flat against the viral surface, giving the maturing virion a smooth appearance. During this maturation, pr peptide is cleaved from the M peptide by the host protease, furin. The M protein then acts as a transmembrane protein under the E-protein shell of the mature virion. The pr peptide stays associated with the E protein until the viral particle is released into the extracellular environment. This pr peptide acts like a cap, covering the hydrophobic fusion loop of the E protein until the viral particle has exited the cell.

=== NS3 protein ===
The DENV NS3 is a serine protease, as well as an RNA helicase and RTPase/NTPase. The protease domain consists of six β-strands arranged into two β-barrels formed by residues 1–180 of the protein. The catalytic triad (His-51, Asp-75 and Ser-135) is found between these two β-barrels, and activity is dependent on the presence of a 43 amino acid segment of the NS2B cofactor. This cofactor wraps around the NS3 protease domain and becomes part of the active site. The remaining NS2B residues before and after the cofactor region contain helical domains involved in membrane binding. The remaining NS3 residues (180–618) form the three subdomains of the DENV helicase. A six-stranded parallel β-sheet surrounded by four α-helices makes up subdomains I and II, and subdomain III is composed of four α-helices surrounded by three shorter α-helices and two antiparallel β-strands.

=== NS4A protein ===
DENV NS4A is a nonstructural protein involved in altering cell membrane curvature and induction of autophagy. In addition to its membrane altering property, NS4A is a scaffold for the virus replication complex and undergoes oligomerization. Mutations of NS4A that affect interaction with NS4B abolished or severely reduced virus replication indicating the importance of NS4A and its interaction with NS4B in dengue reproduction.

=== NS5 protein ===
The DENV NS5 protein is a 900-residue peptide with a methyltransferase domain at its N-terminal end (residues 1–296) and a RNA-dependent RNA polymerase (RdRp) at its C-terminal end (residues 320–900). The methyltransferase domain consists of an α/β/β sandwich flanked by N-and C-terminal subdomains. The DENV RdRp is similar to other RdRps containing palm, finger, and thumb subdomains and a GDD motif for incorporating nucleotides.

=== Complexes between the E protein and neutralizing antibodies ===
Crystal structures of complexes between antibodies and either the ectodomain (sE) of the viral E protein or its domain 3 (ED3) have helped understand the molecular bases of the virus recognition and neutralization. Some of the epitopes are partially or totally inaccessible in the known structure of the mature virion. The corresponding antibodies are, therefore, assumed to bind to alternate or transitional conformations of the virus at 37 °C.

- The murine antibody E111 neutralizes DENV1. Its Fab and scFv fragments were crystallized in complex with the ED3 domain of DENV1. Its epitope is located around β-strands C and C' of ED3, and the intervening loop.
- The murine antibody 1A1D-2 strongly neutralizes DENV1, DENV2, and DENV3. Its Fab fragment was crystallized in complex with the ED3 domain of DENV2. Its epitope straddles β-strands A and G of ED3.
- The murine antibody 2H12 cross-reacts with all four DENV serotypes. It neutralizes the corresponding viruses, except DENV2. Its Fab fragment was crystallized in complex with the ED3 domains of DENV1, DENV3 and DENV4. Its epitope is located around the conserved AB loop of ED3.
- The murine antibody 4E11 neutralizes all four DENV serotypes with varying efficacies. Its scFv fragment was crystallized in complex with the ED3 domains of the four DENV serotypes. Its epitope straddles β-strands A and G of ED3 as does the epitope of 1A1D-2. The structures at 2.0 Å resolution have enabled one to analyze the roles of water molecules within the protein interfaces and the roles of somatic hypermutations outside of these interfaces in the interactions and cross-recognitions.
- The chimpanzee antibody 5H2 potently neutralizes DENV4. Its Fab fragment was crystallized in complex with the sE protein of DENV4. Its epitope is included in domain 1 (ED1) of the E protein.
- The human antibodies Ede1-C10, Ede2-A11, and Ede2-B7 potently neutralize all four DENV serotypes. Their Fab or scFv fragments were crystallized in complex with the sE protein of DENV2. The recognition determinants of these antibodies are at a serotype-invariant site in the E dimer interface and include the exposed side chains of the E fusion loop and the two conserved glycan side-chains.

== Disease ==
Common names for dengue fever include breakbone fever, vomiting, and dandy fever; dengue hemorrhagic fever and dengue shock syndrome are the severe forms. Dengue is found in tropical and subtropical climates worldwide, mostly in urban and semi-urban areas. People of all ages who are exposed to infected mosquitoes are at risk of developing dengue fever. The disease occurs most often during the rainy season in tropical countries in Southeast Asia, South Asia, and South America, with high numbers of infected mosquitoes. The virus is transmitted to humans through the bites of infected female mosquitoes, though humans are not capable of transmitting the disease and are not contagious. The incubation period is 3 to 14 days, while the period of the illness is 3–7 days. Signs and symptoms may include severe headache; retro-orbital pain; muscle, joint, and bone pain; macular or maculopapular rash; and minor hemorrhagic manifestations, including petechiae, ecchymosis, purpura, epistaxis, bleeding gums, hematuria, or a positive tourniquet test result. A recent systematic review and meta-analysis showed that allergic symptoms are one of the core symptoms that are highly associated with dengue severity.

== Mechanism of infection ==
1. Dengue virus (DENV) E envelope protein binds to a cellular receptor. The exact nature of the cellular receptor has not been fully elucidated.
2. DENV undergoes endocytosis. Acidification of the endosome leads to a conformational change of E, exposing a fusion peptide sequence that facilitates fusion of the envelope with the endosomal membrane, releasing the virion capsid into the cytoplasm.
3. Uncoating occurs in the cytoplasm
4. Host translational machinery (ribosomes) translates the (+)ssRNA into a single polypeptide
5. Cellular and viral proteinases cleave the polypeptide into 10 proteins (E, M, C and 7 nonstructural/enzymatic proteins) while embedded on the ER membrane.
6. As soon as functional RNA-dependent RNA polymerase is synthesized, RNA replication can commence. Synthesis is asymmetrical, making 10 times more of the positive-sense strand than the negative.
7. Assembly occurs on intracellular membranes, which bud into the ER (forming the envelope from the ER membrane). Subsequent budding from the ER through the Golgi and into vesicles allows maturation via posttranslational modifications, e.g. glycosylation and pH transformational rearrangements
8. Egress occurs via exocytosis

=== Severe disease ===
Some people develop more severe forms of dengue, such as dengue hemorrhagic fever. Different strains of viruses interacting with people with different immune backgrounds lead to a complex interaction. Among the possible causes are cross-serotypic immune response, through a mechanism known as antibody-dependent enhancement, which happens when a person who has been previously infected with dengue gets infected for the second, third, or fourth time. The previous antibodies to the old strain of Dengue virus now interfere with the immune response to the current strain, paradoxically leading to more virus entry and uptake.

== Immune system interaction ==
In recent years, many studies have shown that flaviviruses, especially Dengue virus, has the ability to inhibit the innate immune response during the infection. Indeed, Dengue virus has many nonstructural proteins that allow the inhibition of various mediators of the innate immune system response. These proteins act on two levels :

=== Inhibition of interferon signaling by blocking signal transducer ===
NS4B is a small, hydrophobic protein located in association with the endoplasmic reticulum. It may block the phosphorylation of STAT 1 after induction by interferons type I alpha & beta. In fact, as the activity of Tyk2 kinase decreases in association with Dengue virus, so too does STAT 1 phosphorylation. Furthermore, the innate immune system's response to the virus is further damped as expression of interferon-stimulating gene(s) (ISG) is restricted by the aforementioned 'NS4B' protein. NS2A and NS4A cofactor may also take part in the STAT 1 inhibition.

NS5 - the presence of this 105-kDa protein results in inactivation of STAT2 (via the signal transduction of the response to interferon) when it is expressed alone. When NS5 is cleaved with NS4B by a protease (NS2B3), it can degrade STAT2. In fact, after the cleavage of NS5 by the protease, an E3 ligase association with STAT2 occurs, and the E3 ligase targets STAT2 for the degradation.

=== Inhibition of the type I interferon response ===
NS2B3-b protease complex is a proteolytic core consisting of the last 40 amino acids of NS2B and the first 180 amino acids of NS3. Cleavage of the NS2B3 precursor activates the protease complex.

This protease complex allows the inhibition of the production of type I interferon by reducing the activity of IFN-beta promoter; NS2B3 protease complex is involved in inhibiting the phosphorylation of IRF3. The NS2B3 protease complex inhibits (by cleaving) protein MITA which allows the IRF3 activation.

=== Mosquito D7 saliva protein ===
Dengue virus is transmitted by the mosquito species Aedes aegypti, which produces saliva that contains over 100 unique proteins, including the protein family D7. Scientists used to believe that A. aegypti saliva, when being transmitted, actually enhanced Dengue virus in the body. The mosquito's saliva was thought to make the virus spread faster due to the weakened immune response of its host. However, a current study has found that the protein D7 hinders the virus transmission into the host cells.

The immune responses of antibodies that are trying to fight off the foreign virus actually increase transmission and make the infection worse. Levels of protein D7 are more prevalent in salivary glands of dengue-infected mosquitoes compared to those uninfected ones. D7 is found in mosquito saliva and was thought to assist the process of blood feeding. Despite the prior assumptions, D7 can modulate the host cell and act against the virus to prevent viral infection. Unfortunately, D7 proteins provoke immune responses, which raise anti-D7 antibody levels. These antibodies inhibit the function of D7 proteins, which enhance transmission of Dengue virus. Although immune responses against D7 proteins might impair their antiviral activity, a study showed that non-DENV subjects have slightly higher anti-D7 IgG levels than infected ones, although it was not statistically significant. Thus, more studies over D7 protein family are needed do elucidate its role on DENV infection and its applicability in medicine.

=== Vaccine research ===
Two types of dengue vaccine have been approved and are commercially available. On 5 December 2022 the European Medicines Agency approved Qdenga, a live tetravalent attenuated vaccine for adults, adolescents and children from four years of age. The 2016 vaccine Dengvaxia, developed by Sanofi-Pasteur, is only recommended in individuals aged 9–45 years who have been previously infected, or in populations with a high rate of prior infection by age nine. Dengvaxia has been approved in 11 countries (Mexico, the Philippines, Indonesia, Brazil, El Salvador, Costa Rica, Paraguay, Guatemala, Peru, Thailand, and Singapore). On May 1, 2019, the U.S. Food and Drug Administration announced the approval of Dengvaxia, the first vaccine for the prevention of dengue disease caused by all dengue virus serotypes in people ages 9 through 16 who have laboratory-confirmed previous dengue infection and who live in endemic areas. Dengue is endemic in the U.S. territories of American Samoa, Guam, Puerto Rico, and the U.S. Virgin Islands.

Several vaccines are under development by private and public researchers. Developing a vaccine against the disease is challenging. With four different serotypes of the virus that can cause the disease, the vaccine must immunize against all four types to be effective. Vaccination against only one serotype could possibly lead to severe dengue hemorrhagic shock when infected with another serotype due to antibody-dependent enhancement. When infected with Dengue virus, the immune system produces cross-reactive antibodies that provide immunity to that particular serotype. However, these antibodies are incapable of neutralizing other serotypes upon reinfection and actually increase viral replication. When macrophages consume the 'neutralized' virus, the virus is able to replicate within the macrophage, causing disease. These cross-reactive, ineffective antibodies ease access of the virus into macrophages, which induces more severe disease (dengue hemorrhagic fever, dengue shock syndrome). A common problem faced in dengue-endemic regions is when mothers become infected with dengue; after giving birth, offspring carry the immunity from their mother and are susceptible to hemorrhagic fever if infected with any of the other three serotypes. One vaccine was in phase III trials in 2012 and planning for vaccine usage and effectiveness surveillance had started.

=== Drug research ===
There are no approved direct antiviral treatments for Dengue fever. Most antiviral drug research for Dengue infections has focussed on inhibition of the NS2B/NS3 protease or NS5 proteins. Reported protease inhibitor approaches have focussed mainly on targeted covalent inhibitors. One drug, Balapiravir, a repurposed hepatitis C NS5 polymerase inhibitor progressed to a Phase II clinical trial before being stopped due to lack of efficacy.

Metal-TPI complexes (with iron, cobalt, and zinc) as inhibitors of dengue virus replication are being examined as novel approaches. Zn-TPI and Fe-TPI showed low toxicity and significant inhibition of DENV-3, while Co-TPI demonstrated antiviral activity at low concentrations. These findings suggest new possibilities for developing more effective antiviral treatments for dengue.
