= EMC9 =

Protein-coding gene in humans

Identifiers
- Aliases: EMC9, C14orf122, FAM158A, CGI-112, Fam158a, ER membrane protein complex subunit 9
- External IDs: MGI: 1934682; GeneCards: EMC9

Gene location (Human)
Chr.	Chromosome 14 (human)
Band	14q12	Start	24,138,959 bp
Band	14q12	End	24,141,591 bp

Gene location (Mouse)
Chr.	Chromosome 14 (mouse)
Band	14|14 C3	Start	55,818,973 bp
Band	14|14 C3	End	55,822,759 bp
RNA expression pattern
Bgee	Human / Mouse (ortholog); Top expressed in: pituitary gland; anterior pituitary; right hemisphere of cerebellum; mucosa of transverse colon; ventricular zone; right adrenal gland; left adrenal cortex; testicle; right adrenal cortex; granulocyte / Top expressed in: facial motor nucleus; interventricular septum; lip; dentate gyrus of hippocampal formation granule cell; muscle of thigh; anterior horn of spinal cord; extraocular muscle; superior frontal gyrus; left lobe of liver; central gray substance of midbrain; More reference expression data
BioGPS	n/a
Orthologs
Databases	NCBI: entry; OMA: entry
Species	Human	Mouse
Entrez	51016	85308
Ensembl	ENSG00000100908; ENSG00000285377	ENSMUSG00000022217
UniProt	Q9Y3B6	Q9DB76
RefSeq (mRNA)	NM_001346874; NM_001346875; NM_001346876; NM_001346877; NM_016049	NM_033146
RefSeq (protein)	NP_001333803; NP_001333804; NP_001333805; NP_001333806; NP_057133	NP_149158
Location (UCSC)	Chr 14: 24.14 – 24.14 Mb	Chr 14: 55.82 – 55.82 Mb
PubMed search
- Wikidata
View/Edit Human	View/Edit Mouse

ER membrane protein complex subunit 9 is a protein that in humans is encoded by the gene EMC9 (previously FAM158A).

Human FAM158A and its paralogs in other species are part of the uncharacterized protein family UPF0172 family, which is a subset of the JAB1/Mov34/MPN/PAD-1 ubiquitin protease protein family. The MPN superfamily contributes to ubiquitination and de-ubiquitination activity within the cell. The UPF0172 subset no longer has a functional ubiquitination domain and the function is uncharacterized.

== Gene ==
Fam158a is positioned between PSME1 (antisense) and PSME2 (sense). RNF31 is upstream and antisense to Fam158a. DCAF11 and FITM1 are both upstream of PSME1 antisense to Fam158a. PSME1 is a subunit of the 11S regulator which is a part of the immunoproteasome responsible for cleaving MHC class I peptides. PSME2 is another subunit of the 11S regulator RNF31 encodes a protein which contains a ring finger motif found in several proteins which mediate protein-DNA and protein-protein interactions. FITM1 is a protein involved in fat storage. DCAF11 is a protein that is known to interact with COP9 and has several alternative transcripts.

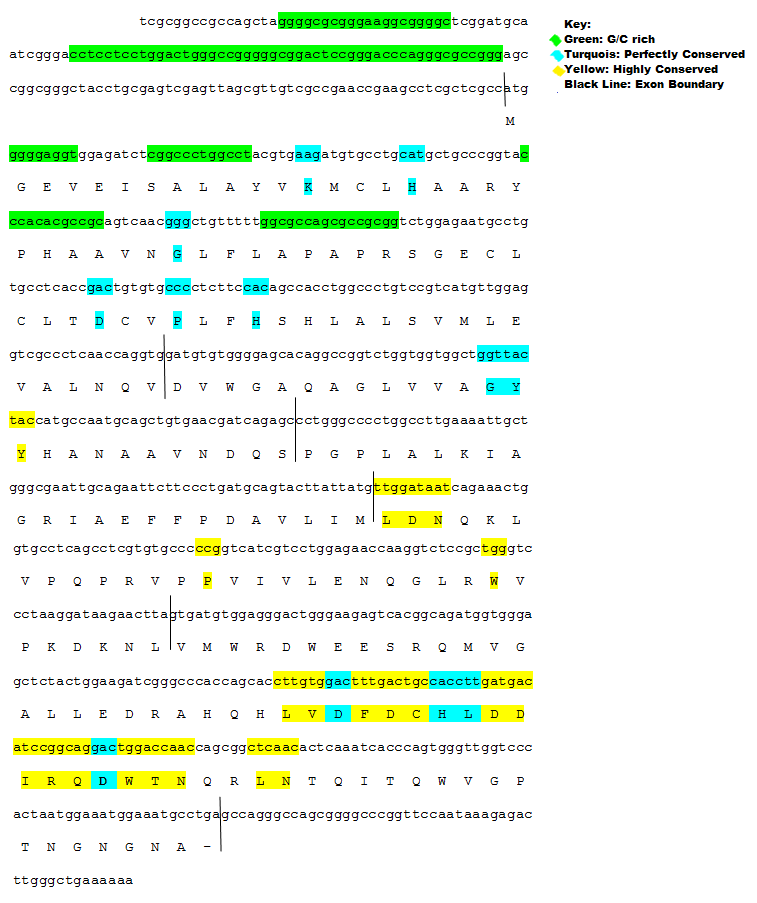
Conceptual Translation of Fam158a annotated with predicted phosphorylation sites, exon boundaries, and conserved regions

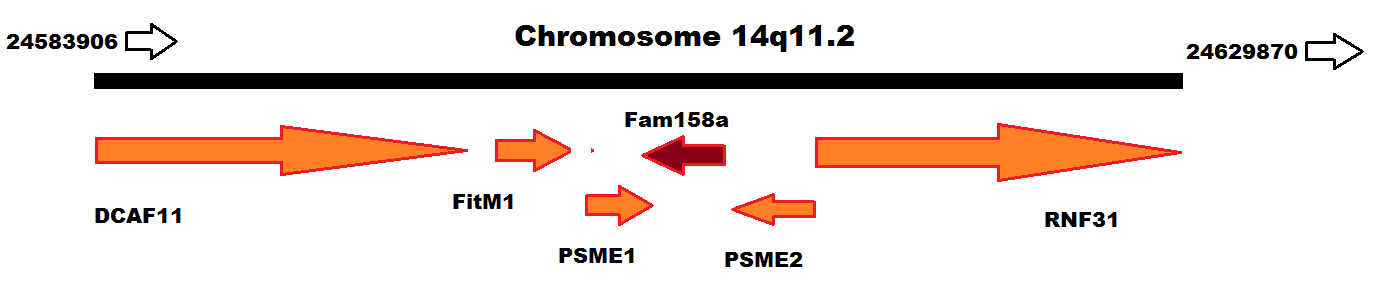
Fam158a chromosomal location and neighboring genes

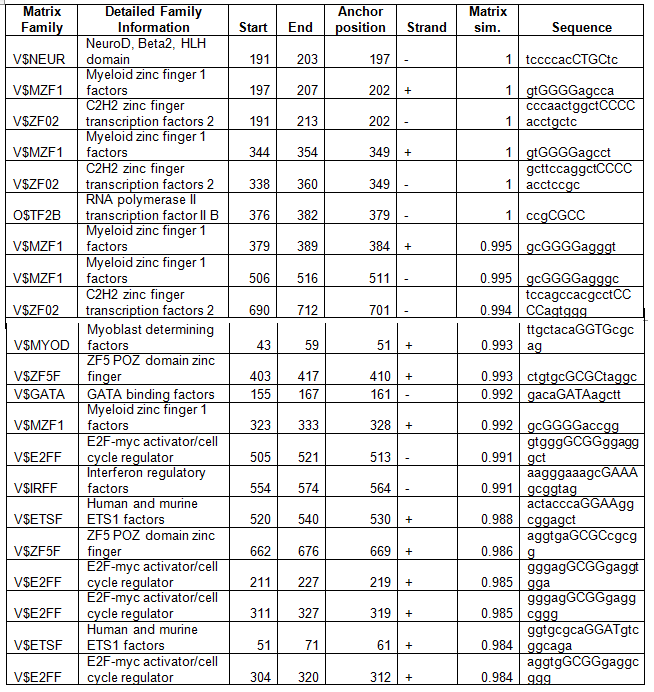
transcription factor binding sites in the promoter of Fam158a

=== Promoter ===
The promoter is conserved as far back as Danio rerio. Softberry's FGenesH predicts two upstream promoters, a TATA Box 461bp upstream of the start site and another uncharacterized promoter 83bp upstream. Genomatix ElDorado predicts several transcription factor binding sites in the promoter region. found that Fam158a expression increases in GATA3 mutants, and as seen in the table, the Fam158a promoter region contains a Gata binding site. Another study shows FAM158A responds to Beta-catenin depletion. Although there are no known beta-catenin binding sites in the promoter, there is a NeuroD site and NeuroD responds to beta-catenin.

== Homology ==
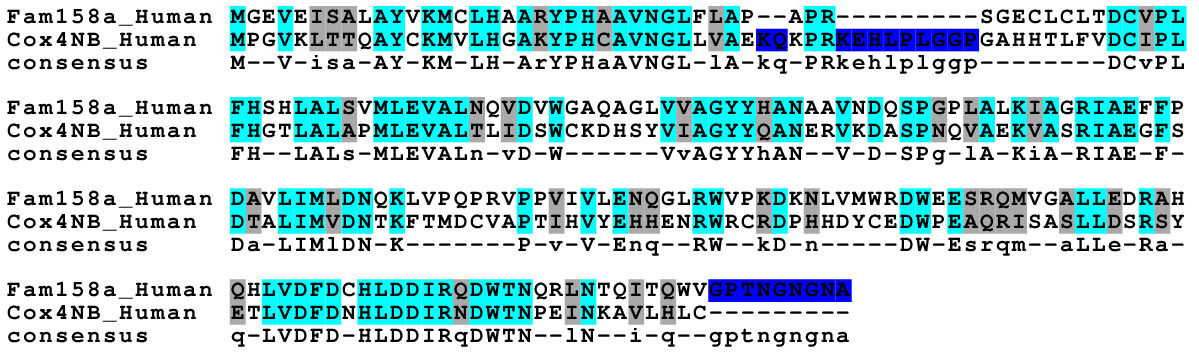
This is an alignment of Fam158a and its only paralog Cox4NB

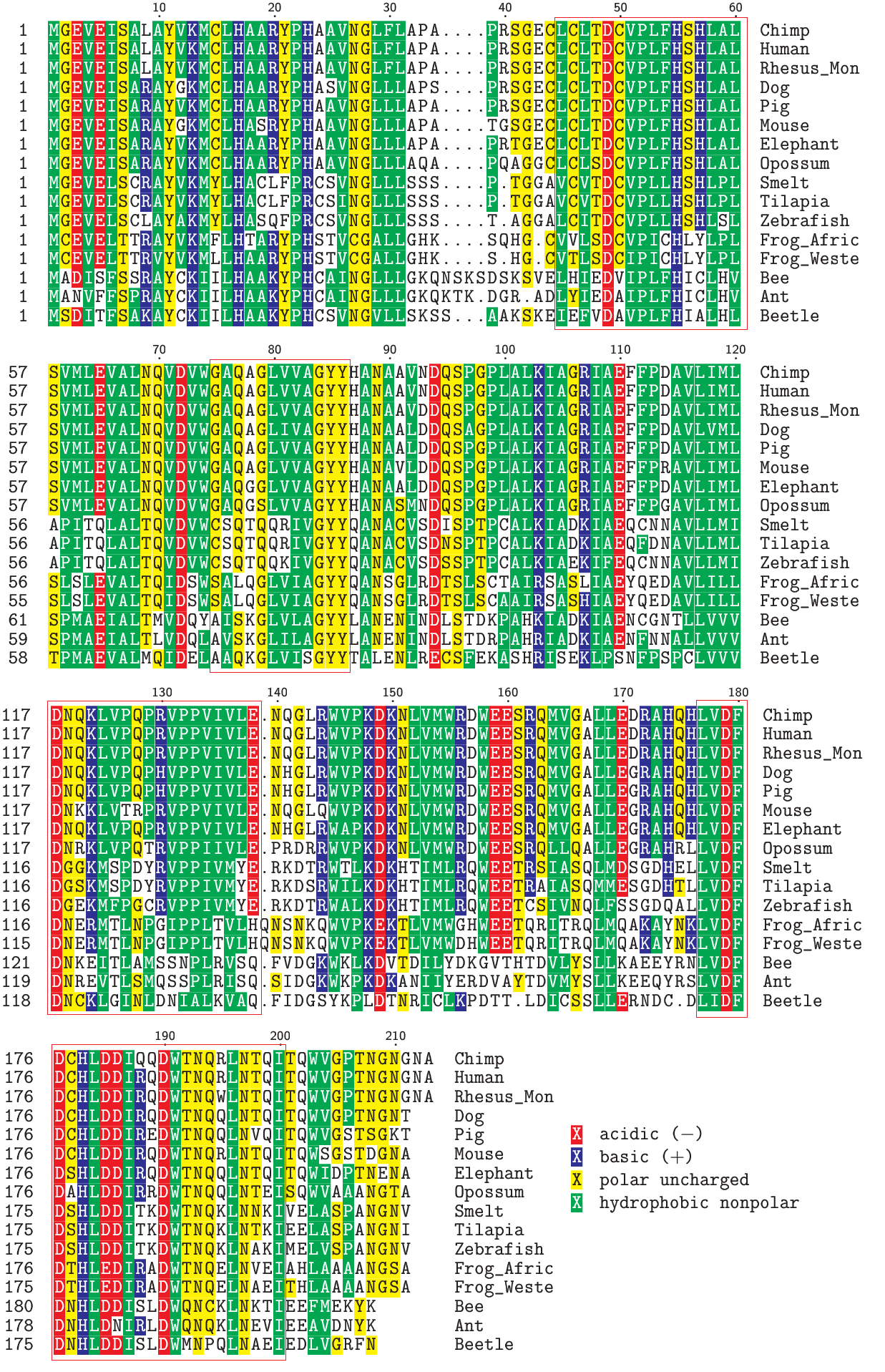
Alignment of protein sequences of homologs listed in the table. Annotated by chemistry rather than similarity. Highly conserved regions marked by red boxes.

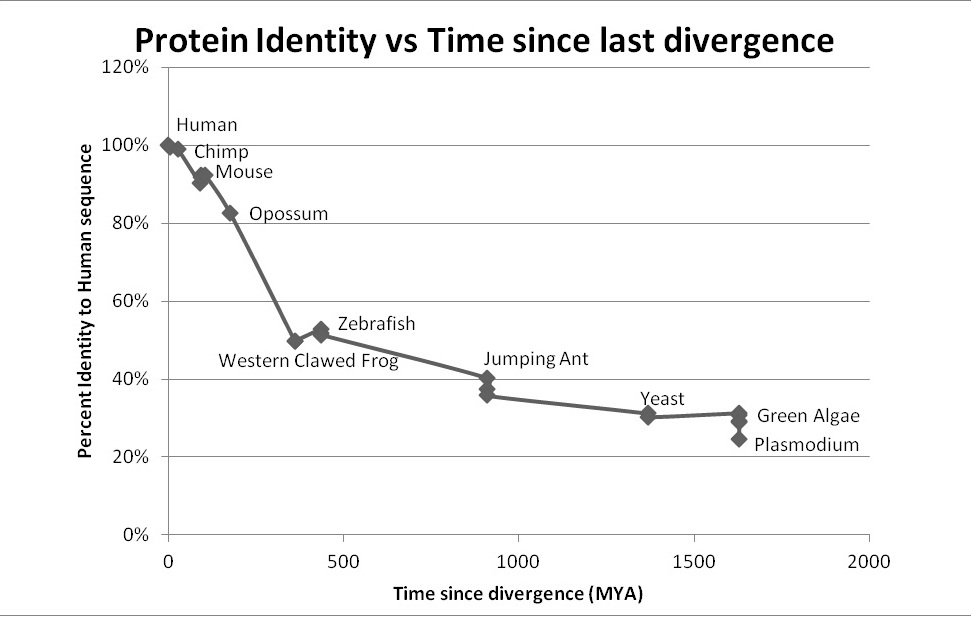
Protein similarity as a function of species divergence.

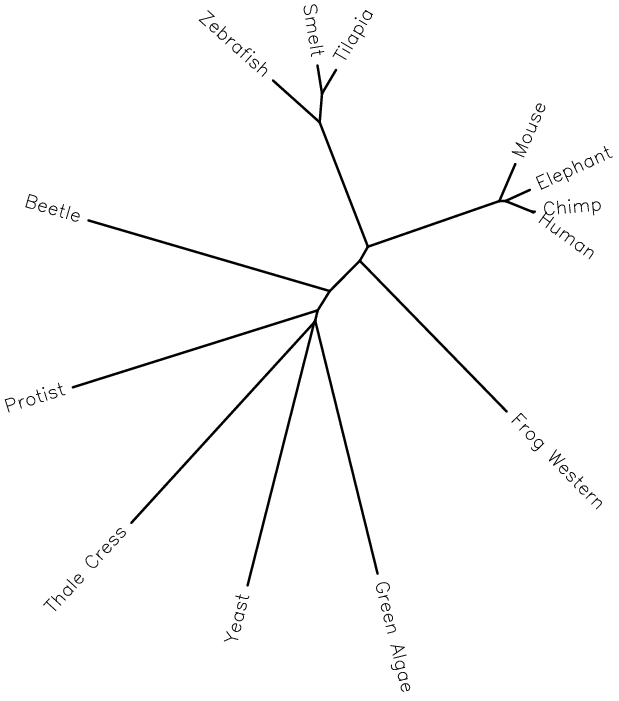
Unrooted Phylogenetic Tree depicting relationships of several species based on similarity of Fam158a Protein.

=== Paralogs ===
Name	Species	Species Common Name	NCBI Accession Number	length	Protein Identity
Fam158a	Homo sapiens	Human	NP_057133.2	208aa	100%
Cox4NB	Homo sapiens	Human	O43402.1	210aa	41.6%

The paralog to FAM158A is commonly known as Cox4NB and is located at 16q24. It is also referred to as Cox4AL, Noc4, and Fam158b. The paralog partially overlaps COX4I1 and has two isoforms. Isoform 1 is the complete isoform at 210 amino acids while isoform 2 is 126 amino acids. Like Fam158a, Cox4NB is highly conserved in Eukaryotes from mammals to as far back as fish. Currently there is no known function of Cox4NB. In most fish and further back there is a single homolog, the predecessor to Cox4NB and Fam158a.

=== Homologs ===
Species	Species common name	NCBI Accession Number (mRNA/Protein)	Length (bp/aa)	Protein Identity	mRNA Identity	Notes
Homo sapiens	Human	NM_16049.3 / NP_057133.2	896bp/208aa	100%	100%	
Pan troglodytes	Chimpanzee	XM_001167788.2 / XP_001167788.1	842bp/208aa	99.5%	98.7%	Identity based on SDSC alignment
Mus musculus	Mouse	NM_033146.1 / NP_149158.1	805bp/206aa	90.4%	77.7%	
Xenopus (Silurona) tropicalis	Western Clawed Frog	XM_002939019.1 / XP_002939065.1	1182bp/205aa	49.8%	40.4%	
'Xenopus laevis	African Clawed Frog	NM_001096278.1/ NP_001089747.1	750bp/206aa	49.8%	51.9%	mRNA missing 5' UTR
Danio rerio	Zebrafish	NM_200126.1 / NP_956420.1	962bp/205aa	51.4%	46.3%	
Bombus impatiens	Eastern Bumble Bee	XM_003489887.1 / XP_003489935.1	846bp/207aa	35.8%	41.1%	mRNA missing 5' UTR
Volvox carteri f. nagariensis	Green Algae	XM_002953071.1 / XP_002953117.1	1677bp/222aa	29.3%	34.8%	
Salicornia bigelovii	Dwarf Saltwort	DQ444286.1 / ABD97881.1	870bp/198aa	31.3%	47.5%	
Arabidopsis thaliana	Thale cress	NM_124976.3 / NP_568832.1	1039bp/208aa	29.1%	44.7%	
Physcomitrella patens patens	Moss	XM_001763974 / XP_001764026.1	609bp/202aa	30.9%	49.2%	mRNA missing 5' UTR
Serpula lacrymans S7.3	Basidiomycetes type yeast- no common name	GL945481.1 / EGN98368.1	203aa	30.3%		mRNA shotgun sequence, no mRNA information
Capsaspora owczarzaki	a protist- no common name	GG697244.1 / EFW44366.1	202aa	31.2%		mRNA shotgun sequence, no mRNA information
Plasmodium knowlesi Strain H	Plasmodium, malaria causing, no common name	XM_002259366.1 / XP_002259402.1	609bp/202aa	24.7%	45.9%	mRNA missing 5' UTR

As shown in the alignment, the protein is highly conserved chemically, although the exact sequence varies. There are also several regions of high conservation (highlighted by the red boxes). The degree of conservation follows the expected evolutionary pattern. The graph demonstrates this by plotting each species protein similarity to the human protein vs. the time since the species shared a common ancestor. The unrooted phylogenetic tree also demonstrates this relationship.

== Protein ==
Fam158a has an isoelectric point of 5.5 and a molecular weight of 23 kilodaltons. Fam158a does not have any predicted signal peptides or transmembrane regions. There are several predicted phosphorylation sites. marked in the conceptual translation as well as the predicted secondary structure. There are no regions significantly different from other human proteins with regard to composition, regions of polarity, or regions of hydrophobicity. iPsortII predicts no signal peptides and localizes Fam158a to the cytoplasm- I-Tasser predicts several structures for Fam158a and the best prediction is shown. Swiss Model predicts two potential protein structures, as seen in the images. The first structure predicts the protein forms a protein dimer, the second as a monomer. Rual et al. found that Fam158a interacts with a protein called TTC35. The function of TTC35 is unknown but it is also known to interact with Cox4NB and Ubiquitin C.

Predicted Protein Structures using SwissModel

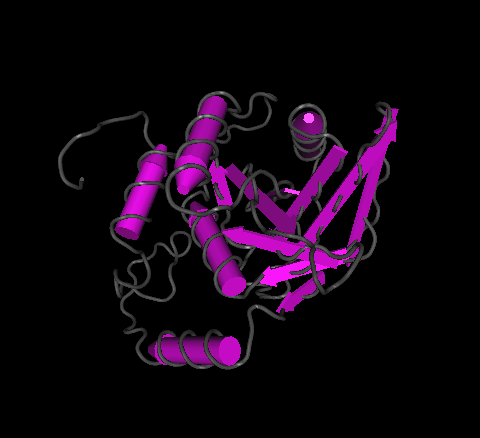
Predicted Fam158a structure from I Tasser

== Function ==
Fam158a is nearly ubiquitously expressed throughout the human body. The homolog in mice also shows expression throughout the entire body. Several micro-arrays demonstrate the variable expression of Fam158a in response to other factors and in various cancer types. None of this information gives any indication of a specific function but the wide expression of the gene and its high conservation indicate that Fam158a plays an important role in cellular function.

== Clinical significance ==
There are several diseases associated with deletions of 14q11.2, but none have been linked specifically to Fam158a. T-Lymphocytic Leukemia with or without ataxia telangiectasia has been associated with inversions and tandem translocations of 14q11 and 14q32 and other chromosomes. Also, syndactyly type 2 has been isolated to 14q11.2-12. This form of syndactyly is characterized by fusion of the third and fourth digits of the hand and the fourth and fifth digits of the foot in addition to other fusions and malformations.
