= Aedes circumluteolus =

Scientific classification
- Kingdom: Animalia
- Phylum: Arthropoda
- Class: Insecta
- Order: Diptera
- Family: Culicidae
- Genus: Aedes
- Subgenus: Neomelaniconion
- Species: A. circumluteolus

Binomial name
- Aedes circumluteolus (Theobald, 1908)

Synonyms
- Neomelaniconion circumluteolus; Aedes circumluteolum

Species of mosquito

Aedes circumluteolus is a species of mosquito that is found throughout much of Sub-Saharan Africa. It is often found in tropical coastal lowlands and Bushveld savanna.

== Life cycle ==
The lifecycle of mosquitoes in the Aedes genus.

Studies of Aedes circumluteolus in the floodplains of northern KwaZulu-Natal in South Africa found that the species' population density reached its highest levels after the plains were inundated by the Pongola and Maputo Rivers, and that changes in the population density were influenced much more by river flooding than local rainfall. During dry months, males of the species mostly disappear while females persist at very low levels; blood-feeding and ovarian development occur throughout the year, with antelope as the preferred host in this area. In settled areas, the females have been noted to feed on humans, oxen, goats and dogs. Immature stages of Aedes circumluteolus may be found in shallow temporary pools, and the species overwinters mainly in the form of drought-resistant eggs.

The eggs of Aedes circumluteolus are rhomboidal, with the ventral surface appearing more curved than the dorsal surface. The chorionic cells of the egg are irregularly shaped but retain a uniform structure over the whole surface. The eggs' micropylar apparatus is unusual in that the disk may be covered with a dense mat of fine filamentous strands connected to small, sharp, irregular papillae.

== Medical importance ==
This species of mosquito is the primary vector for Spondweni virus, a virus related to Zika virus which can lead to an infection known as Spondweni fever. In addition, Aedes circumluteolus also vectors pathogens such as Lebombo virus, Wesselsbron virus, Kedougou virus, Bunyamwera orthobunyavirus, and Rift Valley fever virus.
