= European Network of Information Centres for the Performing Arts =

The European Network of Information Centres for the Performing Arts (ENICPA) is an organisation dedicated to sharing information and documentation among art professionals in Europe and around the world. Headquartered in Brussels, it maintains a website which provides a database of European events, venues, publications, training opportunities, and information centres for the performing arts, according to the European Monitoring Centre on Change.
