= EMC =

EMC usually refers to:

- Electromagnetic compatibility
- Dell EMC, an American data management company, formerly called EMC Corporation

EMC may also refer to:

== Arts and media ==
- eMC (hip hop group)
- EMC Publishing, LLC, an American publishing company
- Essential Media Communications, an Australian PR and polling company
- European Music Council, a cultural organization
- "E.M.C.", a song by Hawkwind from their 1988 album The Xenon Codex

== Science and medicine ==
- Emergency Medical Care, a Canadian ambulance service
- Endoplasmic reticulum membrane protein complex
- Environmental Modeling Center, one of the United States National Centers for Environmental Prediction
- Equilibrium moisture content
- European Medical Command
- European Muon Collaboration, a defunct physics collaboration
  - EMC effect in deep inelastic scattering
- Extramacrochaetae, a D. melanogaster gene

== Technology ==
- Energetically modified cement
- Enhanced Machine Controller, later LinuxCNC, software used to control CNC machines
- Electromagnetic compatibility

== Transport ==
- Electro-Motive Corporation, an American railroad rolling stock manufacturer
- EMC Motorcycles, a defunct British motorcycle manufacturer
- Evergreen Marine Corporation, a Taiwanese shipping company

== Other uses ==
- Early Middle Chinese, the language of the Qieyun rhyme dictionary (601)
- Economic Management Council, an Irish cabinet subcommittee
- Electric membership corporation, a type of utility cooperative
- Encyclopedia of the Medieval Chronicle, a reference work
- Entrepreneurial Management Center, later the Lavin Entrepreneurship Center at San Diego State University
- Erode Municipal Corporation, in Tamil Nadu, India
- Evangelical Mennonite Conference, a Canadian Christian denomination
- Evangelical Methodist Church, an American Christian denomination

== See also ==
- EMC2 (disambiguation)
