= EMC2 =

EMC2 may refer to:

== EMC^{2} ==
- EMC^{2}, the corporate logo of the EMC Corporation

== EMC2 ==
- EMC2, Energy/Matter Conversion Corporation, Inc., a company founded by Robert W. Bussard to develop fusion power with a device called the Polywell
- EMC2, the first computer-based non-linear editing system, introduced in 1989 by Editing Machines Corp.
- LinuxCNC, formerly EMC2, the second variant of Enhanced Machine Controller, Linux-based CNC software
- EMC2, the gene that codes for the protein TTC35

== Other uses ==
- E = mc² is the equation for mass-energy equivalence.

== See also ==
- E=MC2 (disambiguation)
- EMCC (disambiguation)
- EMC (disambiguation)
