= Aedes cordellieri =

Scientific classification
- Kingdom: Animalia
- Phylum: Arthropoda
- Clade: Pancrustacea
- Class: Insecta
- Order: Diptera
- Family: Culicidae
- Genus: Aedes
- Subgenus: Diceromyia
- Species: A. cordellieri

Binomial name
- Aedes cordellieri Huang, 1986

Species of mosquito

Aedes cordellieri is a sub-Saharan African species of mosquito suspected of being a vector of yellow fever. The species name honors Dr. Roger Cordellier, a former medical entomologist with Office de la Recherche Scientifique et Technique Outre-Mer (ORSTOM) in Ivory Coast, in recognition of his contributions to the knowledge of the mosquito fauna of Africa.

== Bionomics ==
Aedes cordellieri is found in West Africa (Ivory Coast), East Africa (Kenya, Tanzania, Uganda) and South Africa.

The eggs of the type species were obtained from a female collected while biting a human 20 metres (66 ft) above ground level, in the evening, in a forest area at Dézidougou, M'Bahiakro, Centre Departement, Ivory Coast. In nature, immature stages of Ae. cordellieri have been collected from tree holes. Aedes cordellieri feeds readily on monkeys and humans through the summer until the onset of winter.

== Taxonomy ==
Aedes cordellieri belongs to the Aedes (Diceromyia) furcifer species group, which also includes Aedes furcifer and Aedes taylori.

== Medical importance ==
As a member of the Aedes furcifer species complex, Ae. cordellieri is an important arbovirus vector in sub-Saharan Africa. Members of this group are involved in the transmission of yellow fever virus, chikungunya virus, and Zika virus, serving as bridge vectors between sylvatic (wild animal) populations and human hosts.

== Medical importance ==
Aedes cordellieri from eastern Africa (Uganda, Kenya and Tanzania) and South Africa (Natal) have been demonstrated to be capable of transmitting yellow fever virus through bites under laboratory conditions.
