= Spondweni fever =

- Specialty: Infectious disease

Spondweni fever is an infectious disease caused by the Spondweni virus. It is characterized by a fever, chills, nausea, headaches, malaise, joint pain, vertigo, conjunctivitis, rash (usually a maculopapular rash which is itchy), and nose bleeds. Most people with spondweni fever do not have symptoms. Symptoms usually begin 3 days after infection, and in those who do have symptoms, disease is usually mild to moderate and self-limiting.

Rarely, symptoms may be more severe. This includes symptoms of meningitis (light sensitivity, vomiting, vertigo, disorientation, neck stiffness) or vascular inflammation (blood in urine, oral ulcers, blood in the ejaculate, nose bleeds, or the maculopapular rash).

Transmitted by mosquitoes, it is believed to be found mostly in sub-Saharan Africa, but there have been reports of spondweni viruses isolated from wild-caught mosquitos in Haiti.

Spondweni virus has similar symptoms with Zika virus disease (caused by Zika virus, which is in the same sub-family as the spondweni virus). With similar symptoms, significant serologic cross reactivity between the two viruses (the two viruses share 75% of amino acids that make up their structure), similar geographic endemicity, and limited diagnostic resources in their areas of endemicity (sub-Saharan Africa) it is difficult to distinguish between Zika virus disease and spondweni fever. Prior to improvements diagnosic technology in 1964, many cases of spondweni fever may have been incorrectly characterized as Zika virus disease.

There have been no epidemics of spondweni fever and knowledge regarding the clinical course of the disease is limited to case reports.
