= Spondweni virus =

Virus classification
- (unranked): Virus
- Realm: Riboviria
- Kingdom: Orthornavirae
- Phylum: Kitrinoviricota
- Class: Flasuviricetes
- Order: Amarillovirales
- Family: Flaviviridae
- Genus: Orthoflavivirus (?)
- Virus: Spondweni virus

Species of virus

Spondweni virus (SPOV or SPONV) is an arbovirus, or arthropod-borne virus, which is a member of the family Flaviviridae and the genus Flavivirus. It is part of the Spondweni serogroup which consists of the Sponweni virus and the Zika virus (ZIKV). The Spondweni virus was first isolated in Nigeria in 1952, and ever since, SPONV transmission and activity have been reported throughout Africa. Its primary vector of transmission is the sylvatic mosquito Aedes circumluteolus, though it has been isolated from several different types of mosquito. Transmission of the virus into humans can lead to a viral infection known as Spondweni fever, with symptoms that include headache, nausea, myalgia (muscle pain) and arthralgia (joint pain). However, as SPONV is phylogenetically close to the ZIKV, it is commonly misdiagnosed as ZIKV along with other viral illnesses.

== Virology ==
The Spondweni virus belongs to the family Flaviviridae and the genus Flavivirus. Due to its phylogeny, it is related to the dengue virus, yellow fever virus, Japanese encephalitis virus, and West Nile virus. It is part of the Spondweni serogroup which also contains the Zika virus. However, in certain Spondweni virus cases, signs and symptoms can appear as early as three days after infection. Both of these viruses in the Spondweni serogroup have serological cross-reactivity and very similar clinical presentations. This is one of the primary reasons that both viruses and their correlated diseases have been misidentified and misdiagnosed.

Similar to other flaviviruses, SPONV has a positive-sense, single stranded RNA genome, which is about 11 kilobases in length. The RNA genome contains 5' and 3' untranslated regions that surround a single open reading frame that encodes for a polyprotein that is specifically cleaved. The polyprotein is cleaved into three specific proteins: the capsid (C), the premembrane (prM), and the envelope (E), along with seven non-structural proteins (NS1, NS2A, NS2B, NS3, NS4A, 2K, NS4B, and NS5). The SPONV capsid is icosahedral and the similar to other flaviviruses which have an envelope consisting of glycoproteins. These glycoproteins aid the virus in infection through receptor mediated endocytosis. Two strains of the Spondweni virus have been reported, the Chuku strain and the SA Ar 94 strain. The Chuku strain was the original strain isolated from a patient in Nigeria in 1952. This strain was originally misclassified as Zika virus, and this misidentification eventually lead to the 1955 South African SA 94 isolation from the Mansonia uniformis mosquito. Both isolated SPONV strains are genetically similar, but they do exhibit a high degree of amino acid and nucleotide divergence compared to the multiple ZIKV strains.

== Life cycle and reproduction ==
Flaviviruses, including SPONV, have a conserved replication cycle. The conserved replication cycle consists of viral entry, virion fusion with the endosome and release of viral RNA, genome replication and protein production in the endoplasmic reticulum, virion packaging and processing through the secretory pathway, and viral release via exocytosis. Flaviviruses use the host machinery to perform all these operations. Since the genome size of flaviviruses is small, flaviviruses maximize their use of the encoded proteins. Most of flavivirus replication is dependent on the interactions between viral proteins and host proteins. A unique step in the viral replication cycle of flaviviruses is viral entry. For flaviviruses, Env proteins on the virion exterior interact and attach to host factors on the plasma membrane surface. Env proteins can bind many different host factors. Variations in Env protein sequence cause the differences in tissue tropisms between flaviviruses.

== Transmission ==
Similar to Zika, the Spondweni virus's primary vector of transmission is mosquitos from the genus Aedes. The two Spondweni virus strains have been isolated from multiple mosquito genera including Aedes fryeri/fowleri, Aedes circumluteolus, Aedes cumminsi, Culex neavi, Culex univittatus, Eretmapodites silvestris, Mansonia africana, and Mansonia uniformis. However, the majority of SPONV isolations have been from one species of sylvatic mosquito, Ae. circumluteolus.

The degree of infection and dissemination of both strains differs by primary vector species. No detectable infection or dissemination of the Chuku strain has been found in two different Aedes species (Ae. albopictus and Ae. aegypti) along with Culex quinquefasciatus. The SA Ar 94 strain had been observed causing dissemination infection in Ae. albopictus, but the other two resulted in failed transmission. When the Chuku stain of SPONV was tested to see if it could successfully transmit into the Ae. aegypti mosquito (the dominant vector of ZIKV), it failed.

Little information is available on the potential amplification and maintenance of SPONV in numerous hosts species. Intensive field studies have been carried out in areas with high SPONV transmission to eliminate potential host species. Numerous isolations of both SPONV strain types along with evidence of antibodies to the two strains were not detected in any rodent or birds collected in South Africa in 1958, leading to the speculation that these species were unlikely amplification and transmission of the virus. Experimental work has demonstrated that SPONV can infect non-human primates. Due to its serological cross-reactivity and similar clinical presentations with ZIKV, SPONV may be maintained and transmitted in a sylvatic cycle to nonhuman primates and certain species of mosquitoes.

== Signs and symptoms ==
Successful transmission and infection by either SPONV strain can result in the infectious disease known as Spondweni fever. Less is known about the clinical presentation of Spondweni virus infections, since a large problem with misdiagnosis is seen, as other viral infections like Zika. The majority of SPONV infections have been reported as asymptomatic. However, in certain Spondweni virus cases, signs and symptoms can appear as early as three days after infection. Numerous cases of Spondweni virus infections have been well documented, and the signs and symptoms parallel closely to Zika fever. Symptoms include:

- fever
- headache
- nausea
- myalgia
- greyish mucoid lining on the posterior pharynx
- arthralgia
- vertigo
- conjunctivitis
- maculopapular and pruritic rash
- epistaxis
- photophobia
- vomiting
- disorientation

While most reported symptomatic Spondweni virus infections have mild to moderate febrile illness that last for a short duration, cases of more serious symptoms and illnesses have been associated with the virus. More serious complications have occurred including conjunctivitis, hematuria, hematospermia, aphthous ulcer, and epistaxis.

Diagnosis of Spondweni viral infection can be confirmed by testing blood samples for the presence of the positive-sense, single-stranded RNA virion through the use of serologic assay, virus isolation, or PCR/qPCR. These methods also aid in the prevention of misdiagnosis of Spondweni viral infection with other viral infections and infections with a similar clinical symptom array which includes Zika fever, dengue fever, Lassa fever, rickettsial infection, leptospirosis, and typhoid fever.

== Evolution ==
SPONV and Zika (ZIK) virus are two closely related flaviviruses. Humans infected by both viruses demonstrate similar symptoms. This suggests that SPONV and ZIK have a similar evolutionary history. The evolution and dispersal patterns of flaviviruses are determined by arthropod vectors, the vertebrate hosts, the ecology nearby, and the influence of human commercial activity. For example, the increase and expansion of Aedes clade viruses in the tropics is due to an increase in human and mosquito population densities brought about by urbanization and industrialization. ZIK virus, SPON virus (SPONV), DEN virus, and KED virus are in the same clade. This clade is known as the Aedes clade, named after the genus of mosquito that primarily acts as hosts for these viruses. Blood-meal data from the Aedes genus demonstrate that mammals are the main hosts of most species. The hosts of the Culex genus, another genus of mosquitoes, are birds. Both these observations support the relationships between Aedes-borne flaviviruses and mammals or between Culex-borne flaviviruses and birds. All the viruses in the Aedes clade are isolated from Africa. This suggests that the earliest evolutionary lineage of these mosquito-borne viruses must have moved to Afro-Eurasia (Old World) and to a large variety of species, including sandflies and large animals, including simians and humans. This explains why SPONV and ZIK are not solely in Africa.
