= EMCC =

EMCC may stand for:

- East Molesey Cricket Club
- Eckert–Mauchly Computer Corporation
- European Market Coupling Company
- European Mentoring and Coaching Council
- European Monitoring Centre on Change
- Evangelical Methodist Church Conference

== Colleges in the United States ==
- East Mississippi Community College
- Eastern Maine Community College
- Estrella Mountain Community College

== Other uses ==
- E = m × c × c is the equation for mass-energy equivalence.

== See also ==
- EMMC, a type of computer card
- EMC2 (disambiguation)
