= MC (disambiguation) =

MC is an initialism for master of ceremonies.

MC, M.C., Mc, mC or mc may also refer to:

== Places ==
- Macau, a Chinese territory (FIPS country code)
- Monaco (ISO 3166-1 alpha-2 country code MC)

== People ==
- Magnus Carlsen, Norwegian chess grandmaster
- Mariah Carey, American actress and singer-songwriter, also known by her initials MC
- MC (singer), Hong Kong singer
- MC Hammer, American rapper and actor
- Mc-, also written Mac-, meaning son, a Gaelic prefix attached to Scottish and Irish names
- MC, pseudonym of the Korean StarCraft II player Jang Min Chul
- M.C., pseudonym of the Australian novelist Catherine Edith Macauley Martin

== Arts, entertainment, and media ==
=== Gaming ===
- Master Chief (Halo), the main protagonist in the first-person shooter franchise Halo by Xbox Game Studios
- Minecraft, a sandbox game made by Mojang Studios

=== Music ===
- "The MC" (song) by KRS-One on his album I Got Next
- MCing: Alternative term for rapping
- Music Canada, a non-profit trade organization for companies that record, manufacture, produce, and distribute music in Canada

=== Television ===
- Mayans M.C., a television series spun off from Sons of Anarchy, about the fictional Mayans Motorcycle Club
- Multicinema, a Mexican pay TV network
- Music Choice, cable television channel

=== Other arts, entertainment, and media ===
- Master of ceremonies or mistress of ceremonies, individual responsible for ceremonies, staged events, conferences, conventions, or performances
- Main character, protagonists in works of fiction
- The Mandela Catalogue, analog horror web series

== Businesses and organizations ==
- LVMH (pan-European stock exchange stock symbol MC)
- Missionaries of Charity, whose members use the post-nominal letters MC
- Movimiento Ciudadano, Mexican political party
- Motorcycle club, social groups with a shared interest in motorcycling
- ^{MC}, abbreviation of marque de commerce used in French Canada with the same meaning as the Trademark symbol

== Education ==
- Marin Catholic High School, Kentfield, Marin County, California, US
- Marietta College, Marietta, Ohio, US
- Master of Counselling, an academic degree
- Methodist College
- Michigan Collegiate, Warren, Michigan, US
- Middlebury College, Middlebury, Vermont, US
- Mission College (California), Santa Clara, California, US
- Mississippi College, Clinton, Mississippi, US
- Monmouth College, Monmouth, Illinois
- Montgomery College, Montgomery County, Maryland, US
- Montgomery College (now Lone Star College-Montgomery), Montgomery County, Texas, US
- Morris College, Sumter, South Carolina, US
- Vasantrao Naik Government Institute of Arts and Social Sciences, formerly known as Morris College, Nagpur, Maharashtra, India
- Multiple choice, a form of an objective assessment

== Military ==
- Marine Corps, a military branch marines
- Mass communication specialist, a US Navy rating
- Military Cross, a British and Commonwealth military decoration

== Science and technology ==
=== Astrophysics and astrology ===
- Mars Chart, see List of quadrangles on Mars
- Medium Coeli, midheaven point in astrology

=== Computing and technology ===
- .mc, the Internet country code top-level domain (ccTLD) for Monaco
- Music Cassette - cassette tape, e.g. C60 or C90 for up to 120 minutes of recordings
  - Microcassette tape, e.g. MC30 is 30-minute tape
- Microcontroller (abbreviated "MC", "MCU" or "μC"), a computer-on-a-chip used to control electronic devices
- Midnight Commander, a file-management software
- Moving coil, a type of phonograph magnetic cartridge
- Model checking, a formal verification technique

=== Other uses in science and technology ===
- Moscovium, symbol Mc, a chemical element
- Megacoulomb, an SI unit of electric charge
- Megacycles, a unit of frequency in the microwave band
- Middle Cycladic, an archaeological period
- Micro- (mc), alternative to SI prefix μ, e.g. mcg
- Microchimerism, the presence of a minority of extrinsic living cells in a host
- Millicoulomb (mC), an SI unit of electric charge
- Dichloromethane (CH_{2}Cl_{2}, Methylene Chloride (MC) or DCM), a chemical compound

== Other uses ==
- "Mc-", a prefix used to form McWords
- Malaita Cup, football tournament in Solomon Islands
- Marginal cost, in economics and finance
- Metro Cebu, the urban center of Cebu, Philippines
- Middle Chinese, an historical Chinese dialect
- 1100 in Roman numerals
- Maine Coon, a cat breed
- Montserrat Championship, top division association football league in Montserrat

== See also ==
- CM (disambiguation)
- Mac (disambiguation)
- MCMC (disambiguation)
- Mic (disambiguation)
- MC2 (disambiguation)
