= MC2 =

MC2 may refer to:

- Maison de la Culture de Grenoble, a venue for performances in Grenoble, France
- Marvel Comics 2, an imprint from Marvel Comics whose comic books depict an alternative future timeline for the Marvel Universe
- E = mc², the equation for mass-energy equivalence
- Microids, a French software company formerly known as MC2-Microïds and later just MC2
- MC2, or melanocortin 2 receptor, an alternate symbol for ACTH receptor
- Midnight Club 2, a street racing game released in 2003.
- Project Mc2

== See also ==
- E=MC2 (disambiguation)
- MCMC (disambiguation)
- MCC (disambiguation)
- MC (disambiguation)
