= EMC1 =

Protein-coding gene in humans

Identifiers
- Aliases: EMC1, KIAA0090, CAVIPMR, ER membrane protein complex subunit 1
- External IDs: OMIM: 616846; MGI: 2443696; GeneCards: EMC1

Gene location (Human)
Chr.	Chromosome 1 (human)
Band	1p36.13	Start	19,215,660 bp
Band	1p36.13	End	19,251,552 bp

Gene location (Mouse)
Chr.	Chromosome 4 (mouse)
Band	4|4 D3	Start	139,079,898 bp
Band	4|4 D3	End	139,106,041 bp
RNA expression pattern
Bgee	Human / Mouse (ortholog); Top expressed in: stromal cell of endometrium; islet of Langerhans; sural nerve; ventricular zone; epithelium of colon; gastrocnemius muscle; cartilage tissue; muscle of thigh; smooth muscle tissue; right ovary / Top expressed in: otolith organ; utricle; cumulus cell; ankle joint; ascending aorta; hand; ciliary body; aortic valve; stroma of bone marrow; pineal gland; More reference expression data
BioGPS	n/a
Orthologs
Databases	NCBI: entry; OMA: entry
Species	Human	Mouse
Entrez	23065	230866
Ensembl	ENSG00000127463	ENSMUSG00000078517
UniProt	Q8N766	Q8C7X2
RefSeq (mRNA)	NM_001271427; NM_001271428; NM_001271429; NM_015047; NM_001375820 NM_001375821	NM_001039200; NM_146157
RefSeq (protein)	NP_001258356; NP_001258357; NP_001258358; NP_055862; NP_001362749 NP_001362750	NP_001034289; NP_666269
Location (UCSC)	Chr 1: 19.22 – 19.25 Mb	Chr 4: 139.08 – 139.11 Mb
PubMed search
- Wikidata
View/Edit Human	View/Edit Mouse

ER membrane protein complex subunit 1 is a protein which in humans is encoded by the gene EMC1 (previously KIAA0090). The EMC1 protein is a type I single-pass membrane protein and part of the endoplasmic reticulum membrane protein complex.

== Characterization of the KIAA0090 gene and its transcript products ==
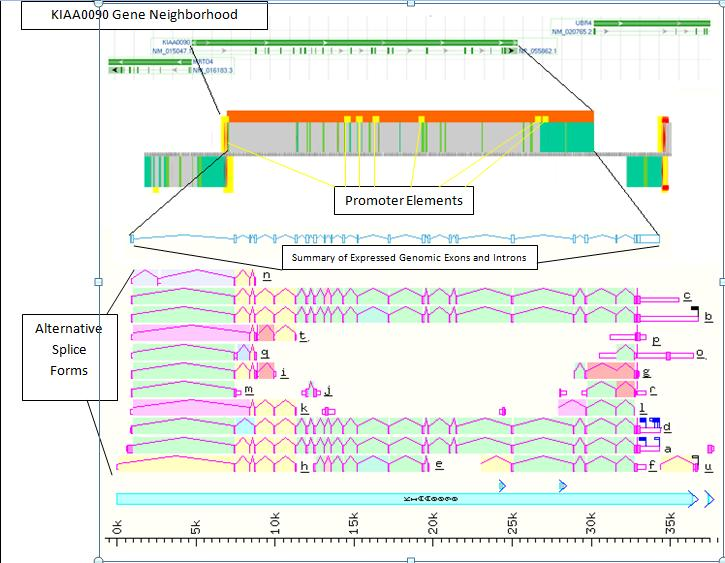
Figure 1: A graphical summary of the KIAA0090 gene neighborhood, regions of promotion, exons/introns, and variant transcript products

KIAA0090 is located on chromosome one in the p arm at location 1p36.132. It covers 36.74 kb, from base pairs 19451486 to 19414744. The gene is composed of 37 gt-at introns/alternative introns with 57 exons expressed in 1 unspliced form of 4253 bp and 20 alternatively spliced forms of varying lengths. The gene has 8 probable promoters. The gene is flanked by UBR4 on its right and MRTO4 on its left. This Information is graphically displayed in Figure 1.

Expressed Sequence Tags and isolated cDNA clones indicate KIAA0090 is expressed ubiquitously in low to moderate levels throughout the body. This includes but is not limited to testis, tongue, lung, cerebellum, brain, mammary gland, trachea, placenta, esophageal, salivary gland, brain, hippocampus, amygdale, bone marrow, thalamus, spleen, uterus, thymus, kidney, eye, heart, gall bladder, prostate, liver, parathyroid gland, ovary, stomach, skeletal muscle, colon, pancreas, and skin. Expression of KIAA0090 changes throughout development (embryogenesis, fetal, adult, etc.)and during carcinogenesis. Evidence indicates a correlation between conditions and expression level but no data exists to suggest KIAA0090 is responsible for any disease or stage of development.

The mRNA for this gene codes for 18 protein isoforms6. The remaining 3 splice variants have no evidence supporting their ability to be translated.

== Characterization of the KIAA0090 protein product ==
Analysis indicates the KIAA0090 unspliced protein product to be 993 amino acids long with an isoelectric point of 7.418 and a molecular weight of 111765.73 daltons. The primary structure of this protein contains 4 conserved domains. This includes a signal peptide from position 1 to 22, a COG1520 WD40 like domain, a leucine zipper domain, a DUF1620 domain (domain of unknown function), and a transmembrane domain. These can be viewed in Figure 2. Several conserved cysteine residues are present at positions 226,235, 335, 364,449, 581, 675, 925, and 985. Several internal localization signals are also present. Dependent on splice outcome and posttranslational modification, these additional signals indicate the protein could localize to the peroxisome, the plasma membrane, outside the cell, the cytosol, the nucleus, or mitochondria.

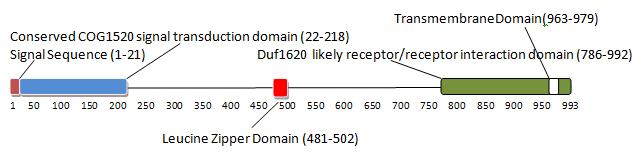
Figure 2: An annotated protein map of KIAA0090 with domain residence and function

Post translational modification of KIAA0090 can occur. 54 possible sites of phosphorylation exist; 33 serines, 10 threonines, and 11 tyrosines. 3 sites of N-linked glycosylation are present at residues 370, 818, and 913 The signal peptide can be cleaved between residues 21 and 22.

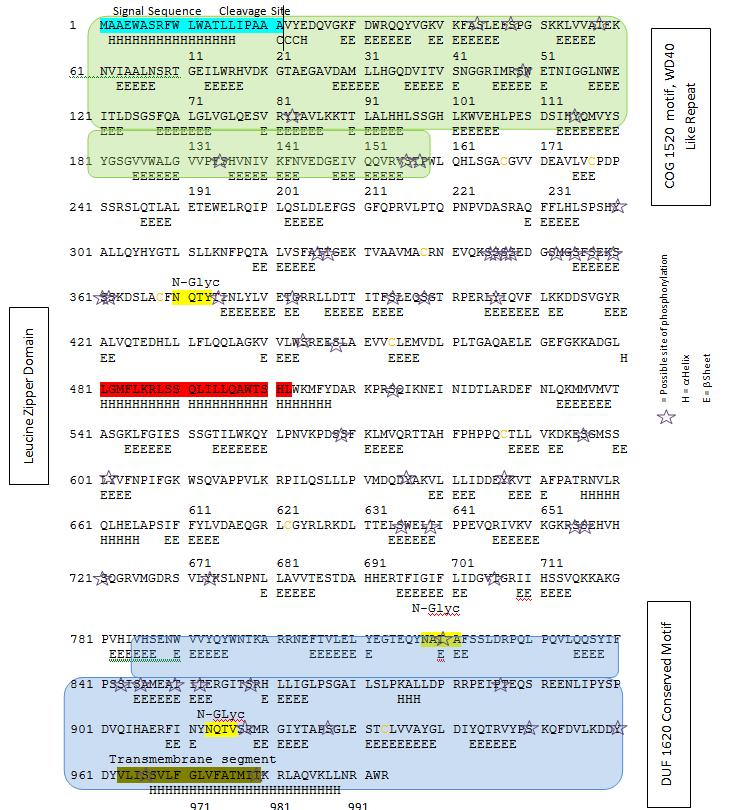
Figure 3: A conceptual translation of KIAA0090 with domains, sites of phosphorylation, sites of N-linked glycosylation, and signal peptide

This information is graphically displayed in Figure 3. Structure beyond the primary remains predicative. Bioinformatic analysis yields consensus data that is also displayed in Figure 3. The protein is highly conserved throughout Eukaryotes both in multi and single cellular organisms. This includes but is not limited to animals, plants, fungi, and protists.

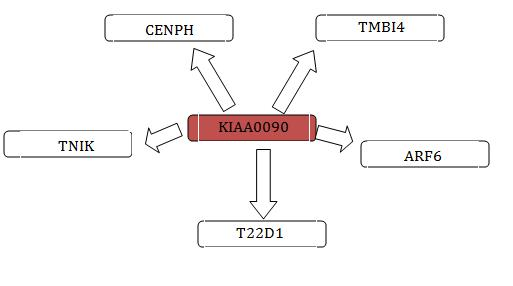
Figure 4: KIAA0090/Protein Interactions

The WD40 like domain COG1520 is KIAA0090s only identified functional effector domain. WD40 containing proteins are signal transducers involved in transduction of signals to binding factors, the centromeres, and other effectors. Coimmunoprecipitation experiments have proven KIAA0090 interaction with these types of proteins; specifically the centromeric protein CENPH, the BAX Inhibitor TMBI4, the ADP ribosylation factor ARF6, the kinase TNIK, and the transcriptional repressor T22D1. The number of splice variants indicates this list is probably not definitive. As further characterization is completed additional interactions would be expected.
