= Jean Vance =

British-Canadian biochemist

Professor Jean E. Vance Ph.D., F.R.S.C.
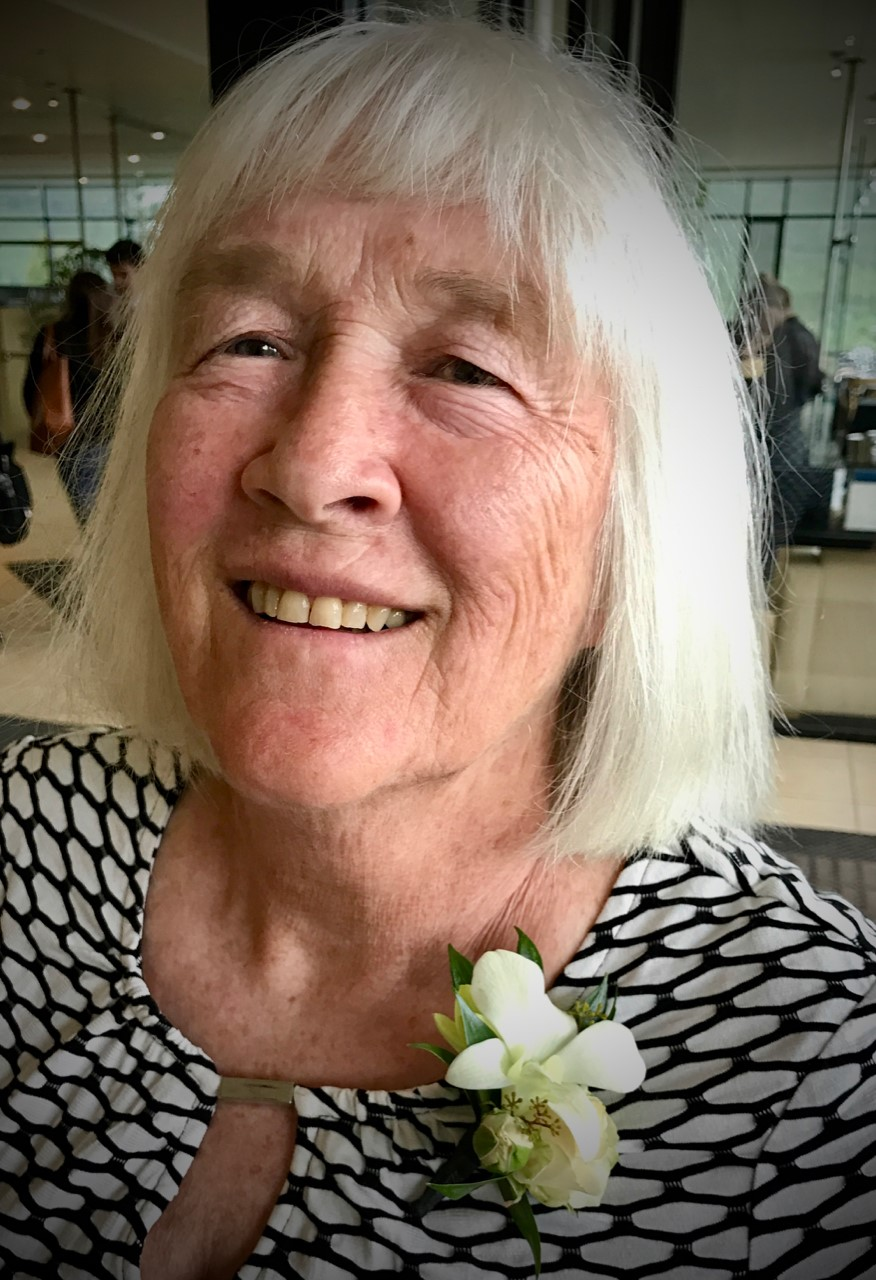
- Jean Vance in 2017
- Born: Glasgow, Scotland
- Citizenship: British and Canadian
- Partner: Dennis E. Vance
- Awards: Fellow of the Royal Society of Canada; Wilhelm Bernhard International Lifetime Achievement Prize, EMBO (2018)
- Scientific career
- Workplaces: University of Alberta; University of British Columbia; University of California, San Diego; University of Pittsburgh
- Doctoral advisor: Ronald Bentley, University of Pittsburgh

Jean Vance is a British-Canadian biochemist. She is known for her pioneering work on subcellular organelles and for her discovery of a connection between the endoplasmic reticulum and the mitochondrial membrane. She is a Professor of Medicine at the University of Alberta, Canada and a Fellow of the Royal Society of Canada.

== Education ==
Vance earned her BSc in Chemistry from Bedford College, London, UK in 1964 and her Ph.D. from the University of Pittsburgh, USA in 1969, where she worked with Ronald Bentley. She performed postdoctoral work at the University of Pittsburgh and the University of California, San Diego.

== Career ==
After working at the University of British Columbia as a Lecturer, Vance joined the University of Alberta in 1987. She began to study the synthesis of the lipids that make up the subcellular membranes that divide the cell into compartments. At the time, the site(s) of synthesis of lipids and the mechanisms by which they were moved around the cell were mysterious. Working with a preparation of mitochondria, she made the surprising observation that rapid lipid synthesis occurred in a crude preparation containing additional membranes, but not in a highly purified mitochondrial fraction. This led her to hypothesize that a specialized membrane compartment, which she called Fraction X, might be responsible for the transfer of lipids from the endoplasmic reticulum to mitochondria. Although this idea was initially greeted with skepticism, Vance was able to reconstitute the transfer of newly made lipids to mitochondria in a cell-free system. She purified "Fraction X", renaming it the mitochondria-associated membrane (MAM) fraction, and showed that it contained highly active enzymes able to synthesize a variety of membrane components. She proposed that the MAM might function as a "membrane bridge" between the endoplasmic reticulum and the mitochondria. Although Vance's work was ahead of its time, it was rediscovered in the late 2000s when other researchers began to identify specific proteins, called tethers, that form the contact points between organelles. The mitochondria-endoplasmic reticulum bridge Vance originally identified is now named the endoplasmic reticulum membrane protein complex and has been shown to be important in the function, positioning and inheritance of mitochondria. Impaired contact between the endoplasmic reticulum and mitochondria has been suggested to underlie the pathology of several neurodegenerative diseases, including Alzheimer's disease. The newly appreciated importance of contacts among different subcellular organelles led in 2018 to the founding of a journal devoted to the area, Contact, published by SAGE Publishing.

Vance has also worked on the transport of lipids and cholesterol to growing neurons. She discovered defects in cholesterol transport in neurons lacking the protein associated with Niemann–Pick disease type C, NPC1, and found that these defects can be addressed by treatment with cyclodextrin. She observed that growing neurons in vitro take up and use components from low-density lipoprotein and very low-density lipoprotein particles, and identified a role for lipoproteins provided by glial cells in stimulating nerve cell growth and protecting neurons from apoptosis.

In 2018 she was awarded the Wilhelm Bernhard International Lifetime Achievement Prize by the European Molecular Biology Organization.

Together with her husband and collaborator Dennis E. Vance, she co-edited the advanced textbook "Biochemistry of lipids, lipoproteins and membranes" from 1985 until the 5th edition in 2008.

Vance and her husband both elected to enrol in the University of Alberta's Transitional Retirement Program in 2017, planning to wind down their research over a three-year period. Their son, Russell Vance, is an investigator of the Howard Hughes Medical Institute and a faculty member at the University of California, Berkeley.
