= E=MC2 (disambiguation) =

E = mc^{2} is the equation of mass–energy equivalence.

E=MC^{2} or E=MC2 may also refer to:

== Music ==
- E=MC² (Count Basie album), 1958
- E=MC² (Giorgio Moroder album), 1979
- E=MC² (Mariah Carey album), 2008
- "E=MC^{2}" (song), a 1986 song by Big Audio Dynamite
- "E=MC^{2}", a song by Ayreon from the 2008 album 01011001

== Other uses ==
- "E=MC^{2}" (poem), a 1961 poem by Rosser Reeves
- E=mc^{2}: A Biography of the World's Most Famous Equation, a 2001 book by David Bodanis
- "E=MC^{2}", a 1946 poem by Morris Bishop

== See also ==
- EMC2 (disambiguation)
- MC2 (disambiguation)
- E (disambiguation)
