= MCMC =

MCMC may refer to:

- Malaysian Communications and Multimedia Commission, a regulator agency of the Malaysian government
- Markov chain Monte Carlo, a class of algorithms and methods in statistics

== See also ==
- MC (disambiguation)
- MC2 (disambiguation)
