= ER membrane protein complex =

Identifiers
- Symbol: EMC
- Membranome: 637

The ER membrane protein complex (EMC) is a putative endoplasmic reticulum-resident membrane protein (co-)chaperone. The EMC is evolutionarily conserved in eukaryotes (animals, plants, and fungi), and its initial appearance might reach back to the last eukaryotic common ancestor (LECA). Many aspects of mEMC biology and molecular function remain to be studied.

== Composition and structure ==
The EMC consists of up to 10 subunits (EMC1 - EMC4, MMGT1, EMC6 - EMC10), of which only two (EMC8/9) are homologous proteins. Seven out of ten (EMC1, EMC3, EMC4, MMMGT1, EMC6, EMC7, EMC10) subunits are predicted to contain at least one transmembrane domain (TMD), whereas EMC2, EMC8 and EMC9 do not contain any predicted transmembrane domains are herefore likely to interact with the rest of the EMC on the cytosolic face of the endoplasmic reticulum (ER). EMC proteins are thought to be present in the mature complex in a 1:1 stoichiometry.

=== Subunit primary structure ===
The majority of EMC proteins (EMC1/3/4/MMGT1/6/7/10) contain at least one predicted TMD. EMC1, EMC7 and EMC10 contain an N-terminal signal sequence.

==== EMC1 ====
EMC1, also known as KIAA0090, contains a single TMD (aa 959–979) and Pyrroloquinoline quinone (PQQ)-like repeats (aa 21-252), which could form a β-propeller domain. The TMD is part of a domain a larger domain (DUF1620). The functions of the PQQ and DUF1620 domains in EMC1 remain to be determined.

==== EMC2 ====
EMC2 (TTC35) harbours three tetratricopeptide repeats (TPR1/2/3). TPRs have been shown to mediate protein-protein interactions and can be found in a large variety of proteins of diverse function. The function of TPRs in EMC2 is unknown.

==== EMC8 and EMC9 ====
EMC8 and EMC9 show marked sequence identity (44.72%) on the amino acid level. Both proteins are members of the UPF0172 family, a member of which (e.g. TLA1) are involved in regulating the antenna size of chlorophyll-a.

== Posttranslational modifications ==
Several subunits of the mammalian EMC (mEMC) are posttranslationally modified. EMC1 contains three predicted N-glycosylation sites at positions 370, 818, and 913. EMC10 features a predicted N-glycosylation consensus motif at position 182.

== Evolutionary conservation ==
EMC proteins are evolutionarily conserved in eukaryotes. No homologues are reported in prokaryotes. Therefore, the EMC has been suggested to have its evolutionary roots in the last eukaryote common ancestor (LECA).

== Function ==
=== Protein folding and degradation at the ER ===
The EMC was first identified in a genetic screen in yeast for factors involved in protein folding in the ER. Accordingly, deletion of individual EMC subunits correlates with the induction of an ER stress response in various model organisms. However, it is worth noting that in human osteosarcoma cells (U2OS cells), deletion of EMC6 does not appear to cause ER stress. When overexpressed, several subunits of the mammalian EMC orthologue (mEMC) have been found to physically interact with ERAD components (UBAC2, DER1, DER2) Genetic screens in yeast have shown EMC subunits to be enriched in alongside ERAD genes. Taken together, these findings imply a role of the mEMC in protein homeostasis.

==== Chaperone ====
===== Maturation of polytopic membrane proteins =====
Several lines of evidence implicate the EMC in promoting the maturation of polytopic membrane proteins. The EMC is necessary to correctly and efficiently insert the first transmembrane domain (also called the signal anchor) of G-protein coupled receptors (GPCRs) such as the beta-adrenergic receptor. Determining features of transmembrane domains that favour EMC involvement seem to be moderate hydrophobicity and ambiguous distribution of TMD flanking charges.

The substrate spectrum of the EMC appears to extend beyond GPCRs. Unifying properties of putative EMC clients are the presence of unusually hydrophilic transmembrane domains containing charged residues. However, mechanistic detail of how the EMC assists in orienting and inserting such problematic transmembrane domains is lacking. In many cases, evidence implicating the EMC in the biogenesis of a certain protein consists of co-depletion when individual subunts of the EMC are disrupted.

A number of putative EMC clients are listed below, but the manner in which the EMC engages them and whether they directly or indirectly depend on the EMC merits further investigation:

Loss of EMC function destabilises the enzyme sterol-O-acyltransferase 1 (SOAT1) and, in conjunction with overlooking the biogenesis of squalene synthase (SQS), helps to maintain cellular cholesterol homeostasis. SOAT1 is an obligatory enzyme for cellular cholesterol storage and detoxification. For SQS, an enzyme controlling the committing step in cholesterol biosynthesis, the EMC has been shown to be sufficient for its integration into liposomes in vitro.

Depletion of EMC6 and additional EMC proteins reduces the cell surface expression of the nicotinic Acetylcholine receptors in C. elegans.

Knockdown of EMC2 has been observed to correlate with decreased CFTRΔF508 levels. EMC2 contains three tetratricopeptide repeat domains (TRPs). TRPs have been shown to mediate protein-protein interaction and can be found in co-chaperones of Hsp90. Therefore, a role of EMC2 in mediating interactions with cytosolic chaperones is conceivable, but remains to be demonstrated.

Loss of EMC subunits in D. melanogaster correlates with strongly reduced cell surface expression of rhodopsin-1 (Rh1), an important polytopic light receptor in the plasma membrane.

In yeast, the EMC has been implicated in maturation or trafficking defects of the polytopic model substrate Mrh1p-GFP.

Recently, structural and functional studies have identified a holdase function for the EMC in the assembly and maturation of the voltage gated calcium channel Ca_{V}1.2.

===== Insertion proteins into the ER =====
The EMC was shown to be involved in a pathway mediating the membrane integration of tail-anchored proteins containing an unusually hydrophilic or amphiphatic transmembrane domains. This pathway appears to operate in parallel to the conventional Get/Trc40 targeting pathway.

=== Other suggested functions ===
==== Mitochondrial tethering ====
In S. cerevisiae, the EMC has been reported by Lahiri and colleagues to constitute a tethering complex between the ER and mitochondria. Close apposition of both organelles is a prerequisite for phosphatidylcholine (PS) biosynthesis in which phosphatidylserine (PS) is imported from the ER into mitochondria, and this was previously proposed as evidence for a membrane tether between these two organelles by Jean Vance. Disruption of the EMC by genetic deletion of multiple of its subunits was shown to reduce ER-mitochondrial tethering and to impair transfer of phosphatidylserine (PS) from the ER.

==== Autophagosome formation ====
EMC6 interacts with the small GTPase RAB5A and Beclin-1, regulators of autophagosome formation. This observation suggests that the mEMC, and not just EMC6, might be involved in regulating Rab5A and BECLIN-1. However, the molecular mechanism underlying the proposed modulation of autophagosome formation remains to be established.

== Involvement in disease ==
The mEMC has repeatedly been implicated in a range of pathologies including susceptibility of cells to viral infection, cancer, and a congenital syndrome of severe physical and mental disability. None of these pathologies seem to be related by disruption of a single molecular pathway that might be regulated by the mEMC. Consequently, the involvement of the mEMC in these pathologies has only limited use for defining the primary function of this complex.

=== As a host factor in viral infections ===
Large-scale genetic screens imply several mEMC subunits in modulating the pathogenicity of flaviviruses such as West Nile virus (WNV), Zika virus (ZV), Dengue fever virus (DFV), and yellow fever virus (YFV). In particular, loss of several mEMC subunits (e.g. EMC2, EMC3) lead to inhibition of WNV-induced cell death. however, WNV was still able to infect and proliferate in cells lacking EMC subunits. The authors made a similar observation of the role of the mEMC in the cell-killing capacity of Saint Louis Encephalitis Virus. The underlying cause for the resistance of EMC2/3-deficient cells to WNV-induced cytotoxicity remains elusive.

=== Cancer ===
Dysregulation of individual mEMC subunits correlates with the severity of certain types of cancer. Expression of hHSS1, a secreted splice variant of EMC10 (HSM1), reduces the proliferation and migration of glioma cell lines.

Overexpression of EMC6 has been found to reduce cell proliferation of glioblastoma cells in vitro and in vivo, whereas its RNAi-mediated depletion has the opposite effect. This indicates that the mEMC assumes (an) important function(s) in cancerous cells to establish a malignant tumour.

=== Pathologies ===
Mutations in the EMC1 gene have been associated with retinal dystrophy and a severe systemic disease phenotype involving developmental delay, cerebellar atrophy, scoliosis and hypotonia.

Similarly, a homozygous missense mutation (c.430G>A, p.Ala144Thr) within the EMC1 gene has been correlated with the development of retinal dystrophy.

Even though a set of disease-causing mutations in EMC1 has been mapped, their effect on EMC1 function and structure remain to be studied.
