= Culex perfuscus =

Scientific classification
- Kingdom: Animalia
- Phylum: Arthropoda
- Class: Insecta
- Order: Diptera
- Family: Culicidae
- Genus: Culex
- Species: C. perfuscus

Binomial name
- Culex perfuscus Edwards, 1914

Species of mosquito

Culex perfuscus is the only Culex species mosquito currently implicated as a possible vector of Zika virus. The species type was described in 1914 from Port Herald, Nyasaland by entomologist Frederick Wallace Edwards.

== Bionomics ==
Culex perfuscus have been collected in a variety of sites in forest habitat, including springs containing green algae, foul pools, shaded residual pools, the bed of a temporary stream, the edge of a slow-flowing river, and water in the bottom of an old canoe.

Culex perfuscus occurs in Benin, Burkina Faso, Cameroon, Central African Republic, Côte d'Ivoire, Democratic Republic of the Congo (Zaire), Ethiopia, Gabon, Ghana, Kenya, Liberia, Madagascar (including Glorioso and Juan de Nova islands), Malawi, Mali, Mauritania, Mozambique, Nigeria, Senegal, Sierra Leone, South Africa, Sudan and South Sudan, and Uganda.

== Medical importance ==
Zika virus has been detected in Culex perfuscus, although at a very low level, and no ability to transmit it was documented.
