= Aedes furcifer =

Scientific classification
- Kingdom: Animalia
- Phylum: Arthropoda
- Class: Insecta
- Order: Diptera
- Family: Culicidae
- Genus: Aedes
- Subgenus: Diceromyia
- Species: A. furcifer

Binomial name
- Aedes furcifer Edwards, 1913

Species of mosquito

Aedes furcifer was named in 1913 as a nomen novum for nigra (Theobald). Aedes furcifer and Aedes taylori have been treated as two species, usually found sympatrically, but are difficult to separate morphologically so the term "Aedes furcifer-taylori group" has been used for the two species, and they have not always been differentiated by workers conducting studies on them.

Aedes furcifer is the type species for the Aedes (Diceromyia) furcifer group in the Afrotropical realm, comprising three species: Aedes furcifer (Edwards), Aedes taylori (Edwards), and Aedes cordellieri (Huang). Immature and adult female Ae. furcifer sensu stricto and Ae. cordellieri are indistinguishable morphologically, with differences in the male gonocoxite being the only characteristic useful in separating the taxa.

== Bionomics ==
Aedes furcifer is a "tree hole mosquito", i.e., its subadult stages develop in rot-holes in trees. The species has been found in Burkina Faso, Ethiopia, Gambia, Ghana, Guinea Bissau, Ivory Coast, Kenya, Nigeria, Senegal, South Africa, Sudan, Tanzania, Togo, and Uganda.

== Medical importance ==
Yellow fever, chikungunya, Zika, Bouboui and Bunyamwera viruses have been isolated from members of the furcifer group. Ae. furcifer is involved in monkey-to-man and man-to-man transmission of yellow fever, is a potential vector of dengue virus serotype 2, and is a vector of chikungunya virus.

Aedes furcifer feeds readily on monkeys and humans and has been observed to enter villages to feed on humans so is considered to be an important bridge vector between sylvatic and human populations.
