= PSME1 =

Protein found in humans

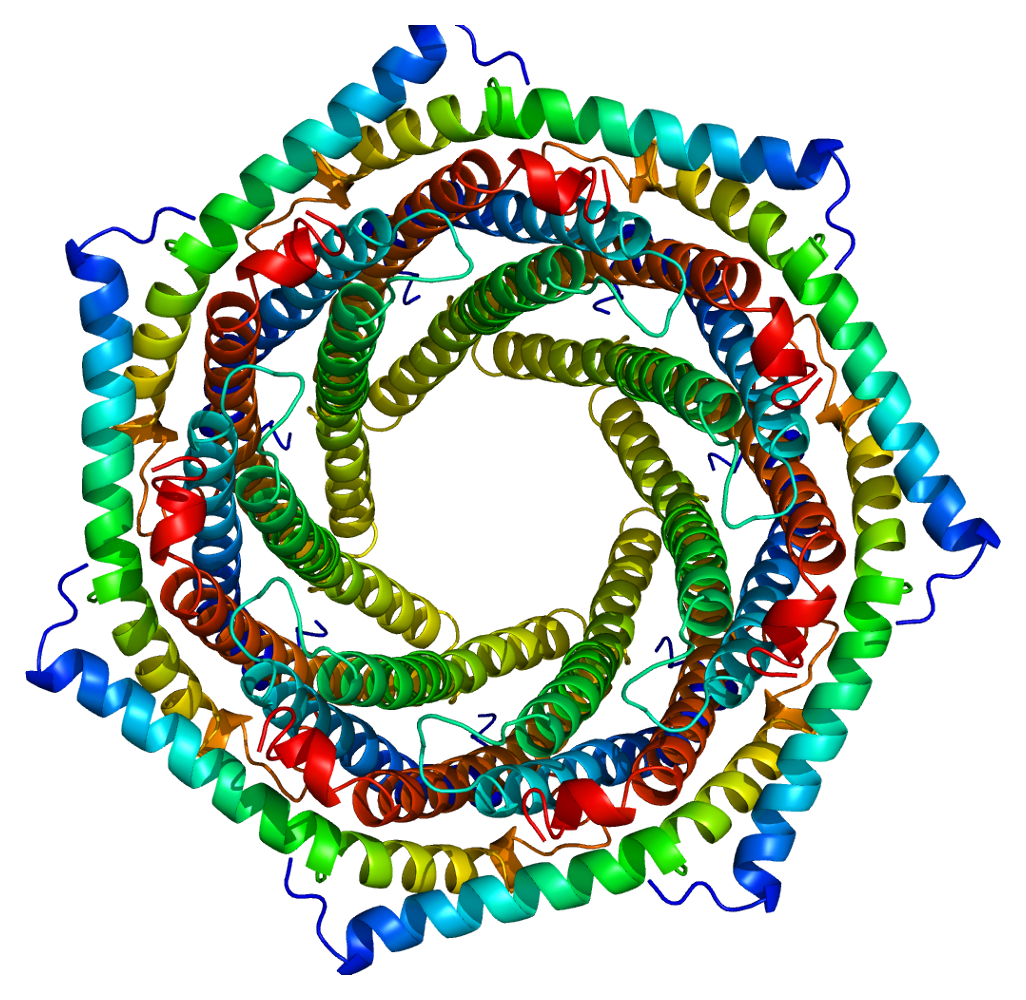

Identifiers
- Aliases: PSME1, IFI5111, PA28A, PA28alpha, REGalpha, HEL-S-129m, proteasome activator subunit 1
- External IDs: OMIM: 600654; MGI: 1096367; GeneCards: PSME1
Available structures
PDB	Ortholog search: PDBe RCSB
PDB	List of PDB id codes 1AVO

Gene location (Human)
Chr.	Chromosome 14 (human)
Band	14q12	Start	24,136,163 bp
Band	14q12	End	24,138,967 bp

Gene location (Mouse)
Chr.	Chromosome 14 (mouse)
Band	14 C3|14 28.19 cM	Start	55,815,580 bp
Band	14 C3|14 28.19 cM	End	55,818,986 bp
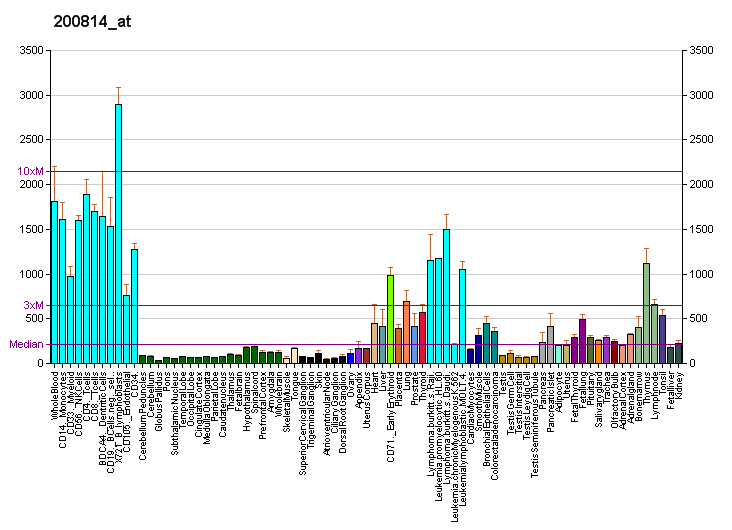
RNA expression pattern
Bgee	Human / Mouse (ortholog); Top expressed in: granulocyte; monocyte; lymph node; spleen; right adrenal gland; duodenum; right adrenal cortex; appendix; left adrenal gland; rectum / Top expressed in: spleen; mesenteric lymph nodes; duodenum; right ventricle; thymus; right lung lobe; jejunum; blood; left lung; subcutaneous adipose tissue; More reference expression data
BioGPS	More reference expression data
Gene ontology
Molecular function	endopeptidase activator activity; protein binding
Cellular component	proteasome complex; cytoplasm; nucleoplasm; proteasome activator complex; cytosol; extracellular exosome
Biological process	tumor necrosis factor-mediated signaling pathway; protein polyubiquitination; T cell receptor signaling pathway; positive regulation of canonical Wnt signaling pathway; anaphase-promoting complex-dependent catabolic process; regulation of proteasomal protein catabolic process; regulation of G1/S transition of mitotic cell cycle; regulation of mRNA stability; antigen processing and presentation of exogenous peptide antigen via MHC class I, TAP-dependent; antigen processing and presentation of exogenous antigen; regulation of cellular amino acid metabolic process; NIK/NF-kappaB signaling; Fc-epsilon receptor signaling pathway; negative regulation of canonical Wnt signaling pathway; MAPK cascade; stimulatory C-type lectin receptor signaling pathway; positive regulation of endopeptidase activity; proteasome-mediated ubiquitin-dependent protein catabolic process; Wnt signaling pathway, planar cell polarity pathway; negative regulation of G2/M transition of mitotic cell cycle; protein deubiquitination; SCF-dependent proteasomal ubiquitin-dependent protein catabolic process; transmembrane transport; regulation of transcription from RNA polymerase II promoter in response to hypoxia; post-translational protein modification; regulation of hematopoietic stem cell differentiation; interleukin-1-mediated signaling pathway; regulation of mitotic cell cycle phase transition
Sources:Amigo / QuickGO
Orthologs
Databases	NCBI: entry; OMA: entry
Species	Human	Mouse
Entrez	5720	19186
Ensembl	ENSG00000092010; ENSG00000284916	ENSMUSG00000022216
UniProt	Q06323	P97371
RefSeq (mRNA)	NM_176783; NM_001281528; NM_001281529; NM_006263	NM_011189
RefSeq (protein)	NP_001268457; NP_001268458; NP_006254; NP_788955	NP_035319
Location (UCSC)	Chr 14: 24.14 – 24.14 Mb	Chr 14: 55.82 – 55.82 Mb
PubMed search
- Wikidata
View/Edit Human	View/Edit Mouse

Proteasome activator complex subunit 1 is a protein that in humans is encoded by the PSME1 gene.

== Function ==
The 26S proteasome is a multicatalytic proteinase complex with a highly ordered structure composed of 2 complexes, a 20S core and a 19S regulator. The 20S core is composed of 4 rings of 28 non-identical subunits; 2 rings are composed of 7 alpha subunits and 2 rings are composed of 7 beta subunits. The 19S regulator is composed of a base, which contains 6 ATPase subunits and 2 non-ATPase subunits, and a lid, which contains up to 10 non-ATPase subunits. Proteasomes are distributed throughout eukaryotic cells at a high concentration and cleave peptides in an ATP/ubiquitin-dependent process in a non-lysosomal pathway. An essential function of a modified proteasome, the immunoproteasome, is the processing of class I MHC peptides. The immunoproteasome contains an alternate regulator, referred to as the 11S regulator or PA28, that replaces the 19S regulator. Three subunits (alpha, beta and gamma) of the 11S regulator have been identified. This gene encodes the alpha subunit of the 11S regulator, one of the two 11S subunits that is induced by gamma-interferon. Three alpha and three beta subunits combine to form a heterohexameric ring. Two transcripts encoding different isoforms have been identified.

== Interactions ==
PSME1 has been shown to interact with:

- Emerin and
- PSME2.
