= Methodist College =

Methodist College may refer to:

- Methodist University in North Carolina (formerly Methodist College)
- Methodist College of UnityPoint Health in Peoria, IL
- Nebraska Methodist College in Omaha, NE
- Methodist College (Kowloon) in Yau Ma Tei, Hong Kong
- Sha Tin Methodist College in Sha Tin, Hong Kong
- Methodist College Belfast
- Southern Methodist University
- Methodist College, Colombo, in Sri Lanka
- Methodist Girls' High School, Point Pedro, in Sri Lanka
- Methodist College Kuala Lumpur in Brickfields, Kuala Lumpur, the capital of Malaysia

== See also ==
- International Association of Methodist-related Schools, Colleges, and Universities
