= PSME2 =

Protein found in humans

Identifiers
- Aliases: PSME2, PA28B, PA28beta, REGbeta, proteasome activator subunit 2
- External IDs: OMIM: 602161; MGI: 1096365; GeneCards: PSME2

Gene location (Human)
Chr.	Chromosome 14 (human)
Band	14q12	Start	24,143,362 bp
Band	14q12	End	24,147,570 bp

Gene location (Mouse)
Chr.	Chromosome 14 (mouse)
Band	14 C3|14 28.19 cM	Start	55,824,898 bp
Band	14 C3|14 28.19 cM	End	55,828,570 bp
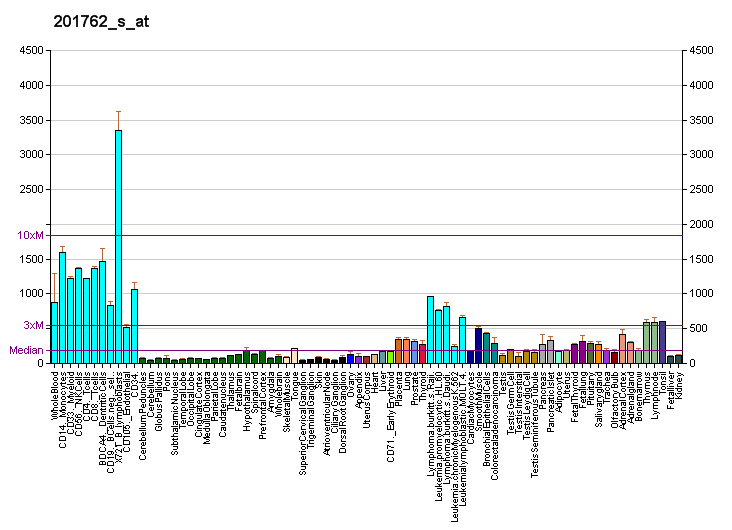
RNA expression pattern
Bgee	Human / Mouse (ortholog); Top expressed in: granulocyte; duodenum; appendix; spleen; right adrenal cortex; mucosa of transverse colon; lymph node; pituitary gland; left adrenal gland; left adrenal cortex / Top expressed in: jejunum; duodenum; ileum; colon; adrenal gland; ovary; uterus; epiblast; spleen; white adipose tissue; More reference expression data
BioGPS	More reference expression data
Gene ontology
Molecular function	endopeptidase activator activity; protein binding; identical protein binding
Cellular component	cytoplasm; cytosol; membrane; proteasome activator complex; nucleoplasm; proteasome complex; extracellular exosome
Biological process	positive regulation of endopeptidase activity; regulation of proteasomal protein catabolic process; regulation of cellular amino acid metabolic process; antigen processing and presentation of exogenous peptide antigen via MHC class I, TAP-dependent; regulation of mRNA stability; positive regulation of canonical Wnt signaling pathway; protein polyubiquitination; stimulatory C-type lectin receptor signaling pathway; tumor necrosis factor-mediated signaling pathway; MAPK cascade; Fc-epsilon receptor signaling pathway; regulation of G1/S transition of mitotic cell cycle; NIK/NF-kappaB signaling; anaphase-promoting complex-dependent catabolic process; T cell receptor signaling pathway; negative regulation of canonical Wnt signaling pathway; proteasome-mediated ubiquitin-dependent protein catabolic process; Wnt signaling pathway, planar cell polarity pathway; negative regulation of G2/M transition of mitotic cell cycle; protein deubiquitination; SCF-dependent proteasomal ubiquitin-dependent protein catabolic process; transmembrane transport; regulation of transcription from RNA polymerase II promoter in response to hypoxia; post-translational protein modification; interleukin-12-mediated signaling pathway; regulation of hematopoietic stem cell differentiation; interleukin-1-mediated signaling pathway; regulation of mitotic cell cycle phase transition
Sources:Amigo / QuickGO
Orthologs
Databases	NCBI: entry; OMA: entry
Species	Human	Mouse
Entrez	5721	19188
Ensembl	ENSG00000100911; ENSG00000284889	ENSMUSG00000079197
UniProt	Q9UL46	P97372
RefSeq (mRNA)	NM_002818	NM_001029855; NM_011190
RefSeq (protein)	NP_002809	NP_001268401
Location (UCSC)	Chr 14: 24.14 – 24.15 Mb	Chr 14: 55.82 – 55.83 Mb
PubMed search
- Wikidata
View/Edit Human	View/Edit Mouse

Proteasome activator complex subunit 2 is a protein that in humans is encoded by the PSME2 gene.

== Function ==
The 26S proteasome is a multicatalytic proteinase complex with a highly ordered structure composed of 2 complexes, a 20S core and a 19S regulator. The 20S core is composed of 4 rings of 28 non-identical subunits; 2 rings are composed of 7 alpha subunits and 2 rings are composed of 7 beta subunits. The 19S regulator is composed of a base, which contains 6 ATPase subunits and 2 non-ATPase subunits, and a lid, which contains up to 10 non-ATPase subunits. Proteasomes are distributed throughout eukaryotic cells at a high concentration and cleave peptides in an ATP/ubiquitin-dependent process in a non-lysosomal pathway. An essential function of a modified proteasome, the immunoproteasome, is the processing of class I MHC peptides. The immunoproteasome contains an alternate regulator, referred to as the 11S regulator or PA28, that replaces the 19S regulator. Three subunits (alpha, beta and gamma) of the 11S regulator have been identified. This gene encodes the beta subunit of the 11S regulator, one of the two 11S subunits that is induced by gamma-interferon. Three beta and three alpha subunits combine to form a heterohexameric ring. Six pseudogenes have been identified on chromosomes 4, 5, 8, 10 and 13.

== Interactions ==
PSME2 has been shown to interact with PSME1.
