= RNF31 =

Protein-coding gene in the species Homo sapiens

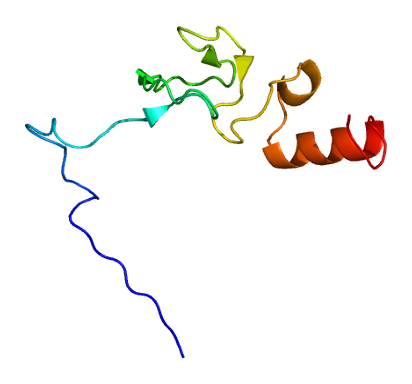

Identifiers
- Aliases: RNF31, HOIP, ZIBRA, ring finger protein 31, Paul
- External IDs: OMIM: 612487; MGI: 1934704; GeneCards: RNF31
Available structures
PDB	Ortholog search: PDBe RCSB
PDB	List of PDB id codes 2CT7, 4DBG, 4JUY, 4LJO, 4LJP, 4LJQ, 4OWF, 4OYJ, 4OYK, 4P09, 4P0A, 4P0B, 5EDV
Enzyme activity
EC #	BRENDA	ExPASy	KEGG	MetaCyc
2.3.2.31	↗	↗	↗	↗

Gene location (Human)
Chr.	Chromosome 14 (human)
Band	14q12	Start	24,146,683 bp
Band	14q12	End	24,160,660 bp

Gene location (Mouse)
Chr.	Chromosome 14 (mouse)
Band	14|14 C3	Start	55,829,165 bp
Band	14|14 C3	End	55,841,150 bp
RNA expression pattern
Bgee	Human / Mouse (ortholog); Top expressed in: spleen; granulocyte; apex of heart; blood; muscle of thigh; right lobe of thyroid gland; anterior pituitary; body of pancreas; left lobe of thyroid gland; right ovary / Top expressed in: granulocyte; neural layer of retina; internal carotid artery; mesenteric lymph nodes; muscle of thigh; yolk sac; duodenum; jejunum; thymus; superior frontal gyrus; More reference expression data
BioGPS	n/a
Gene ontology
Molecular function	metal ion binding; ubiquitin-protein transferase activity; ubiquitin binding; protein binding; ubiquitin protein ligase binding; transferase activity
Cellular component	cytoplasm; cytosol; LUBAC complex; CD40 receptor complex; cytoplasmic side of plasma membrane
Biological process	positive regulation of protein targeting to mitochondrion; CD40 signaling pathway; regulation of tumor necrosis factor-mediated signaling pathway; protein polyubiquitination; positive regulation of NF-kappaB transcription factor activity; positive regulation of I-kappaB kinase/NF-kappaB signaling; I-kappaB kinase/NF-kappaB signaling; T cell receptor signaling pathway; protein linear polyubiquitination; protein ubiquitination
Sources:Amigo / QuickGO
Orthologs
Databases	NCBI: entry; OMA: entry
Species	Human	Mouse
Entrez	55072	268749
Ensembl	ENSG00000092098; ENSG00000285152	ENSMUSG00000047098
UniProt	Q96EP0	Q924T7
RefSeq (mRNA)	NM_017999; NM_001310332	NM_194346
RefSeq (protein)	NP_001297261; NP_060469	NP_919327
Location (UCSC)	Chr 14: 24.15 – 24.16 Mb	Chr 14: 55.83 – 55.84 Mb
PubMed search
- Wikidata
View/Edit Human	View/Edit Mouse

RING finger protein 31 is a protein that in humans is encoded by the RNF31 gene.

The protein encoded by this gene contains a RING finger, a motif present in a variety of functionally distinct proteins and known to be involved in protein-DNA and protein-protein interactions.

== See also ==
- RING finger domain
