= TTC35 =

Protein-coding gene in the species Homo sapiens

EMC2

Identifiers
- Aliases: EMC2, KIAA0103, TTC35, ER membrane protein complex subunit 2
- External IDs: OMIM: 607722; MGI: 1913986; GeneCards: EMC2

Gene location (Human)
Chr.	Chromosome 8 (human)
Band	8q23.1	Start	108,443,601 bp
Band	8q23.1	End	108,489,196 bp

Gene location (Mouse)
Chr.	Chromosome 15 (mouse)
Band	15|15 B3.2	Start	43,340,625 bp
Band	15|15 B3.2	End	43,391,159 bp
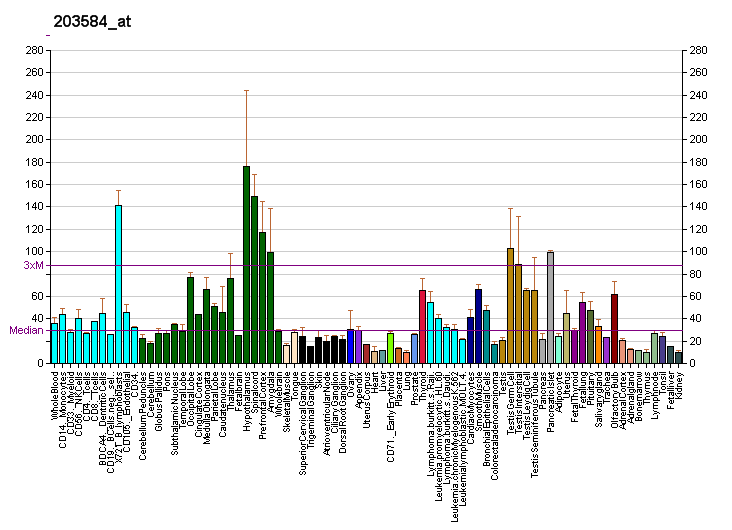
RNA expression pattern
Bgee	Human / Mouse (ortholog); Top expressed in: Achilles tendon; C1 segment; corpus callosum; sperm; Descending thoracic aorta; muscle of thigh; right coronary artery; body of pancreas; right auricle of heart; tibial arteries / Top expressed in: intercostal muscle; Epithelium of choroid plexus; stroma of bone marrow; digastric muscle; facial motor nucleus; vastus lateralis muscle; sternocleidomastoid muscle; myocardium of ventricle; triceps brachii muscle; temporal muscle; More reference expression data
BioGPS	More reference expression data
Gene ontology
Molecular function	protein binding
Cellular component	cytoplasm; EMC complex; endoplasmic reticulum; nucleus
Biological process	protein folding in endoplasmic reticulum
Sources:Amigo / QuickGO
Orthologs
Databases	NCBI: entry; OMA: entry
Species	Human	Mouse
Entrez	9694	66736
Ensembl	ENSG00000104412	ENSMUSG00000022337
UniProt	Q15006	Q9CRD2
RefSeq (mRNA)	NM_001329493; NM_001329494; NM_001329495; NM_014673	NM_025736
RefSeq (protein)	NP_001316422; NP_001316423; NP_001316424; NP_055488	NP_080012
Location (UCSC)	Chr 8: 108.44 – 108.49 Mb	Chr 15: 43.34 – 43.39 Mb
PubMed search
- Wikidata
View/Edit Human	View/Edit Mouse

ER membrane protein complex subunit 2 is a protein that in humans is encoded by the gene EMC2 (previously TTC35).

== See also ==
- ER membrane protein complex
