= European Monitoring Centre on Change =

The European Monitoring Centre on Change (EMCC) is "a place for exchanging practice, information and ideas on the management and anticipation of change," consisting primarily of an informational website. It was founded at a 2001 conference on "What drives change?", which was organized by the European Foundation for the Improvement of Living and Working Conditions. The EMCC continues to be maintained by that Foundation.

== History ==
The EMCC was one of the remedies proposed by the European Commission in its June, 2000 "Social Policy Agenda."
