= Hematospermia =

Presence of blood in ejaculation

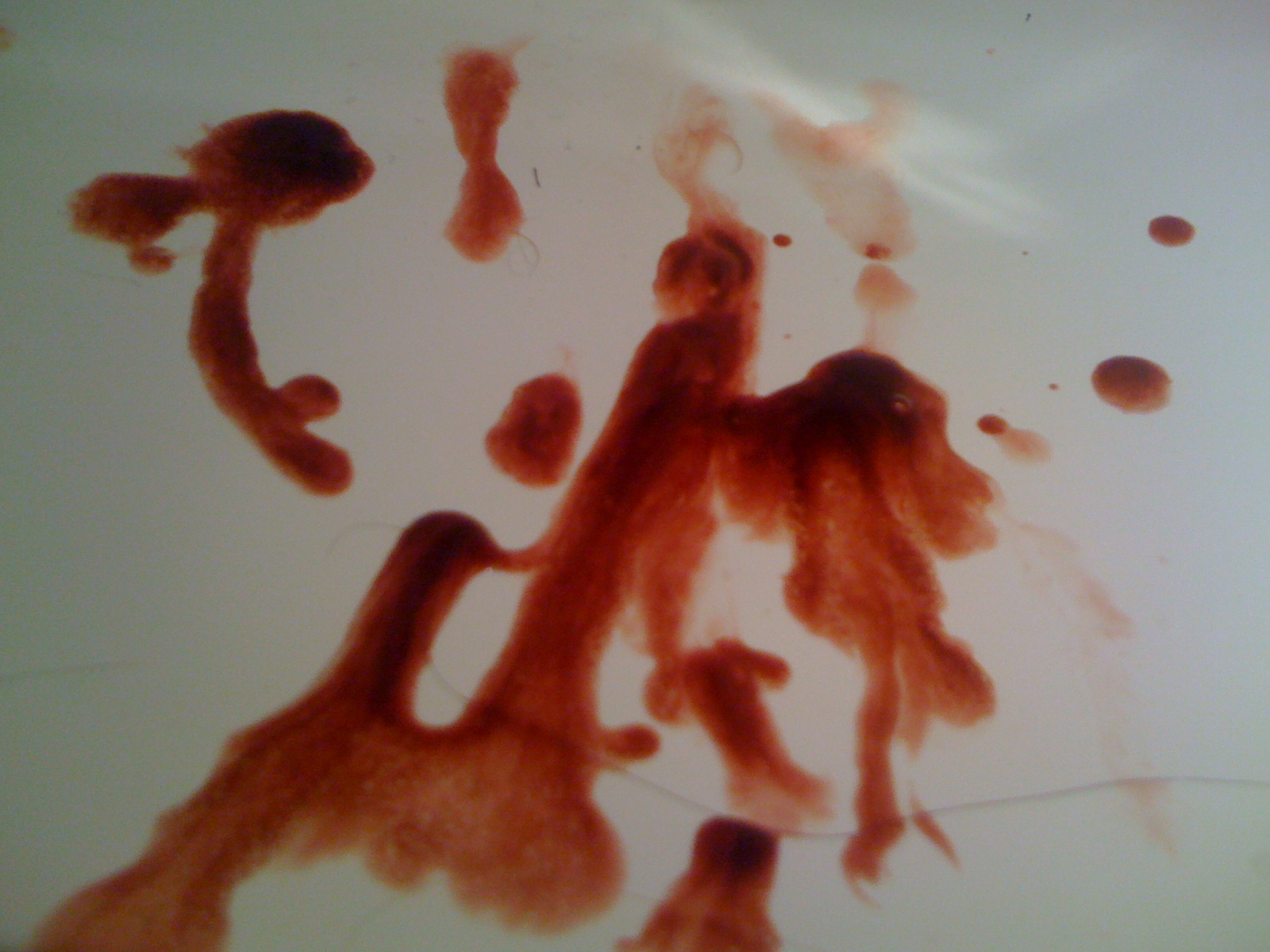
- The ejaculatory output of a man with severe hematospermia
- Specialty: Urology

Hematospermia (also known as haematospermia, hemospermia, or haemospermia) is the presence of blood in the ejaculate. It is most often a benign symptom. Among men age 40 or older, hematospermia is a slight predictor of cancer, typically prostate cancer. No specific cause is found in up to 70% of cases.

== Cause ==
Though haematospermia may cause considerable distress to patients, it is often a benign and self-limiting condition caused by infections, particularly in younger patients. An isolated episode is usually considered benign and not likely to be associated with malignancy. Recurrent haematospermia may indicate a more serious underlying pathology particularly in patients over 40 years of age.

=== Infection and inflammation ===
Infection or inflammation is considered the most common cause of the condition. Implicated pathogens include; Gram-negative bacteria (often E. coli), gonococci, Treponema pallidum, Chlamydia trachomatis, Neisseria gonorrhoeae, echinococcus (rarely), HSV type 1 or 2, and HPV. The condition may also rarely be caused by some chronic systemic infections like tuberculosis or schistosomiasis. Additionally, testicular, prostate, and epididymal inflammation in general may present with haematospermia as feature.

=== Neoplasm ===
Some neoplasms of the genitourinary system may present with haematospermia. Malignant causes of haematospermia include; prostate cancer, testicular or epididymal tumours, seminal vesicle carcinoma (rarely), and urethral tumour. Lymphomas and leukaemias may also feature haematospermia as symptom.

=== Prostate ===
Various prostate pathologies (including prostatitis, calculi (stones), cysts, benign prostatic hyperplasia, bacterial infection, etc.) may result in blood occurring in the ejaculate.

=== Other ===
Systemic conditions like malignant hypertension, liver dysfunction, or bleeding disorders, and amyloidosis may sometimes be present with hematospermia as symptom. Trauma to the region may also cause the condition. Additionally, structural anomalies of genitourinary anatomy (e.g. vascular anomalies, polyps, urethral malformations, etc.) may result in hematospermia as symptom.

Excessive sex or masturbation, prolonged sexual abstinence, interrupted sex, and certain sexual behaviours may also result in (mostly isolated events of) hematospermia.

=== Unknown ===
The exact cause cannot be determined in up to 70% of patients.

== Diagnosis ==
The main focus of an evaluation should be to determine its cause (if possible) and rule out infection and malignancy. It is important to rule out pseudo-haematospermia where blood originates from the partner during intercourse.

== Epidemiology ==
Though the exact incidence is unknown, haematospermia has been reported in one per 5,000 patients in initial examinations at urological out-patient clinics. Most patients are between 30–40 years of age. It is thought to make up ~1% of all urological symptoms.

== History ==
Traditionally, the condition was thought to be a clinically insignificant consequence of prolonged sexual abstinence or intense sexual experiences.
