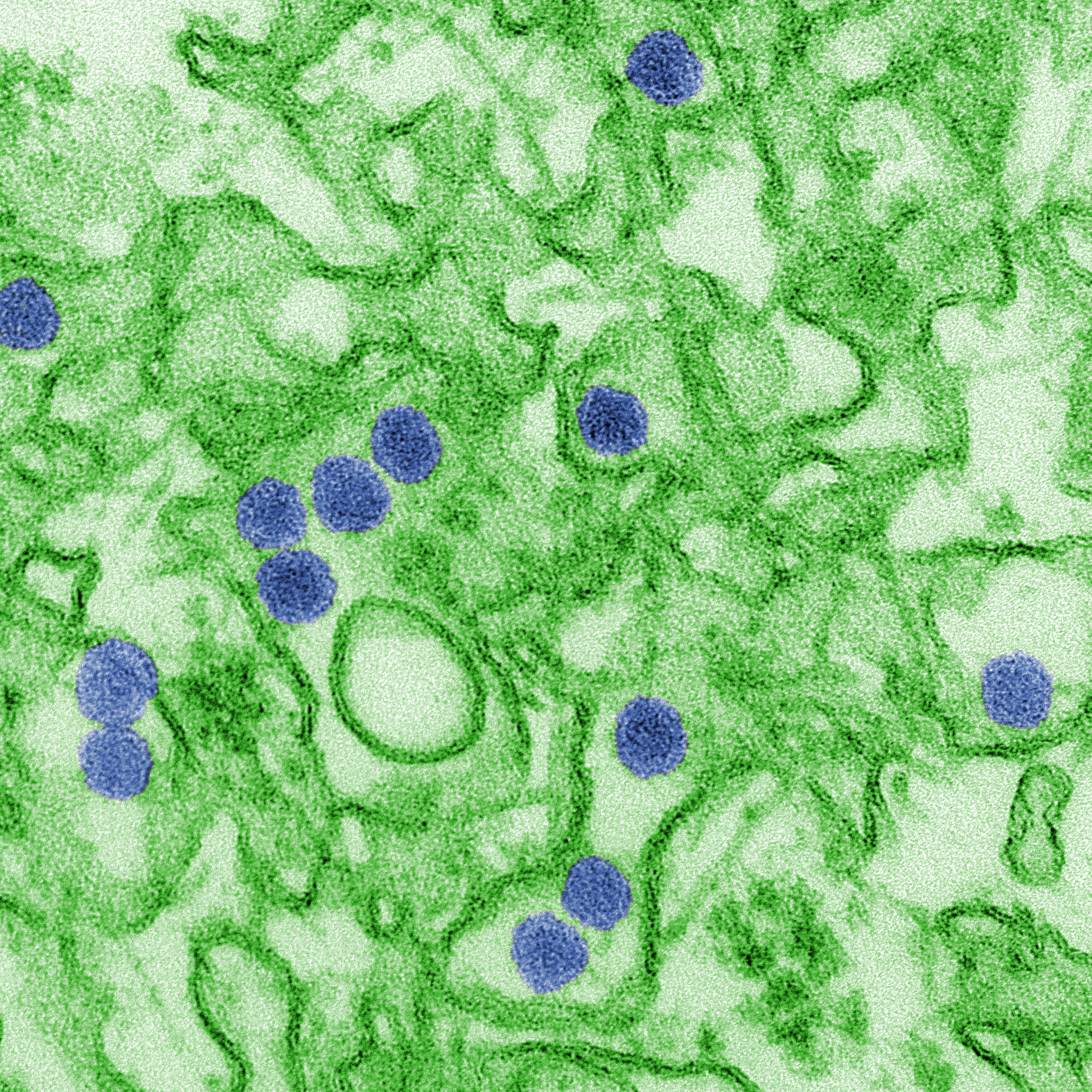
- Electron micrograph of Zika virus. Virus particles (digitally colored purple) are 40 nm in diameter, with an outer envelope and a dense inner core.
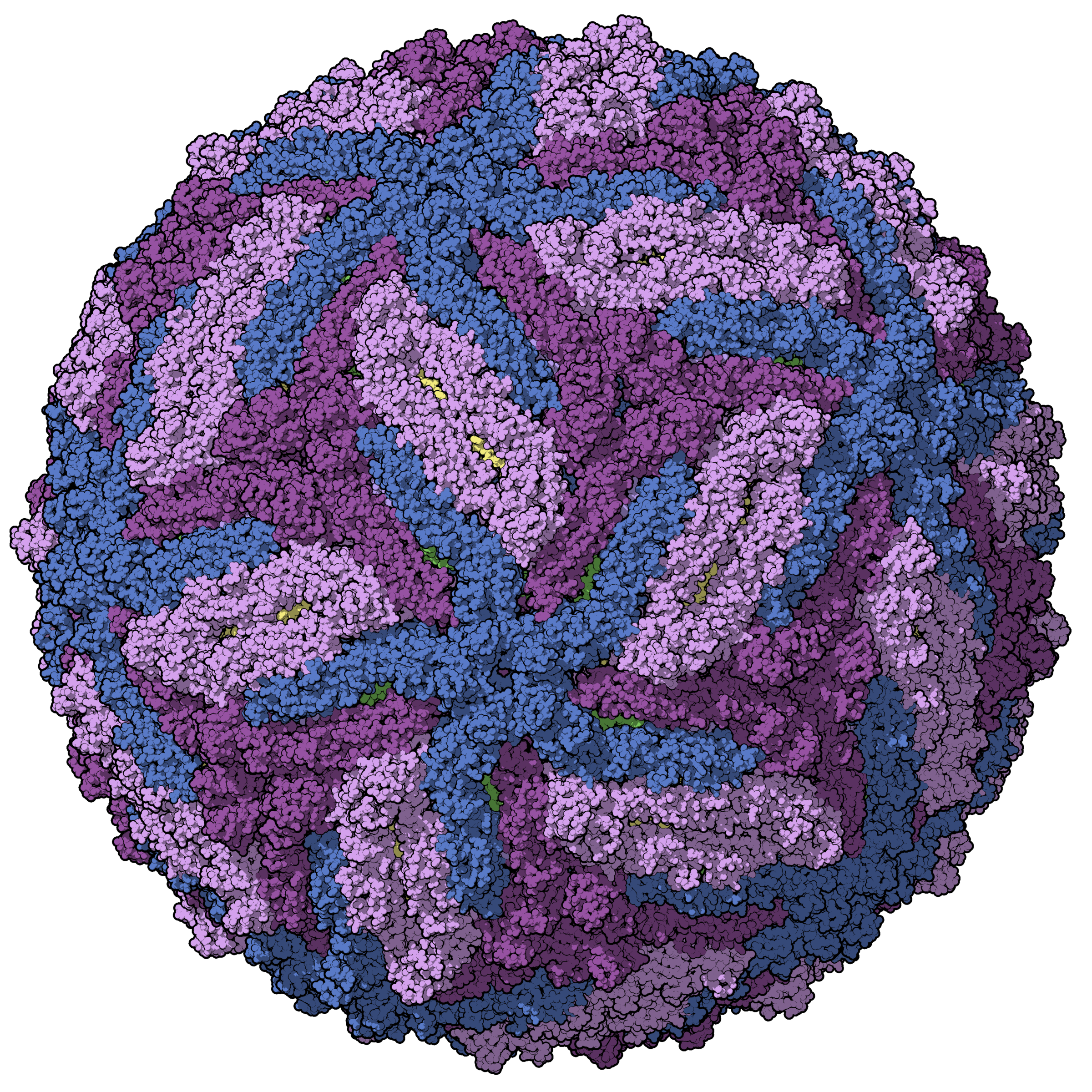
- Zika virus viral envelope model, colored by chains, PDB entry 5ire

Virus classification
- (unranked): Virus
- Realm: Riboviria
- Kingdom: Orthornavirae
- Phylum: Kitrinoviricota
- Class: Flasuviricetes
- Order: Amarillovirales
- Family: Flaviviridae
- Genus: Orthoflavivirus
- Subgenus: Euflavivirus
- Species: Orthoflavivirus zikaense

= Zika virus =

Species of flavivirus

Zika virus (ZIKV; pronounced /ˈziːkə/ or /ˈzɪkə/) is an arbovirus which is a member of the virus family Flaviviridae. It is spread by daytime-active Aedes mosquitoes, such as A. aegypti and A. albopictus. Its name comes from the Ziika Forest of Uganda, where the virus was first isolated in 1947. Zika virus shares a genus with the dengue, yellow fever, Japanese encephalitis, and West Nile viruses. Since the 1950s, it has been known to occur within a narrow equatorial belt. From 2007 to 2016, the virus spread eastward from Oceania across the Pacific Ocean to the Americas, leading to the 2015–2016 Zika virus epidemic.

The infection, known as Zika fever or Zika virus disease, often causes no or only mild symptoms, similar to a very mild form of dengue fever. There is no treatment for the disease as of 2025, but paracetamol (acetaminophen) and rest may help with the symptoms. As of April 2019, no vaccines have been approved for clinical use, however a number of vaccines are currently in clinical trials. Zika can spread from a pregnant woman to her baby. This can result in microcephaly, severe brain malformations, and other birth defects. Zika infections in adults may rarely cause Guillain–Barré syndrome.

In January 2016, the United States Centers for Disease Control and Prevention (CDC) issued travel guidance on affected countries, including the use of enhanced precautions, and guidelines for pregnant women including considering postponing travel. Other governments or health agencies also issued similar travel warnings, while Colombia, the Dominican Republic, Puerto Rico, Ecuador, El Salvador, and Jamaica advised women to postpone becoming pregnant until more is known about the risks.

== Virology ==
Zika virus belongs to the family Flaviviridae and the genus Flavivirus, thus is related to the dengue, yellow fever, Japanese encephalitis, and West Nile viruses. Like other flaviviruses, Zika virus is enveloped and icosahedral and has a nonsegmented, single-stranded, 10 kilobase, positive-sense RNA genome. It is most closely related to the Spondweni virus and is one of the two known viruses in the Spondweni virus clade.

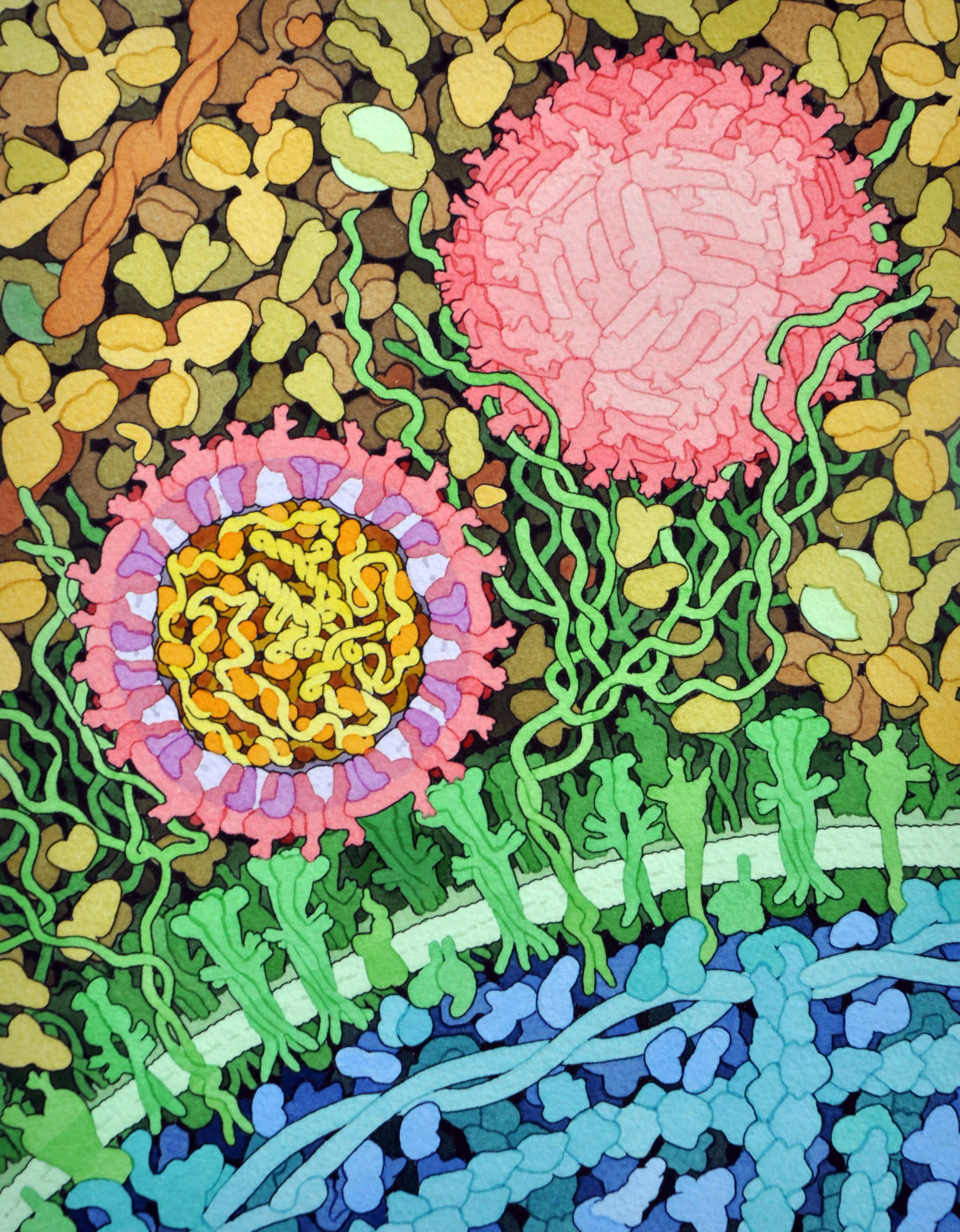
Cross-section of Zika virus, showing the viral envelope composed of envelope proteins (red) and membrane proteins (purple) embedded in the lipid membrane (white): The capsid proteins (orange) are shown interacting with the RNA genome (yellow) at the center of the virus.

A positive-sense RNA genome can be directly translated into viral proteins. As in other flaviviruses, such as the similarly sized West Nile virus, the RNA genome encodes seven nonstructural proteins and three structural proteins in the form of a single polyprotein (Q32ZE1). One of the structural proteins encapsulates the virus. This protein is the flavivirus envelope glycoprotein, that binds to the endosomal membrane of the host cell to initiate endocytosis. The RNA genome forms a nucleocapsid along with copies of the 12-kDa capsid protein. The nucleocapsid, in turn, is enveloped within a host-derived membrane modified with two viral glycoproteins. Viral genome replication depends on the making of double-stranded RNA from the single-stranded, positive-sense RNA (ssRNA(+)) genome followed by transcription and replication to provide viral mRNAs and new ssRNA(+) genomes.

A longitudinal study shows that 6 hours after cells are infected with Zika virus, the vacuoles and mitochondria in the cells begin to swell. This swelling becomes so severe, it results in cell death, also known as paraptosis. This form of programmed cell death requires gene expression. IFITM3 is a trans-membrane protein in a cell that is able to protect it from viral infection by blocking virus attachment. Cells are most susceptible to Zika infection when levels of IFITM3 are low. Once the cell has been infected, the virus restructures the endoplasmic reticulum, forming the large vacuoles, resulting in cell death.

There are two Zika lineages: the African lineage and the Asian lineage. Phylogenetic studies indicate that the virus spreading in the Americas is 89% identical to African genotypes, but is most closely related to the Asian strain that circulated in French Polynesia during the 2013–2014 outbreak.

The Asian strain appears to have first evolved around 1928.

== Transmission ==
The vertebrate hosts of the virus were primarily monkeys in a so-called enzootic mosquito-monkey-mosquito cycle, with only occasional transmission to humans. Before 2007, Zika "rarely caused recognized 'spillover' infections in humans, even in highly enzootic areas". Infrequently, however, other arboviruses have become established as a human disease and spread in a mosquito–human–mosquito cycle, like the yellow fever virus and the dengue fever virus (both flaviviruses), and the chikungunya virus (a togavirus). Though the reason for the pandemic is unknown, dengue, a related arbovirus that infects the same species of mosquito vectors, is known in particular to be intensified by urbanization and globalization. Zika is primarily spread by Aedes aegypti mosquitoes, and can also be transmitted through sexual contact or blood transfusions. The basic reproduction number (R_{0}, a measure of transmissibility) of Zika virus has been estimated to be between 1.4 and 6.6 .

In 2015, news reports drew attention to the rapid spread of Zika in Latin America and the Caribbean. At that time, the Pan American Health Organization published a list of countries and territories that experienced "local Zika virus transmission" comprising Barbados, Bolivia, Brazil, Colombia, the Dominican Republic, Ecuador, El Salvador, French Guiana, Guadeloupe, Guatemala, Guyana, Haiti, Honduras, Martinique, Mexico, Panama, Paraguay, Puerto Rico, Saint Martin, Suriname, and Venezuela. By August 2016, more than 50 countries had experienced active (local) transmission of Zika virus.

=== Mosquito ===
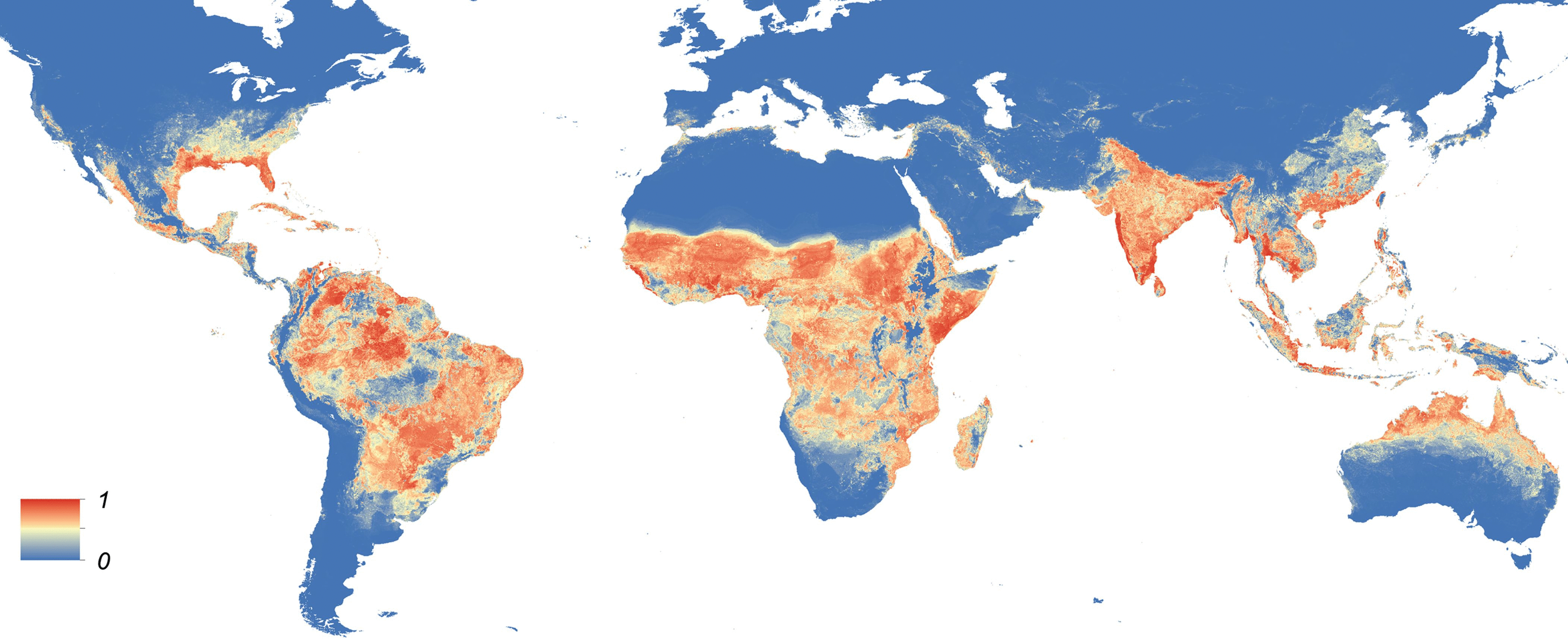
Global Aedes aegypti predicted distribution in 2015. The map depicts the probability of occurrence (blue=none, red=highest occurrence).

Zika is primarily spread by the female Aedes aegypti mosquito, which is active mostly in the daytime. The mosquitos must feed on blood to lay eggs. The virus has also been isolated from a number of arboreal mosquito species in the genus Aedes, such as A. africanus, A. apicoargenteus, A. furcifer, A. hensilli, A. luteocephalus, and A. vittatus, with an extrinsic incubation period in mosquitoes around 10 days.

Zika has been detected in many more species of Aedes, along with Anopheles coustani, Mansonia uniformis, and Culex perfuscus, although this alone does not incriminate them as vectors. To detect the presence of the virus usually requires genetic material to be analysed in a lab using the technique RT-PCR. A much cheaper and faster method involves shining a light at the head and thorax of the mosquito, and detecting chemical compounds characteristic of the virus using near-infrared spectroscopy.

Transmission by A. albopictus, the tiger mosquito, was reported from a 2007 urban outbreak in Gabon, where it had newly invaded the country and become the primary vector for the concomitant chikungunya and dengue virus outbreaks. New outbreaks can occur if a person carrying the virus travels to another region where A. albopictus is common.

The potential societal risk of Zika can be delimited by the distribution of the mosquito species that transmit it. The global distribution of the most cited carrier of Zika, A. aegypti, is expanding due to global trade and travel. A. aegypti distribution is now the most extensive ever recorded – on parts of all continents except Antarctica, including North America and even the European periphery (Madeira, the Netherlands, and the northeastern Black Sea coast). A mosquito population capable of carrying Zika has been found in a Capitol Hill neighborhood of Washington, DC, and genetic evidence suggests they survived at least four consecutive winters in the region. The study authors conclude that mosquitos are adapting for persistence in a northern climate. Zika virus appears to be contagious via mosquitoes for around a week after infection. The virus is thought to be infectious for a longer period of time after infection (at least 2 weeks) when transmitted via semen.

Research into its ecological niche suggests that Zika may be influenced to a greater degree by changes in precipitation and temperature than dengue, making it more likely to be confined to tropical areas. However, rising global temperatures due to climate change would allow for the disease vector to expand its range further north, allowing Zika to follow. It is predicted that climate change will expose more than 1.3 billion new people to Zika virus by 2050.

=== Sexual ===
Zika can be transmitted from men and women to their sexual partners; most known cases involve transmission from symptomatic men to women. As of 2016, sexual transmission of Zika had been documented in six countries – Argentina, Australia, France, Italy, New Zealand, and the United States – during the 2015 outbreak. ZIKV can persist in semen for several months, with viral RNA detected up to one year. The virus replicates in the human testis, where it infects several cell types including testicular macrophages, peritubular cells and germ cells, the spermatozoa precursors. Semen parameters can be altered in patients for several weeks post-symptoms onset, and spermatozoa can be infectious. Since October 2016, the CDC has advised men who have traveled to an area with Zika should use condoms or not have sex for at least six months after their return as the virus is still transmissible even if symptoms never develop.

=== Pregnancy ===
Zika virus can spread by vertical (or "mother-to-child") transmission, during pregnancy or at delivery. An infection during pregnancy has been linked to changes in neuronal development of the unborn child. Severe progressions of infection have been linked to the development of microcephaly in the unborn child, while mild infections potentially can lead to neurocognitive disorders later in life. Congenital brain abnormalities other than microcephaly have also been reported after a Zika outbreak. Studies in mice have suggested that maternal immunity to dengue virus may enhance fetal infection with Zika, worsen the microcephaly phenotype and/or enhance damage during pregnancy, but it is unknown whether this occurs in humans. It is also not known if the virus can pass through a mother's breast milk to the child.

=== Blood transfusion ===
As of April 2016, two cases of Zika transmission through blood transfusions have been reported globally, both from Brazil, after which the US Food and Drug Administration (FDA) recommended screening blood donors and deferring high-risk donors for 4 weeks. A potential risk had been suspected based on a blood-donor screening study during the French Polynesian Zika outbreak, in which 2.8% (42) of donors from November 2013 and February 2014 tested positive for Zika RNA and were all asymptomatic at the time of blood donation. Eleven of the positive donors reported symptoms of Zika fever after their donation, but only three of 34 samples grew in culture.

== Pathogenesis ==
Zika virus replicates in the mosquito's midgut epithelial cells and then its salivary gland cells. After 5–10 days, the virus can be found in the mosquito's saliva. If the mosquito's saliva is inoculated into human skin, the virus can infect epidermal keratinocytes, skin fibroblasts in the skin and the Langerhans cells. The pathogenesis of the virus is hypothesized to continue with a spread to lymph nodes and the bloodstream. Flaviviruses replicate in the cytoplasm, but Zika antigens have been found in infected cell nuclei.

The viral protein numbered NS4A may lead to small head size (microcephaly) because it disrupts brain growth by hijacking a pathway which regulates growth of new neurons. Specifically, Link et al. reported in 2019 that NS4A disrupted the asymmetric division of neuronal precursors by the third larval instar in Drosophila fruit flies, and that these defects could be suppressed by heterologous expression of human ANKLE2, which NS4A interacts with, or by reducing expression of the VRK1 homologue Bällchen or the LLGL1 homologue lethal (2) giant larvae. Additionally, in fruit flies, both NS4A and the neighboring NS4B restrict eye growth.

== Zika fever ==
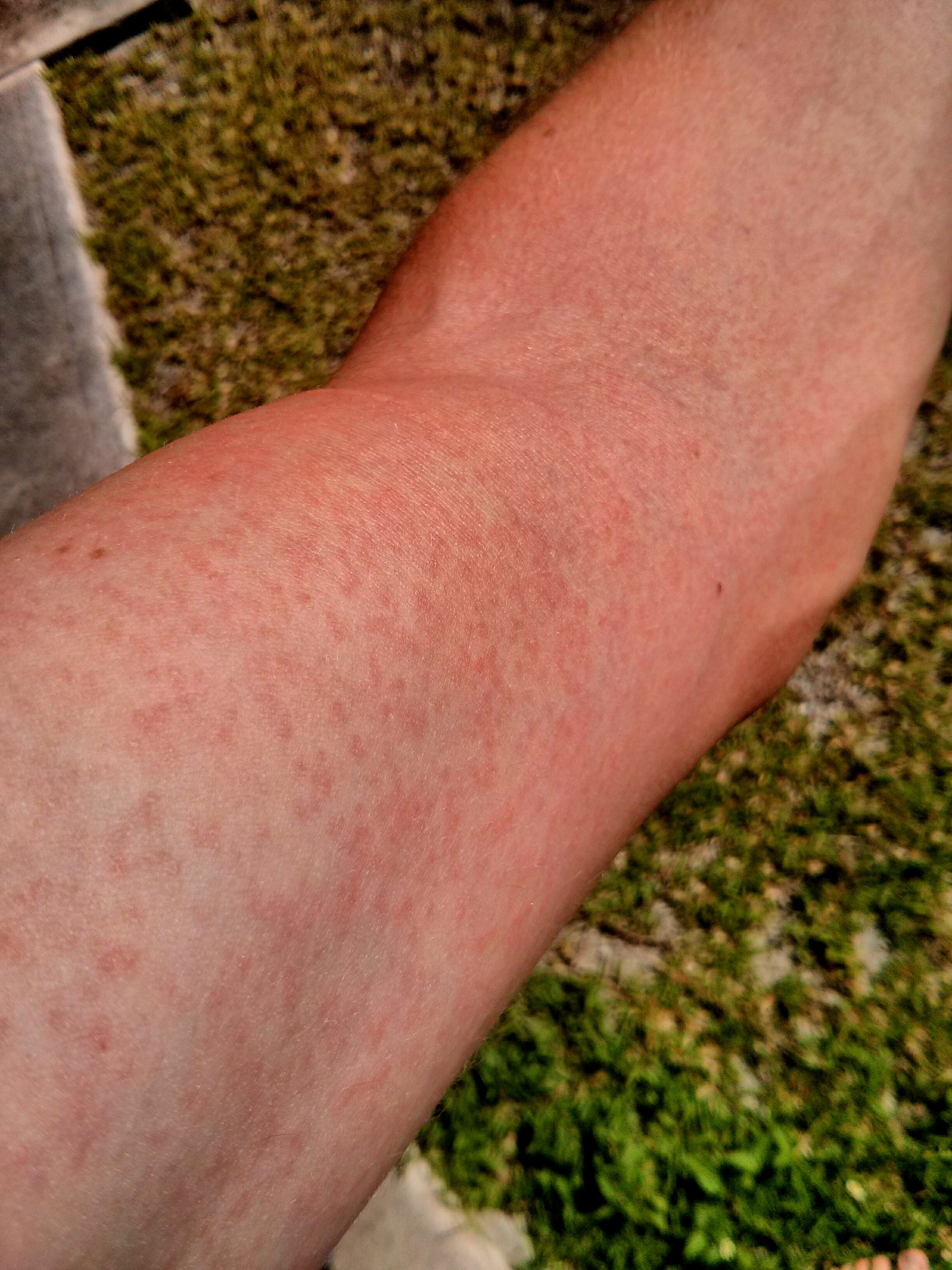
Rash on an arm due to Zika

Zika fever (also known as Zika virus disease) is an illness caused by Zika virus. Around 80% of cases are estimated to be asymptomatic, though the accuracy of this figure is hindered by the wide variance in data quality, and figures from different outbreaks can vary significantly. Symptomatic cases are usually mild and can resemble dengue fever. Symptoms may include fever, red eyes, joint pain, headache, and a maculopapular rash. Symptoms generally last less than seven days. It has not caused any reported deaths during the initial infection. Infection during pregnancy causes microcephaly and other brain malformations in some babies. Infection in adults has been linked to Guillain–Barré syndrome (GBS) and Zika virus has been shown to infect human Schwann cells.

=== Diagnosis ===
Diagnosis is by testing the blood, urine, or saliva for the presence of Zika virus RNA when the person is sick. In 2019, an improved diagnostic test, based on research from Washington University in St. Louis, that detects Zika infection in serum was granted market authorization by the FDA.

=== Prevention ===
Prevention involves decreasing mosquito bites in areas where the disease occurs, and proper use of condoms. This highlights the importance of sexual health education and safe sex practices in areas like these. Efforts to prevent bites include the use of DEET or picaridin - based insect repellent, covering much of the body with clothing, mosquito nets, and getting rid of standing water where mosquitoes reproduce. As of 2025 there is no vaccine. Health officials recommended that women in areas affected by the 2015–2016 Zika outbreak consider putting off pregnancy and that pregnant women not travel to these areas. Although unavailable to people of impoverished areas, using house screens, air-conditioning and removing yard/house debris help with prevention.

==== Genetically modified mosquitoes ====
There has been an innovation of genetically modified Ae. aegypti mosquitoes containing an anti-Zika virus transgene. This transgene contains a group of small synthethic RNAs that are used to target the genome of Zika virus. The use of this modification has been found to reduce viral infection, dissemination and also transmission rates of this virus. There have been trials conducted using these mosquitoes in countries like the Cayman Islands, Malaysia and Brazil. A company called Oxitec Ltd, which genetically engineered this mosquito, set up a field study in Brazil in 2018 that resulted in suppression of up to 96% of disease-transmitting mosquitoes.

=== Treatment ===
While as of 2025 there is no treatment for the disease, paracetamol (acetaminophen) and rest may help with the symptoms. Admission to a hospital is rarely necessary.

Treatment of Zika includes getting plenty of rest, drinking a lot of fluids to stay hydrated, and over-the-counter medicines such as acetaminophen to relieve fever and pain. It is not recommended to take aspirin or other non-steroidal anti-inflammatory drugs until after dengue infection is ruled out. If the patient is taking treatment for another medical condition the attending physician can advise about any other drug or additional treatment.

=== Vaccine development ===
The World Health Organization has suggested that priority should be given to developing inactivated vaccines and other non-live vaccines, which are safe for pregnant women to use.

As of March 2016, 18 companies and institutions were developing vaccines against Zika, but they stated that a vaccine was unlikely to be widely available for about 10 years; there were none as of 2025.

In June 2016, the FDA granted the first approval for a human clinical trial for a Zika vaccine. In March 2017, a DNA vaccine was approved for phase-2 clinical trials. This vaccine consists of a small, circular piece of DNA, known as a plasmid, that expresses the genes for the Zika virus envelope proteins. As the vaccine does not contain the full sequence of the virus, it cannot cause infection. Since 2022, this DNA vaccine sponsored by the National Institute of Allergy and Infectious Diseases has completed phase 2.

As of April 2017, both subunit and inactivated vaccines have entered clinical trials. However, for epidemics that appear sporadically and unpredictably such as caused by Zika and several other arboviruses, precautionary vaccination of large populations may be prohibitively expensive, but distribution of vaccine in response to a sudden explosive epidemic may be too slow.

=== Complications ===
Although Zika virus is mostly known for its association with birth defects such as microcephaly, it can also cause other pregnancy issues such as fetal loss, stillbirth and preterm birth. Furthermore, it has also been linked to a neurological disorder called Guillain-Barré syndrome. This disorder results in damage to nerve cells that may cause muscle weakness and even paralysis. Although these symptoms last temporarily and most people fully recover, some people affected may end up with permanent damage. Additionally, it is known that Zika viruses can rarely cause encephalitis, meningitis, or myelitis. It may also rarely result in a blood disorder which can affect clotting time and cause increased bleeding.

== History ==
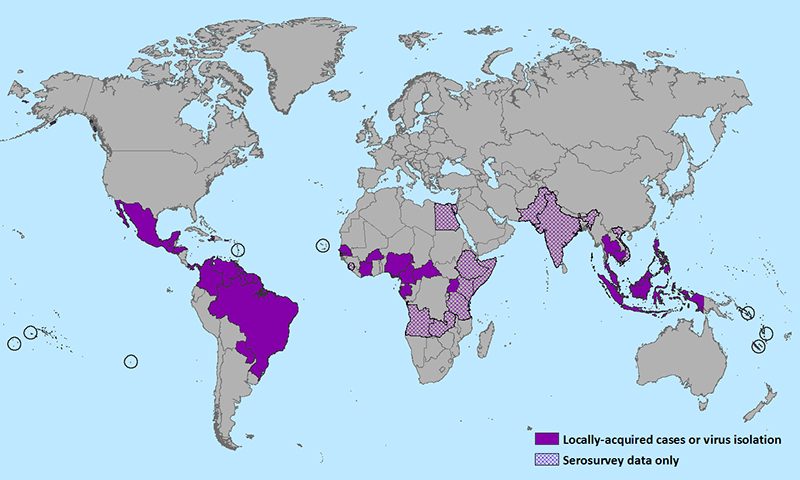
Countries that have past or current evidence of Zika transmission (as of January 2016)

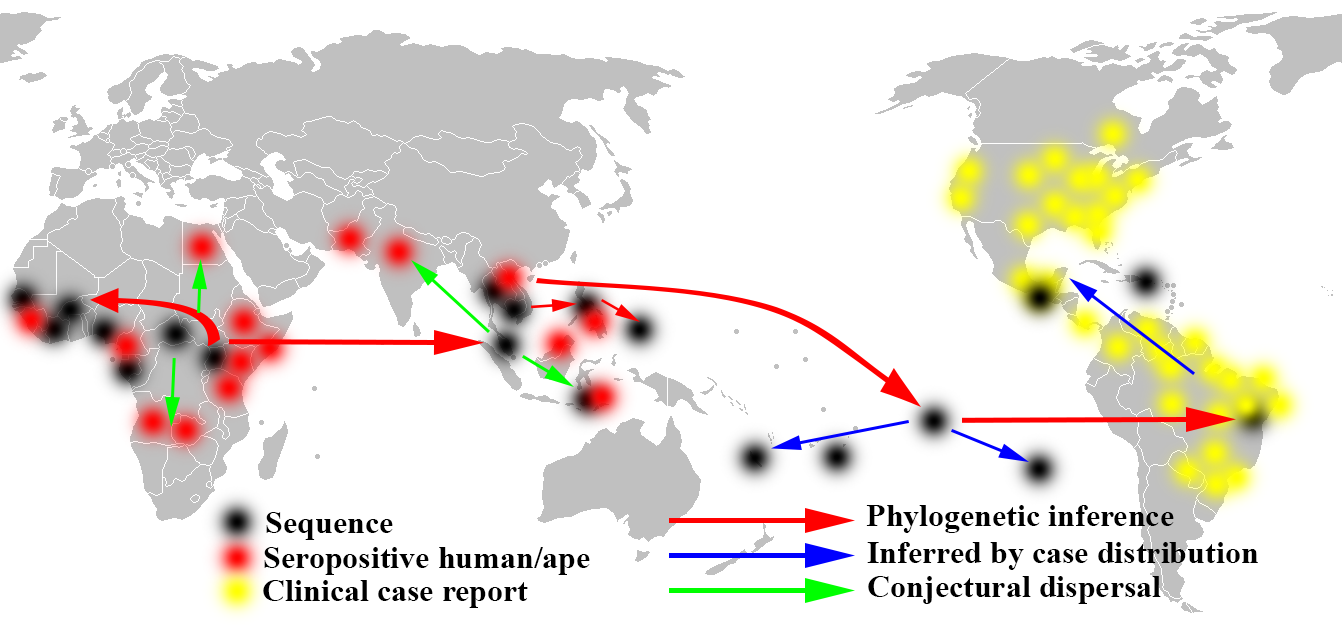
Spread of Zika

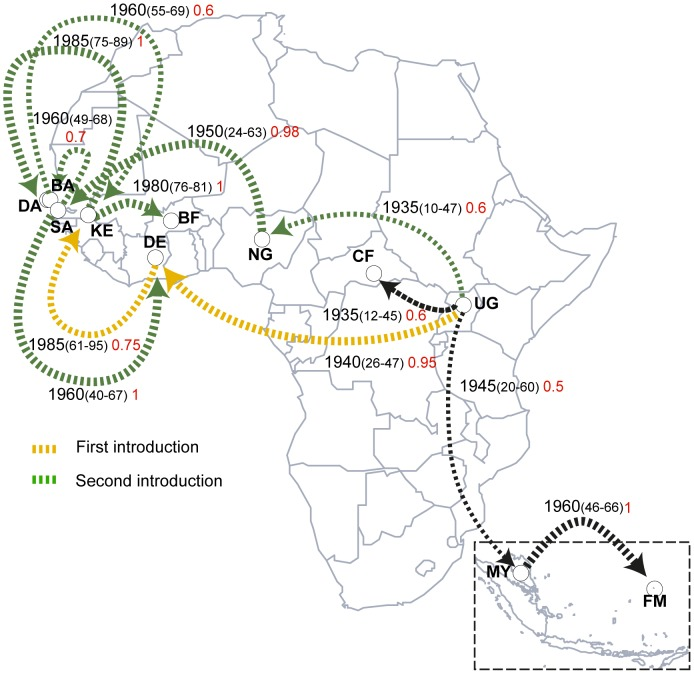
Spread of Zika in Africa and Asia, based on molecular sequence data.

=== Virus isolation in monkeys and mosquitoes, 1947 ===
The virus was first isolated in April 1947 from a rhesus macaque monkey placed in a cage in the Ziika Forest of Uganda, near Lake Victoria, by the scientists of the Yellow Fever Research Institute. A second isolation from the mosquito A. africanus followed at the same site in January 1948. When the monkey developed a fever, researchers isolated from its serum a "filterable transmissible agent" which was named Zika in 1948.

=== First evidence of human infection, 1952 ===
Zika was first known to infect humans from the results of a serological survey in Uganda, published in 1952. Of 99 human blood samples tested, 6.1% had neutralizing antibodies. As part of a 1954 outbreak investigation of jaundice suspected to be yellow fever, researchers reported isolation of the virus from a patient, but the pathogen was later shown to be the closely related Spondweni virus. Spondweni was also determined to be the cause of a self-inflicted infection in a researcher reported in 1956.

=== Spread in equatorial Africa and to Asia, 1951–present ===
Subsequent serological studies in several African and Asian countries indicated the virus had been widespread within human populations in these regions. The first true case of human infection was identified by Simpson in 1964, who was himself infected while isolating the virus from mosquitoes. From then until 2007, there were only 13 further confirmed human cases of Zika infection from Africa and Southeast Asia. A study published in 2017 showed that the Zika virus, despite only a few cases were reported, has been silently circulated in West Africa for the last two decades when blood samples collected between 1992 and 2016 were tested for the ZIKV IgM antibodies. In 2017, Angola reported two cases of Zika fever. Zika was also occurring in Tanzania as of 2016.

=== Micronesia, 2007 ===
In April 2007, the first outbreak outside of Africa and Asia occurred on the island of Yap in the Federated States of Micronesia, characterized by rash, conjunctivitis, and arthralgia, which was initially thought to be dengue, chikungunya, or Ross River disease. Serum samples from patients in the acute phase of illness contained RNA of Zika. There were 49 confirmed cases, 59 unconfirmed cases, no hospitalizations, and no deaths.

=== 2013–2014 ===
After October 2013 Oceania's first outbreak showed an estimated 11% population infected for French Polynesia that also presented with Guillain–Barre syndrome (GBS). The spread of ZIKV continued to New Caledonia, Easter Island, and the Cook Islands and where 1385 cases were confirmed by January 2014. During the same year, Easter Island acknowledged 51 cases. Australia began seeing cases in 2012. Research showed it was brought by travelers returning from Indonesia and other infected countries. New Zealand also experienced infections rate increases through returning foreign travelers. Oceania countries experiencing Zika today are New Caledonia, Vanuatu, Solomon Islands, Marshall Islands, American Samoa, Samoa, and Tonga.

Between 2013 and 2014, further epidemics occurred in French Polynesia, Easter Island, the Cook Islands, and New Caledonia. The epidemics in six archipelagos in French Polynesia infected approximately 94% (95% CI: 91–97%) of the population, and, if ZIKV infection provides complete protection against future infection, it may take 12–20 years before there are a sufficient number of susceptible individuals for ZIKV to re-emerge.

=== Americas, 2015–present ===
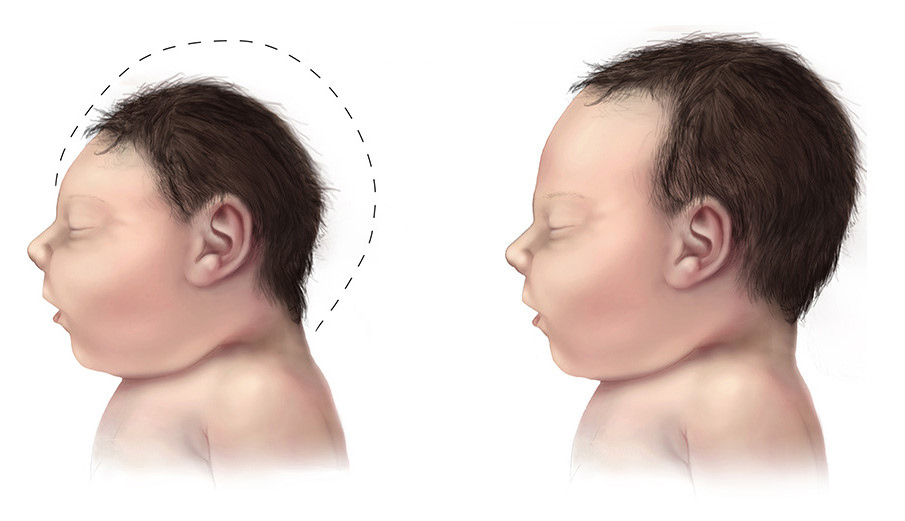
Image of a baby with microcephaly (left) compared to a normal baby (right). This is one of the potential effects of Zika virus. Signs of microcephaly may develop a few months after birth.

There was an epidemic in 2015 and 2016 in the Americas. The outbreak began in April 2015 in Brazil, and spread to other countries in South America, Central America, North America, and the Caribbean. In January 2016, the WHO said the virus was likely to spread throughout most of the Americas by the end of the year; and in February 2016, the WHO declared the cluster of microcephaly and Guillain–Barré syndrome cases reported in Brazil – strongly suspected to be associated with the Zika outbreak – a Public Health Emergency of International Concern. It was estimated that 1.5 million people were infected by Zika in Brazil, with over 3,500 cases of microcephaly reported between October 2015 and January 2016.

A number of countries issued travel warnings, and the outbreak was expected to significantly impact the tourism industry. Several countries took the unusual step of advising their citizens to delay pregnancy until more was known about the virus and its impact on fetal development. With the 2016 Summer Olympics hosted in Rio de Janeiro, health officials worldwide voiced concerns over a potential crisis, both in Brazil and when international athletes and tourists returned home and possibly would spread the virus. Some researchers speculated that only one or two tourists might be infected during the three-week period, or approximately 3.2 infections per 100,000 tourists. In November 2016, the World Health Organization declared that Zika virus was no longer a global emergency while noting that the virus still represents "a highly significant and a long-term problem".

As of August 2017 the number of new Zika virus cases in the Americas had fallen dramatically.

=== India, Bangladesh ===
On 22 March 2016, Reuters reported that Zika was isolated from a 2014 blood sample of an elderly man in Chittagong in Bangladesh as part of a retrospective study.

On May 15, 2017, three cases of Zika virus infection in India were reported in the state of Gujarat. By late 2018, there had been at least 159 cases in Rajasthan and 127 in Madhya Pradesh.

In July 2021, the first case of Zika virus infection in the Indian state of Kerala was reported. After the first confirmed case, 19 other people who had previously presented symptoms were tested, and 13 of those had positive results, showing that Zika had been circulating in Kerala since at least May 2021. By August 6th 2021, there had been 65 reported cases in Kerala.

On October 22, 2021, an officer in the Indian Air Force in Kanpur tested positive for Zika virus, making it the first reported case in the Indian state of Uttar Pradesh.

=== East Asia ===
Between August and November 2016, 455 cases of Zika virus infection were confirmed in Singapore.

In 2023, 722 Zika virus cases were reported in Thailand. From 2019-2022 the Robert Koch-Institut reported 29 imported Zikavirus cases imported into Germany. Of the altogether 16 imported Zika virus cases in 2023, 10 were diagnosed after a trip to Thailand with 62% of all Zika virus cases a significant relative and absolute increase.

== See also ==
- Wolbachia
