= Mosquito Alert =

Mosquito citizen science project

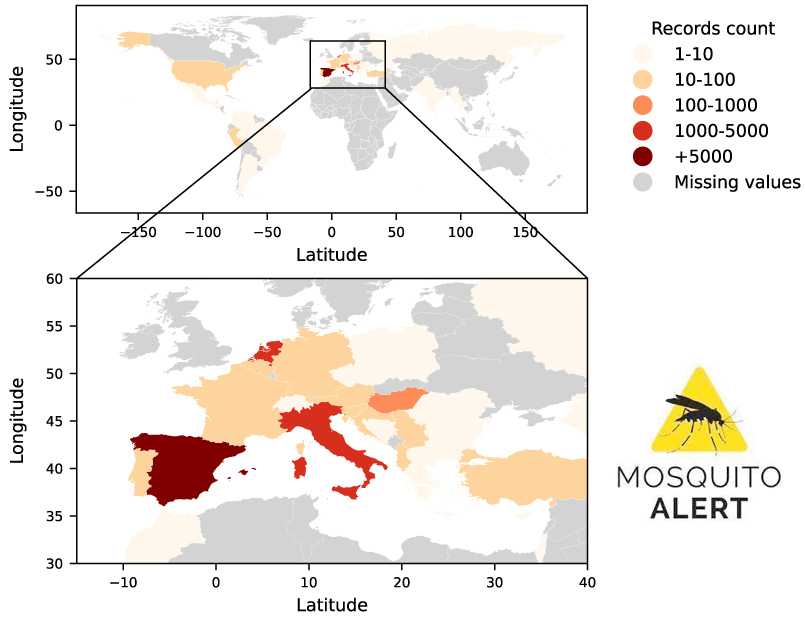
Mosquito Alert coverage in Europe

Mosquito Alert is a cooperative citizen science project, currently run as a non-profit and coordinated by four public research centers in Spain. The aim of the project is to study, monitor, and fight the spread of invasive mosquitoes transmitting global diseases such as dengue, Zika, Chikungunya or West Nile fever. The Asian tiger mosquito (Aedes albopictus) and the yellow fever mosquito (Aedes aegypti) are some of the invasive species that Mosquito Alert watches out for. The project provided the first detection of the Asian bush mosquito Aedes japonicus in Spain in 2018, providing the first report of a population of mosquitos that were located 1,300 km from their previously nearest known location in Europe.

Surveillance is carried out with the Mosquito Alert app, which allows anyone with a smartphone to take a photo and report the possible discovery of one of the mosquitoes studied as well as their breeding sites. A team of expert entomologists validates the photos received and notifies the participant of the result. With ongoing work also integrating automated deep learning into the identification process. The results are published on the public map, where users can consult and download the observations recorded since the project launched in 2014, as well as explore the models and results developed from this data. Data has also been openly shared via the UN Environment Program Global Mosquito Alert project, and the Global Biodiversity Information Facility database. While most of the coverage to date has been in Spain, there has been increasing coverage in Europe since 2020, particularly in the Netherlands, Italy, and Hungary. With CitizenScience.Asia promoting the use in Hong Kong with a Traditional Chinese translation of the open source app, and mobilisation via school projects.

== See also ==
- Mosquito control
