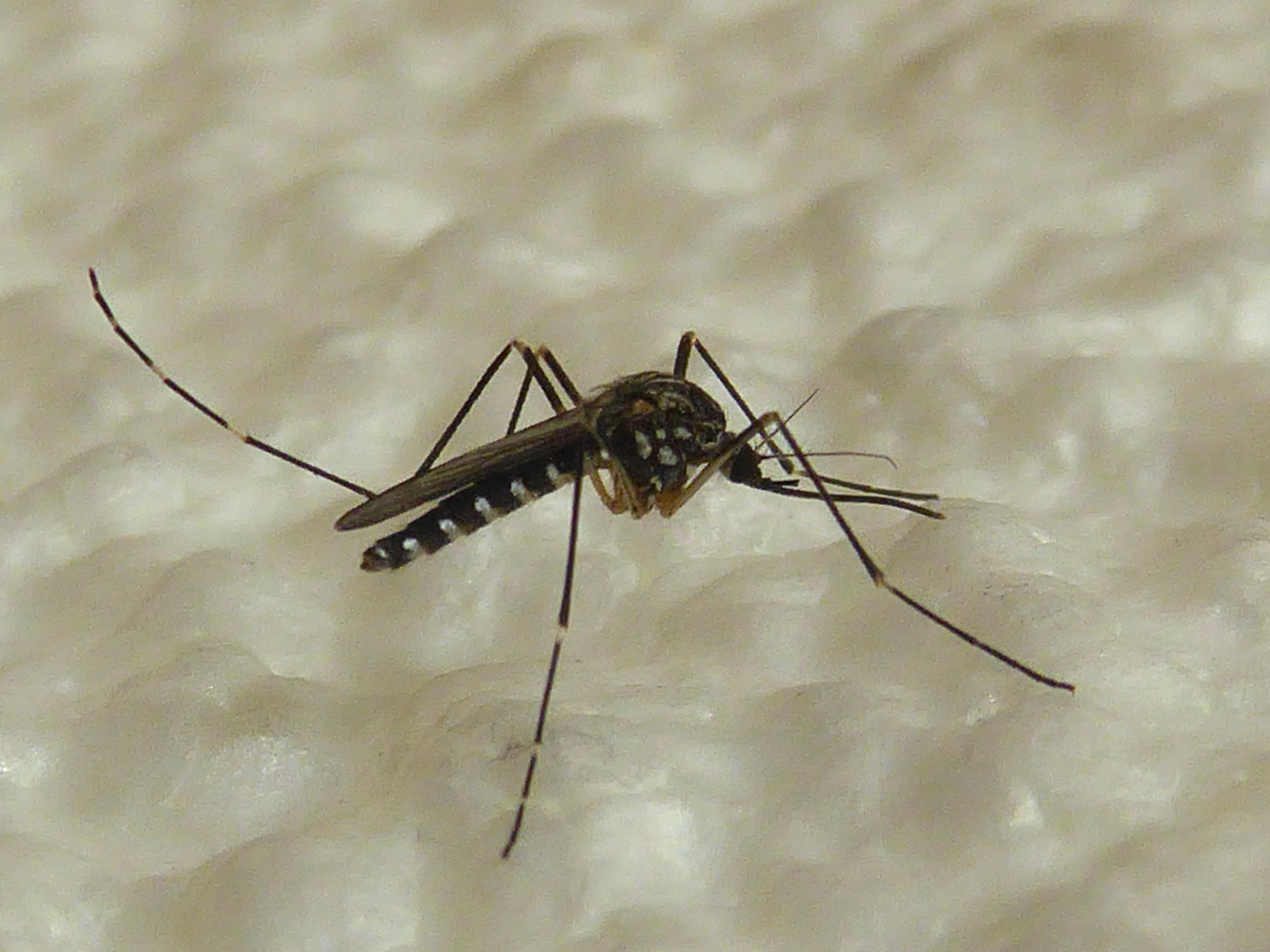

Scientific classification
- Kingdom: Animalia
- Phylum: Arthropoda
- Clade: Pancrustacea
- Class: Insecta
- Order: Diptera
- Family: Culicidae
- Genus: Aedes
- Subgenus: Hulecoeteomyia
- Species: A. koreicus

Binomial name
- Aedes koreicus (Edwards, 1917)

= Aedes koreicus =

Species of mosquito

Aedes koreicus, the Korean bush mosquito is a species of mosquito in the genus Aedes. The adults are relatively large with a black and white pattern on their legs and other body parts. Clear longitudinal lines on the dorsal part of the thorax distinguish it from Ae. aegypti and Ae. albopictus. The species bears close morphological, ecological, and genetic similarity to the Asian bush mosquito, Aedes japonicus, but can be physically distinguished by a pale basal band on the hind tarsomere.

== Breeding and eggs ==
Aedes koreicus is known to be a container breeding mosquito. They lay eggs in all types of artificial containers and natural holes that are found in plants and rocks in urban, peri urban, and natural environments. Aedes koreicus lay approximately 100 eggs at a time, and can lay eggs up to three times per life cycle. Ae. koreicus eggs have long survival rates due to their resistance to desiccation and have a notably high tolerance to cold temperatures. Aedes koreicus are known to lay their eggs during colder temperatures in preparation for a spring hatch. Adults avoid larval competition with other species in order to survive. Higher temperatures result in a lower abundance of Aedes koreicus, and diminished reproduction rates.

== Feeding habits ==
Though Aedes koreicus express opportunistic host-feeding behavior, they are known to feed on human blood meals depending on their location. Depending on if they are in an urban, peri-urban, or rural area, will determine which hosts are available to feed on. Aedes koreicus feed on different species based on where they are, and which species is most locally abundant. They feed on other mammals and species such as Roe deer, which are the primary host in forested sites, whereas humans are the primary host in urban areas. Aedes koreicus typically feed on the most abundant and locally available hosts. Their feeding patterns depend on temperature, host availability, and host preference. Aedes koreicus show minimal to no evidence of mixed blood meals, meaning Aedes koreicus does not feed on multiple organisms or species over their lifetime. Aedes koreicus displays the most odd feeding patterns in comparison to the other mosquitoes in their genus. This is because other mosquitos in the Aedes genus are known to have fixed blood meals, and feed on multiple hosts throughout their lives. Aedes Koreicus feed on the most available and locally abundant. There is no singular preference for Aedes Koreicus, while other Aedes mosquitos show evidence of preferred blood meals. Completion of the ovarian cycle and production of viable offspring require taking of a blood meal, which means they need to feed on a host blood meal in order to reproduce and complete life cycles. Aedes koreicus is able to complete their life cycle from feeding on animals other than humans. They are not dependent on human blood meals for survival, but still feed on humans depending on availability and abundance.

== Vector capabilities ==
Aedes koreicus vectoral capacities are estimated based on feeding habits and their blood meals. Aedes koreicus are known to feed on domestic animals, farm animals, and humans. The diversity of blood meals allows for different levels of vector capacities. Based on their feeding patterns, Aedes koreicus can act as vectors for several different pathogens such as Chikungunya, Zika or Yellow fever. Many of these viruses directly affect public and human health. Aedes koreicus can act as a vector for human-to-human transmitted viruses, as well as a vector for animal-to-human viruses. Aedes koreicus are able to act as a vector for native pathogens, as well as introduced pathogens. Aedes korecius are also considered to be bridge vectors between mammals and birds.

== Distribution and invasiveness ==
Aedes koreicus is native to northeastern China, South Korea, and southern Russia. Its similarity to Ae. japonicus suggests the same potential for invasiveness and tolerance to cooler, temperate climates found at higher altitudes. Transcriptomic and comparative genomic analyses have detected thermal adaptation genes shared between Ae. koreicus and Ae. japonicus but not with other aedines. Cold-resistant dormant eggs allow adults to persist from late summer until autumn seasons and are believed to increase ability to establish populations in cold environments.

In 2008, the species was first detected outside of its native range in an industrial area in Maasmechelen, a province of Belgium. The species was first reported in the Belluno province of Italy in 2011, but has since expanded to Genoa and the Lombardy region. Ae. koreicus has been identified in Sochi on the eastern Black Sea coast of Russia, Switzerland, and Slovenia in 2013. The species was found in southern Germany in 2015 and a population was established in western Germany in 2016. The first appearance in Hungary and the southern coast of the Crimean Peninsula was reported in 2016, in Austria in 2018, and the Republic of Kazakhstan in 2021.

== Public health and population control ==
=== Surveillance and sampling ===
While no specific surveillance for Aedes koreicus exists, distribution and biodiversity of invasive mosquitoes and vectors of pathogens is monitored by various EU initiatives, including the Belgian MODIRISK project, and VectorNet, a collaboration between the European Food Safety Authority and the European Centre for Disease Prevention and Control. The Aedes Invasive Mosquito COST action was initiated in 2018 to promote data sharing and harmonization of European surveillance and management of relevant Aedes species

Invasive mosquito species surveillance widely uses the Biogents Sentinel Trap, the Centers for Disease Control light trap, and the gravid trap. The gravid trap was primarily used to collect Ae. koreicus adults in a study in Belgium. A 2017 study conducted in urban and forested sites in northern Italy found that of the three standard traps tested, only the CDC light trap was unproductive in urban environments, while all types were effective in collection of Ae. koreicus adults in vegetated areas.

== Insecticides ==
Overuse of chemical control methods for vector mosquitoes has increased resistance to the widely used pyrethroid insecticides, involving knockdown resistance (kdr)-related gene mutations in vector mosquito species. To date, few studies have monitored kdr resistance in Ae. koreicus and limited data from genomic sequencing detected no resistant genotypes for kdr mutation in DNA isolated from a population in the Korean Hwarang reservoir. However, comparative analysis has identified several genes within the Ae. koreicus genome involved in structural protein synthesis and ion channel regulation that are plausibly involved in possible insecticide resistance mechanisms.

== Manipulation of mosquito-associated microbiota ==
Microbial-based control measures have been developed to prevent further expansion and limit the spread of mosquito-borne pathogens through introduction of entomopathogenic bacteria, endosymbiotic bacteria, and genetically engineered symbionts. These methods require additional characterization of microbiota and identification of microbial symbionts within the Ae. koreicus vector species. 16S next generation sequencing of microbiomes from Ae. koreicus populations in the Trento Province of north-eastern Italy suggest Asia, Pseudomonas, and Thorsellia as potential candidates for paratransgenesis and upregulation of the host immune response. Wolbachia-based control interventions emerged as a possible strategy from microbiome sequencing of adults of this species collected in the Belluno Province region.
