= Mosquito control =

Efforts to reduce damage from mosquitoes

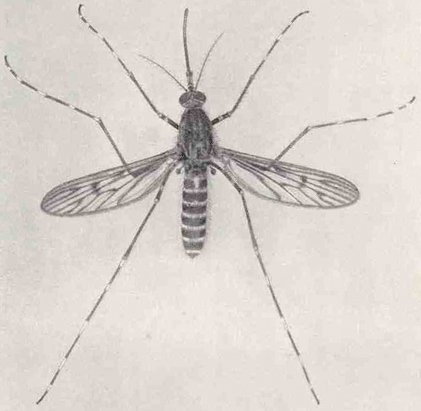
Mosquitoes are generally considered annoying and some species transmit diseases, thus leading to a variety of human efforts to eradicate or reduce their presence.

The population of mosquitoes is managed to reduce their damage to human health, economies, and enjoyment. Control strategies range from habitat modification and chemical insecticides to biological agents and mechanical traps. Rising global temperatures have expanded mosquito habitats and disease risks, prompting a greater focus on community-led education programs to play key roles in reducing breeding grounds and tracking mosquito populations.

== Background ==
Mosquito-control operations are targeted to multiple problems:

- Nuisance mosquitoes bother people around homes or in parks and recreational areas;
- Economically important mosquitoes reduce real estate values, adversely affect tourism and related business interests, or negatively impact livestock or poultry production;
- Public health is the focus when mosquitoes are vectors, or transmitters, of infectious disease.
- Mosquito-borne diseases can threaten endangered species.

Disease organisms transmitted by mosquitoes include West Nile virus, Saint Louis encephalitis virus, Eastern equine encephalomyelitis virus, Everglades virus, Highlands J virus, La Crosse encephalitis virus in the United States; dengue fever, yellow fever, Ilhéus virus, malaria, Zika virus and filariasis in the American tropics; Rift Valley fever, Wuchereria bancrofti, Japanese encephalitis, chikungunya and filariasis in Africa and Asia; and Murray Valley encephalitis and Ross River fever in Australia. Vertical transmission from adult mosquitos to larvae is possible.

Depending on the situation, source reduction, biocontrol, larviciding (killing of larvae), or adulticiding (killing of adults) may be used to manage mosquito populations. These techniques are accomplished using habitat modification, pesticide, biological-control agents, and trapping. The advantage of non-toxic methods of control is they can be used in conservation areas.

Integrated pest management (IPM) is the use of the most environmentally appropriate method or combination of methods to control pest populations. Typical mosquito-control programs using IPM first conduct surveys to determine the species composition, relative abundance, and seasonal distribution of adult and larval mosquitoes, and only then is a control strategy defined.

Mosquito control programs typically target multiple stages of the mosquito life cycle using a combination of approaches. One of the most important is source reduction, which removes standing water where mosquitoes lay eggs, such as buckets, tires, clogged gutters, and bird baths. Consistent source reduction lowers the number of larvae that can develop into adults and reduces the need for chemical treatments. When water cannot be eliminated, control efforts often shift to larvicides, which kill mosquitoes in their aquatic stages, and to adulticides, which reduce adult mosquito populations during periods of high nuisance or disease transmission. These methods are usually combined in an integrated framework that balances effectiveness with environmental and public health considerations.

== Monitoring mosquito populations ==
Adult mosquito populations may be monitored by landing rate counts, mechanical traps, or by lidar technology. For landing rate counts, an inspector visits a set number of sites every day, counting the number of adult female mosquitoes that land on a part of the body, such as an arm or both legs, within a given time interval. Mechanical traps use a fan to blow adult mosquitoes into a collection bag that is taken back to the laboratory for analysis of catch. The mechanical traps use visual cues (light, black/white contrasts) or chemical attractants that are normally given off by mosquito hosts (e.g., carbon dioxide, ammonia, lactic acid, octenol) to attract adult female mosquitoes. These cues are often used in combination. Entomology lidar detection has the possibility of showing the difference between male and female mosquitoes.

Monitoring larval mosquito populations involves collecting larvae from standing water with a dipper or a turkey baster. The habitat, approximate total number of larvae and pupae, and species are noted for each collection. An alternative method works by providing artificial breeding spots (ovitraps) and collecting and counting the developing larvae at fixed intervals. Monitoring these mosquito populations is crucial to see what species are present, if mosquito numbers are rising or falling, and detecting any diseases they carry.

Mosquito Alert is a cooperative citizen science project, currently run as a non-profit and coordinated by four public research centers in Spain. The aim of the project is to study, monitor, and fight the spread of invasive mosquitos. The project provided the first detection of the Asian bush mosquito Aedes japonicus in Spain in 2018, providing the first report of a population of mosquitos that were located 1,300 km from their previously nearest known location in Europe.

== Climate change and mosquito habitats ==
Climate change has enabled mosquitoes such as Aedes aegypti and Aedes albopictus to spread into new geographic regions, including temperate areas where they were previously unable to survive. Warmer temperatures accelerate mosquito development, shorten breeding cycles, and increase biting frequency, all of which enhance the potential for disease transmission. Shifts in rainfall patterns and the increased frequency of extreme weather events also create more stagnant water sources, which are ideal breeding grounds for mosquitoes. These ecological changes have contributed to the emergence or resurgence of mosquito-borne diseases such as dengue, Zika, and chikungunya in parts of Europe and North America. In response, public health organizations have begun integrating climate-based data, remote sensing, and predictive modeling into their surveillance systems to monitor habitat suitability and guide early warning efforts for mosquito population surges.

Temperature, humidity, moisture, and rain are some of the weather conditions that affect the mosquito's behavior and activity. Understanding the relationship between climate variables and mosquito ecology is now considered a key component of proactive vector control strategies.

== Mosquito control agencies & operations ==
Mosquito control agencies utilize an Integrated Mosquito Management (see IPM / IMM) framework that prioritizes chemical and biological interventions in order to reduce vector risk and control mosquito nuisance to local human, pet & livestock populations. Operations are the efforts to manage resources, personnel & funds to deliver effective IMM activity over the course of the Mosquito season while meeting public policy requirements.

Agencies responsible for mosquito control are often designated Mosquito Abatement Districts (MAD), Mosquito Control Districts (MCD), or Vector Control Agencies / Districts (VCA / VCD). Some are operated as independent, limited-purpose local government agencies, while others are operated as a public works service within a local government public works agency, often a city or county agency.

Mosquito control logistics vary depending on the scale and accessibility of the target habitat. Mosquito control is labor intensive, requiring staff to deploy larvicide pellets into remote standing water like catch basins and marshes, or adulticide fog into broad woodland or urban habitats. Depending on terrain, staff may employ specialized ground vehicles like ATV and GO-4. For large remote areas, Agencies may utilize helicopters which can cover more territory more efficiently, but are very expensive and require FAA permitting to operate. Modern agencies utilize Unmanned Aircraft Systems (UAS), or drones, to cover difficult or dangerous terrain like salt marshes or dense wetlands.

Inventory and asset management is another major concern for mosquito control. Agencies must maintain a large fleet of vehicles, moderate staff for deploying products, and significant inventory of pesticide product that has a seasonal lifecycle due to mosquito tolerance. The Agency Manager is responsible for assets, inventory, personnel, liability and research, while executing the Integrated Mosquito Management Plan.

Mosquito control depends on public health policy, since policy makers must weigh the risks of mosquito vectors and nuisance against the costs of abatement and potential environmental risk of applying pesticides. Typically Mosquito Control Agencies will be overseen by a public board of trustees who themselves are appointed by elected officials. Agency directors and staff often have degrees in Environmental Science or Microbiology.

== Community-based habitat reduction ==
The following municipalities, territories, and countries have regulations concerning removal of standing water to prevent mosquito breeding:

- Cook Islands
- Eritrea
- French Polynesia
- The Gambia
- Hong Kong
- India
- Kenya
- Mali
- Philippines
- Samoa
- Singapore
- Sri Lanka
- Tanzania
- Tonga
- Municipalities in the United States
  - Los Angeles, California
  - Solana Beach, California
  - Tallahassee, Florida
  - New Orleans, Louisiana
  - Beverly Hills, Texas
  - Corpus Christi, Texas
  - Dallas, Texas
  - Tyler, Texas

=== New Jersey Study ===
A 2010 study in New Jersey evaluated how community participation can improve mosquito control through source reduction. AmeriCorps volunteers were trained to identify and explain mosquito breeding sites such as planters, rain barrels, and discarded containers. These peer educators visited over 750 homes, offering active, on-site education. Compared to control areas, the communities that received active outreach saw a 22.6% decrease in unmanaged container habitats. Additional events like tire disposal and trash can modification days encouraged long-term engagement. The study found that community-driven efforts led to measurable behavior change, particularly when residents had hands-on involvement.

== AI-enabled mosquito surveillance ==
Recent research has explored the use of robotics and artificial intelligence to improve mosquito surveillance. The "Dragonfly" robot, developed in Singapore, uses a deep learning algorithm called YOLO V4 (You Only Look Once version 4) to detect and classify mosquitoes. It can identify Aedes aegypti, Aedes albopictus, and Culex species from glue traps with an accuracy of up to 88% in offline tests and 82% in real-time field trials. The robot maps mosquito detections on a two-dimensional grid, helping researchers visualize population hotspots. This automated approach reduces the need for manual identification and supports faster response times in high-risk areas.

== Mechanical control ==
Mechanical control is the management and control using physical means.

=== Source reduction ===
Since many mosquitoes breed in standing water, source reduction can be as simple as emptying water from containers around the home. This is something that homeowners can accomplish. Mosquito breeding grounds can be eliminated at home by removing unused plastic pools, old tires, or buckets; by clearing clogged gutters and repairing leaks around faucets; by regularly (at most every 4 days) changing water in bird baths; and by filling or draining puddles, swampy areas, and tree stumps. Eliminating such mosquito breeding areas can be an extremely effective and permanent way to reduce mosquito populations without resorting to insecticides. However, this may not be possible in parts of the developing world where water cannot be readily replaced due to irregular water supply. Many individuals also believe mosquito control is the government's responsibility, so if these methods are not done regularly by homeowners then the effectiveness is reduced.

Open water marsh management (OWMM) involves the use of shallow ditches, to create a network of water flow within marshes and to connect the marsh to a pond or canal. The network of ditches drains the mosquito habitat and lets in fish which will feed on mosquito larvae. This reduces the need for other control methods such as pesticides. Simply giving the predators access to the mosquito larvae can result in long-term mosquito control. Open-water marsh management is used on both the eastern and western coasts of the United States.

Rotational impoundment management (RIM) involves the use of large pumps and culverts with gates to control the water level within an impounded marsh. RIM allows mosquito control to occur while still permitting the marsh to function in a state as close to its natural condition as possible. Water is pumped into the marsh in the late spring and summer to prevent the female mosquito from laying her eggs on the soil. The marsh is allowed to drain in the fall, winter, and early spring. Gates in the culverts are used to permit fish, crustaceans, and other marsh organisms to enter and exit the marsh. RIM allows the mosquito-control goals to be met while at the same time reducing the need for pesticide use within the marsh. Rotational impoundment management is used to a great extent on the east coast of Florida.

A 2019 study also explored the idea of using unmanned aerial vehicles as a valid strategy to identify and prioritize water bodies where disease vectors such as Ny. darlingi are most likely to breed.

=== Oil drip ===
An oil drip can or oil drip barrel was a common and nontoxic anti-mosquito measure. The thin layer of oil on top of the water prevents mosquito breeding in two ways: mosquito larvae in the water cannot penetrate the oil film with their breathing tube, and so drown and die; also adult mosquitoes do not lay eggs on the oiled water.

=== Mosquito traps ===
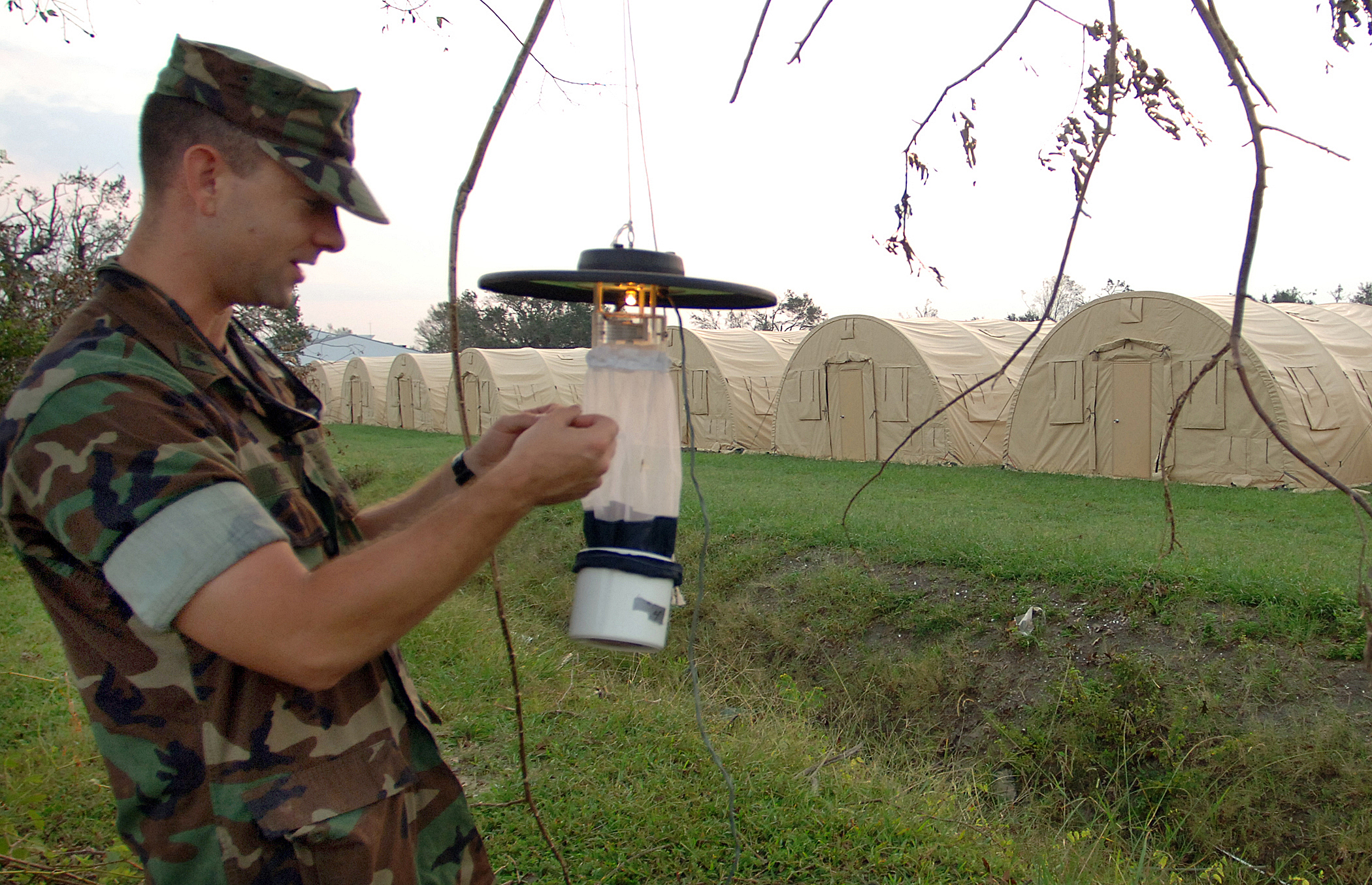
A light trap that attracts and captures mosquitoes.

A traditional approach to controlling mosquito populations is the use of ovitraps or lethal ovitraps, which provide artificial breeding spots for mosquitoes to lay their eggs. While ovitraps only trap eggs, lethal ovitraps usually contain a chemical inside the trap that is used to kill the adult mosquito and/or the larvae in the trap. Studies have shown that with enough of these lethal ovitraps, Aedes mosquito populations can be controlled. A recent approach is the automatic lethal ovitrap, which works like a traditional ovitrap but automates all steps needed to provide the breeding spots and to destroy the developing larvae.

In 2016 researchers from Laurentian University released a design for a low cost trap called an Ovillanta which consists of attractant-laced water in a section of discarded rubber tire. At regular intervals the water is run through a filter to remove any deposited eggs and larva. The water, which then contains an 'oviposition' pheromone deposited during egg-laying, is reused to attract more mosquitoes. Two studies have shown that this type of trap can attract about seven times as many mosquito eggs as a conventional ovitrap.

Some newer mosquito traps or known mosquito attractants emit a plume of carbon dioxide together with other mosquito attractants such as sugary scents, lactic acid, octenol, warmth, water vapor and sounds. By mimicking a mammal's scent and outputs, the trap draws female mosquitoes toward it, where they are typically sucked into a net or holder by an electric fan where they are collected. According to the American Mosquito Control Association, the trap will kill some mosquitoes, but their effectiveness in any particular case will depend on a number of factors such as the size and species of the mosquito population and the type and location of the breeding habitat. They are useful in specimen collection studies to determine the types of mosquitoes prevalent in an area but are typically far too inefficient to be useful in reducing mosquito populations.

=== Trap larva ===
This is a process of achieving sustainable mosquito control in an eco friendly manner by providing artificial breeding grounds with an ovitrap or an ovillanta utilizing common household utensils and destroying larvae by non-hazardous natural means such as throwing them in dry places or feeding them to larvae eating fishes like Gambusia affinis, or suffocating them by spreading a thin plastic sheet over the entire water surface to block atmospheric air. Shifting the water with larvae to another vessel and pouring a few drops of kerosene oil or insecticide/larvicide in it is another option for killing wrigglers, but not preferred due to its environmental impact. Most of the ornamental fishes eat mosquito larvae.

== Chemical control ==
Chemical control is the management and control using chemical means.

=== Larviciding ===
Control of larvae can be accomplished through use of contact poisons, growth regulators, surface films, stomach poisons (including bacterial agents), and biological agents such as fungi, nematodes, copepods, and fish. A chemical commonly used in the United States is methoprene, considered slightly toxic to larger animals, which mimics and interferes with natural growth hormones in mosquito larvae, preventing development. Methoprene is frequently distributed in time-release briquette form in breeding areas. Another chemical is Temefos or temephos, a sand granular insecticide is used to treat water infected with disease carrying insects.

It is believed by some researchers that the larvae of Anopheles gambiae (important vectors of malaria) can survive for several days on moist mud, and that treatments should therefore include mud and soil several meters from puddles.

=== Adulticiding ===
Control of adult mosquitoes is the most familiar aspect of mosquito control to most of the public. It is accomplished by ground-based applications or via aerial application of residual chemical insecticides such as Duet. Generally modern mosquito-control programs in developed countries use low-volume applications of insecticides, although some programs may still use thermal fogging. Beside fogging there are some other insect repellents for indoors and outdoors. An example of a synthetic insect repellent is DEET. A naturally occurring repellent is citronella. Indoor Residual Spraying (IRS) is another method of adulticide. Walls of properties are sprayed with an insecticide, the mosquitoes die when they land on the surface covered in insecticide.

A major challenge for chemical control is the development of insecticide resistance. When the same larvicides or adulticides are used repeatedly, mosquitoes with genetic changes that protect their nervous system or improve detoxification are more likely to survive and reproduce. Over time, these traits can spread through the population, reducing the effectiveness of spraying and other chemical tools and complicating control of diseases such as malaria and dengue. To slow resistance, many programs rotate different insecticide classes and combine chemical treatments with non-chemical measures such as source reduction and biological control.

To control adult mosquitoes in India, van mounted fogging machines and hand fogging machines are used.

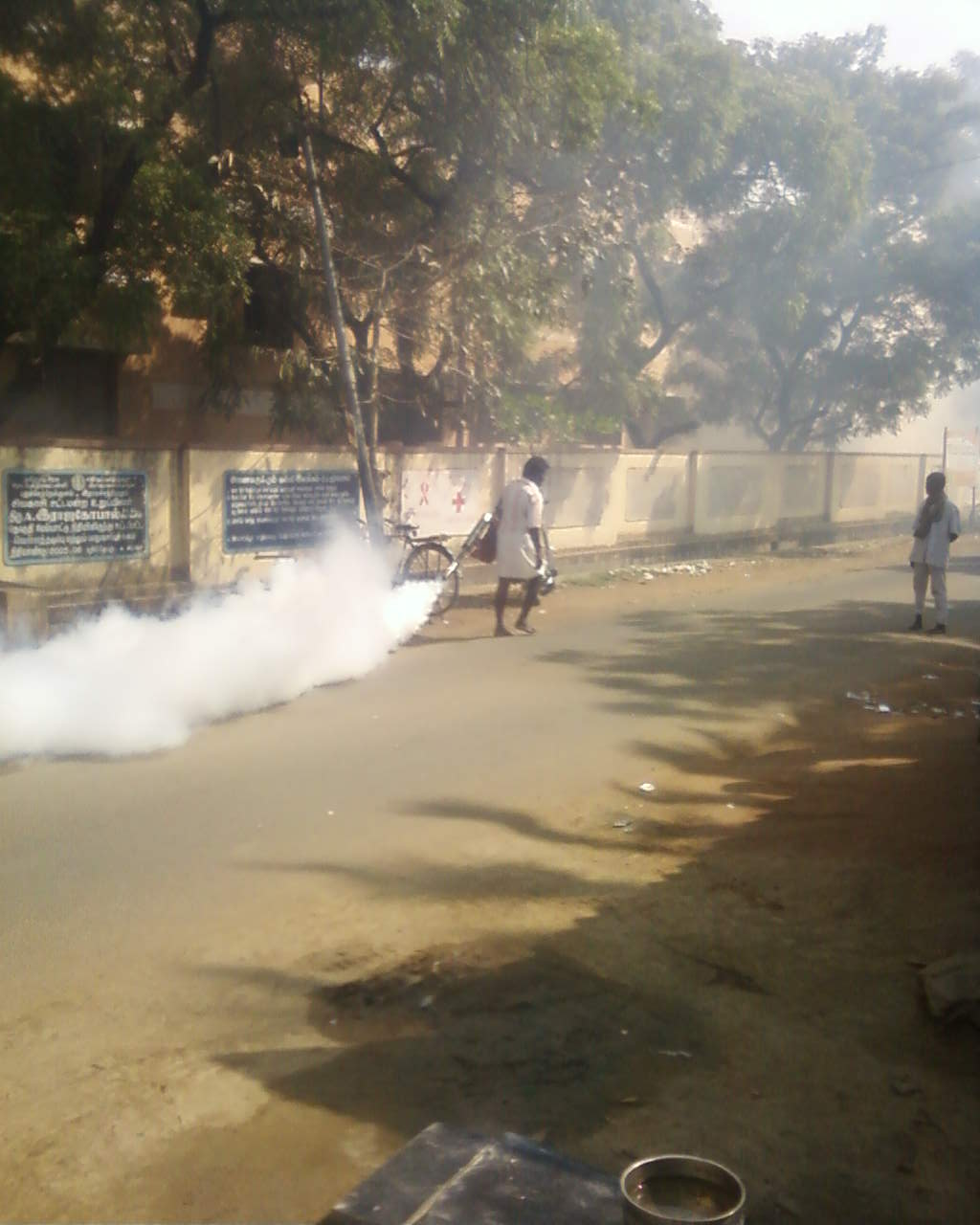
Anti-mosquito fogging operation in India

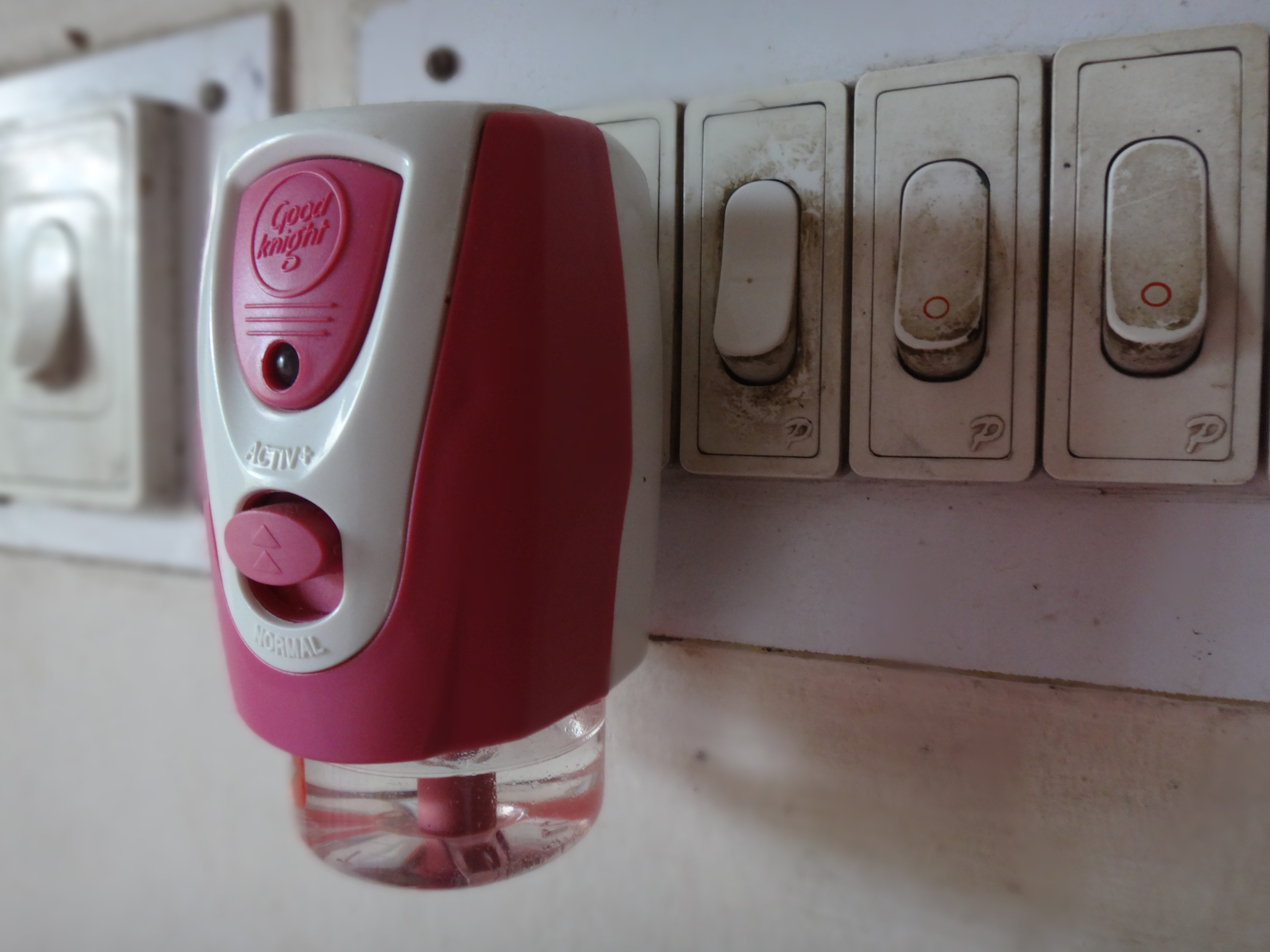
A mosquito repellent vaporizer containing Prallethrin

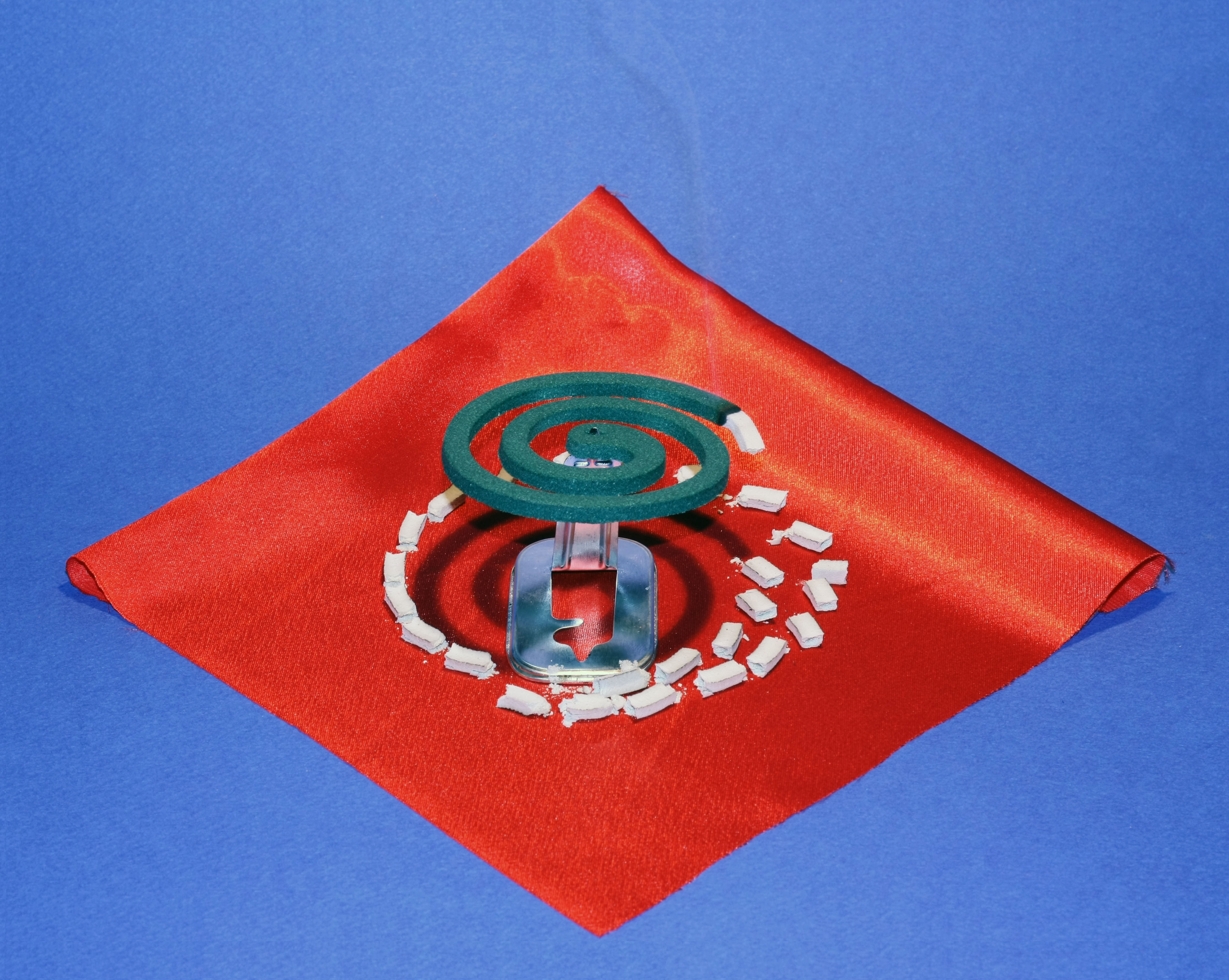
A mosquito coil

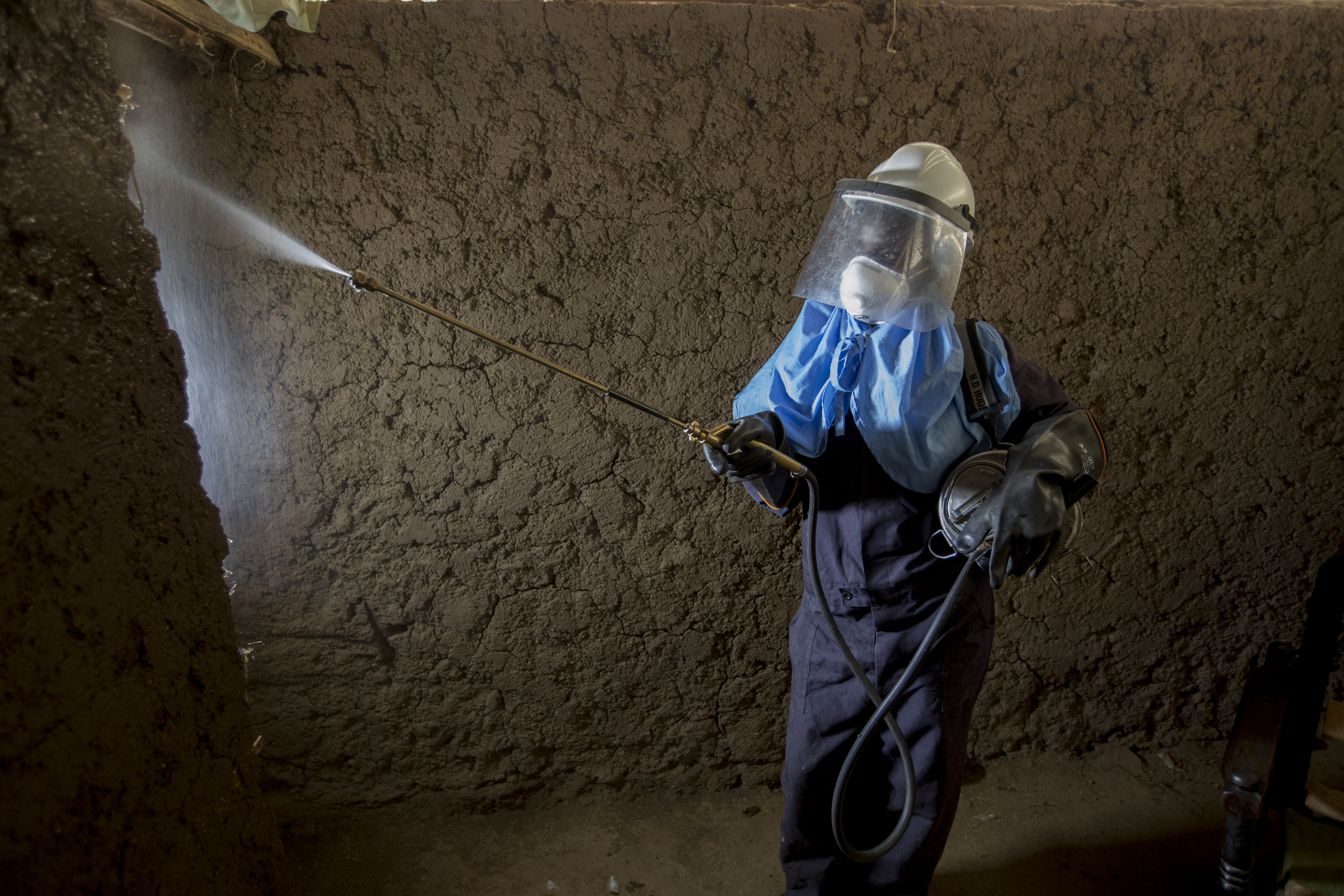
Indoor residual spraying in Kenya

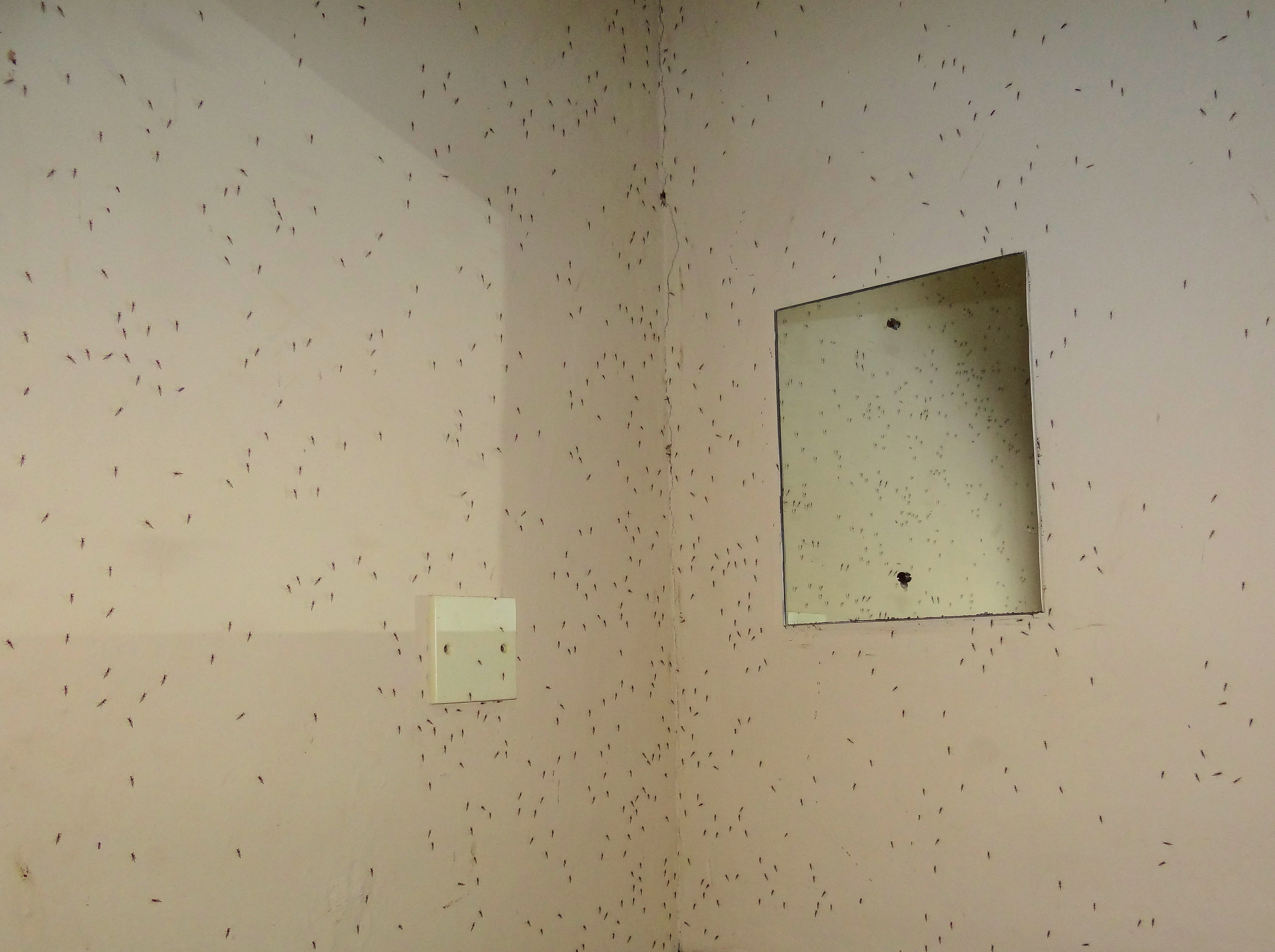
Walls on IRS-treated bathroom on the shores of Lake Victoria. The mosquitoes remain on the wall until they fall down dead on the floor.

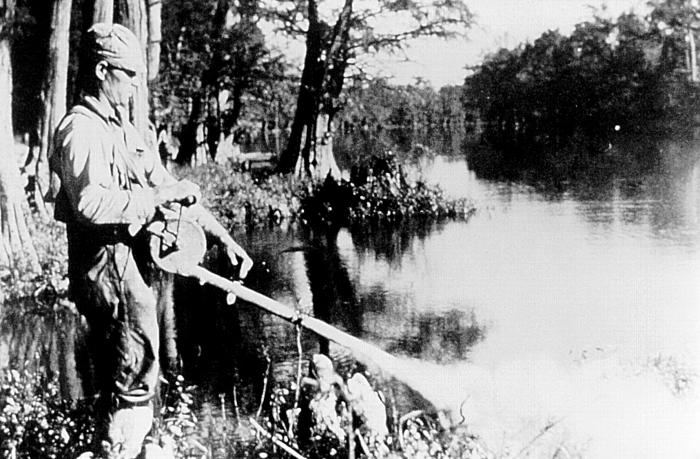
In 1958, the National Malaria Eradication Program implemented the wide-scale use of DDT for mosquito control.

=== Use of DDT ===
DDT was formerly used throughout the world for large area mosquito control, but it is now banned in most developed countries.

Controversially, DDT remains in common use in many developing countries (14 countries were reported to be using it in 2009), which claim that the public-health cost of switching to other control methods would exceed the harm caused by using DDT. It is sometimes approved for use only in specific, limited circumstances where it is most effective, such as application to walls.

The role of DDT in combating mosquitoes has been the subject of considerable controversy. Although DDT has been proven to affect biodiversity and cause eggshell thinning in birds such as the bald eagle, some say that DDT is the most effective weapon in combating mosquitoes, and hence malaria. While some of this disagreement is based on differences in the extent to which disease control is valued as opposed to the value of biodiversity, there is also genuine disagreement amongst experts about the costs and benefits of using DDT.

Notwithstanding, DDT-resistant mosquitoes have started to increase in numbers, especially in tropics due to mutations, reducing the effectiveness of this chemical; these mutations can rapidly spread over vast areas if pesticides are applied indiscriminately (Chevillon et al. 1999). In areas where DDT resistance is encountered, malathion, propoxur or lindane is used.

Toxicant	Dosage in g/m^{2}	Average duration of effectiveness in months
DDT	1 to 2	6 to 12
Lindane	0.5	3
Malathion	2	3
Propoxur	2	3

== Chemicals from body odor that attract mosquitoes ==
Mosquitoes are highly adept at locating their human hosts, largely due to their ability to detect specific chemicals present in human body odor. Research has identified several compounds in human sweat and skin that are particularly attractive to mosquitoes. Understanding these attractants is crucial for developing more effective mosquito control methods, including targeted repellents and traps that mimic human odors to lure mosquitoes away from people.

=== Key attractants ===
1. Carbon dioxide (CO_{2}): One of the most well-known attractants, carbon dioxide is exhaled by humans and detected by mosquitoes from a considerable distance. It is often the initial cue that mosquitoes use to locate potential hosts.
2. Lactic acid: Found in human sweat, lactic acid is a significant attractant for many mosquito species, including those that transmit malaria and dengue fever. Its concentration can vary among individuals, partly explaining why mosquitoes are more attracted to some people than others.
3. Octenol: Also known as mushroom alcohol, octenol is present in human breath and sweat. It is particularly attractive to some mosquito species and is used in combination with carbon dioxide in mosquito traps.
4. Acetone and sulcatone: These compounds are found in human breath and skin, and research has shown that they also play a role in attracting mosquitoes.
5. Ammonia: Released through the skin, especially with increased sweat production, ammonia is another compound that attracts mosquitoes. Moreover, recent studies have implicated other compounds such as fatty acids and certain volatile organic compounds (VOCs) in mosquito attraction, expanding the list of known attractants.

Among these attractants, CO_{2} and lactic acid are considered the most effective, with CO_{2} attracting mosquitoes from the longest distances and lactic acid influencing their preference for certain individuals.

=== Implications for mosquito control ===
Understanding the specific chemicals that attract mosquitoes facilitates the development of innovative control strategies. For example, mosquito traps that emit both CO_{2} and lactic acid have proven more effective in luring mosquitoes away from human populations, significantly reducing the risk of bites and the spread of diseases. Additionally, personal repellents engineered to mask or chemically alter these attractants can render individuals less detectable to mosquitoes. Integrating these repellents into daily personal care routines, especially in regions prone to mosquito-borne diseases, offers a proactive approach to disease prevention.

Research into the chemical properties of human body odor that attract mosquitoes reveals complex interactions between mosquito host-seeking behavior and human chemical signatures. By deciphering these mechanisms, scientists aim to devise solutions that could substantially reduce the incidence of mosquito-borne diseases. Advances in synthetic biology and nanotechnology are opening new avenues for creating targeted compounds and delivery systems that efficiently combat mosquitoes without harming the environment.

=== Enhancements and future directions ===
While existing repellents and traps offer temporary solutions, they frequently fall short due to their limited duration of effectiveness and inconsistent efficacy across different mosquito species. For example, many current repellents do not provide all-night protection, and traps might not attract all types of mosquitoes. Future research should prioritize the discovery of new attractant compounds through molecular biology and high-throughput screening methods, aiming to develop more universally effective and durable mosquito control solutions.

Addressing the ecological impacts of widespread use of chemical attractants and repellents is also imperative, but these methods should not harm non-target species or disrupt ecological balances. In practical scenarios, leveraging these insights could transform how we manage mosquito populations and reduce disease transmission. With ongoing technological advancements and deeper understanding of mosquito ecology, development of next-generation repellents and attractant-based traps could provide environmentally friendly protection against mosquitoes.

== Biological control ==
Biological control is the management and control using biological means.

=== Natural predation ===
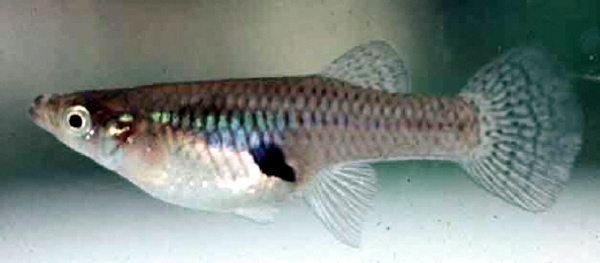
Gambusia affinis (Mosquitofish), a natural mosquito predator.

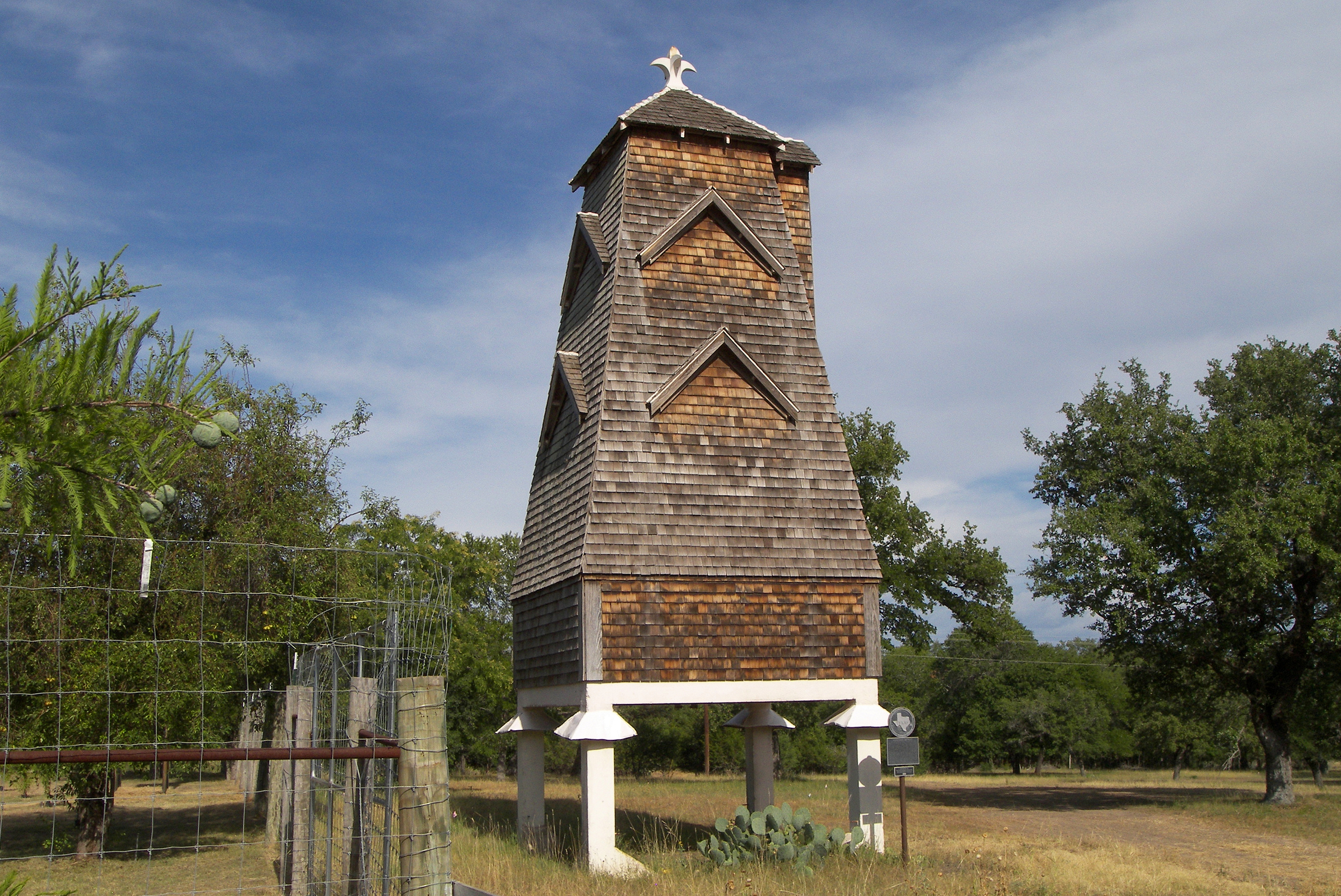
A Hygieostatic Bat Roost, custom-built to house bats for biocontrol of mosquitos

Biological pest control, or "biocontrol", is the use of the natural predators of pests like mosquitoes to manage the pest's populations. There are several types of biocontrol, including the direct introduction of parasites, pathogens, and predators to target mosquitoes. Effective biocontrol agents include predatory fish that feed on mosquito larvae such as mosquitofish (Gambusia affinis) and some cyprinids (carps and minnows) and killifish. Tilapia also consume mosquito larvae. Direct introduction of tilapia and mosquitofish into ecosystems around the world have had disastrous consequences. However, utilizing a controlled system via aquaponics provides the mosquito control without the adverse effects to the ecosystem.

Other predators include dragonfly (fly) naiads, which consume mosquito larvae in the breeding waters, adult dragonflies, which eat adult mosquitoes, and some species of lizard and gecko. Biocontrol agents that have had lesser degrees of success include the predator mosquito Toxorhynchites and predator crustaceans—Mesocyclops copepods, nematodes and fungi. Predators such as birds, bats, lizards, and frogs have been used, but their effectiveness is only anecdotal.

=== Biocides ===
Instead of chemical insecticides, some researchers are studying biocides. Like all animals, mosquitoes are subject to disease. Invertebrate pathologists study these diseases in the hope that some of them can be utilized for mosquito management. Microbial pathogens of mosquitoes include viruses, bacteria, fungi, protozoa, nematodes and microsporidia.

Most notably, scientists in Burkina Faso were studying the Metarhizium fungal species. This fungus in a high concentration can slowly kill mosquitoes. To increase the lethality of the fungus, a gene from a spider was inserted into the fungus causing it to produce a neurotoxin. The gene was regulated to only activate when in mosquito hemolymph. Research was done to show the fungi would not affect other insects or humans. Two other species of fungi that can kill adult mosquitoes are Metarhizium anisopliae and Beauveria bassiana.

Dead spores of the soil bacterium Bacillus thuringiensis, especially Bt israelensis (BTI) interfere with dipteran larval digestive systems. It can be dispersed by hand or dropped by helicopter in large areas. BTI loses effectiveness after the larvae turn into pupae, because they stop eating. BTI was reported to be widely applied in West Africa with limited adverse effects, and may pose lesser risk than chemical pesticides.

=== Wolbachia method ===
In the Wolbachia method, both male and female mosquitos that carry the Wolbachia bacterium are released into natural populations. Wolbachia boosts the natural immune response of the mosquito so that it does not easily get infected and become a host vector for mosquito-borne diseases. Therefore it is unable to easily transmit those viruses to people. This is known as replacement strategy as it aims to replace the natural population with Wolbachia-carrying ones. Since 2011, the World Mosquito Program has conducted several trials and projects, in 14 countries across Asia, Latin America and Oceania. In a cluster-randomized trial in Yogyakarta, Indonesia, release of Wolbachia-infected Aedes aegypti mosquitoes was associated with a 77% reduction in dengue incidence compared with control areas (Utarini et al., 2021).

=== Incompatible Insect Technique (IIT) ===
This approach also uses Wolbachia but involves the release of only male mosquitos that carry the Wolbachia bacterium. When these male mosquitos mate with wild female mosquitos, her eggs do not hatch due to lack of biocompatibility. Wolbachia is not endemic to wild mosquito populations although it is endemic in 50% of all insect species. This is known as suppression strategy as it aims to suppress the natural reproduction cycle. Wolbachia-Aedes suppression has been piloted in various countries such as Myanmar (1967), French Polynesia (2009, 2012), USA (2014-2016, 2018), Thailand (2016), Australia (2017), Singapore (since 2016) and Puerto Rico (2020).

==== Projects ====
Maui and Kuai, Hawaii - A series of IIT projects were planned to protect endangered bird species from avian malaria. The projects involve the release of large numbers of male mosquitos infected with a strain of Wolbachia that is incompatible with the strain carried by resident females. These mosquitos would not be irradiated or subject to genetic modification.

=== Sterile Insect Technique (SIT) ===
Introducing large numbers of sterile males is another approach to reducing mosquito numbers. This is called Sterile Insect Technique (SIT). Radiation is used to disrupt DNA in the mosquitoes and randomly create mutations. Males with mutations that disrupt their fertility are selected and released in mass into the wild population. These sterile males mate with wild type females and no offspring is produced, reducing the population size.

==== Projects ====
Guangzhou, China - A combination of SIT with IIT, were used in a mosquito control program in Guangzhou, China. The pilot trial was carried out with the support of the IAEA in cooperation with the Food and Agriculture Organization of the United Nations (FAO). The pilot demonstrated the successful near-elimination of field populations of the world's most invasive mosquito species, Aedes albopictus (Asian tiger mosquito). The two-year trial (2016–2017) covered a 32.5-hectare area on two relatively isolated islands in the Pearl River in Guangzhou. It involved the release of about 200 million irradiated mass-reared adult male mosquitoes exposed to Wolbachia bacteria. The trial reported that this combined incompatible and sterile insect technique nearly eliminated local Aedes albopictus populations on the treated river islands

== Genetic modification ==
These techniques share the characteristic of introducing lethal genes and reducing the size of the mosquito population over time.

=== Growth inhibition ===
Another control approach under investigation for Aedes aegypti uses a strain that is genetically modified to require the antibiotic tetracycline to develop beyond the larval stage. Modified males develop normally in a nursery while they are supplied with this chemical and can be released into the wild. However, their subsequent offspring will lack tetracycline in the wild and never mature. Field trials were conducted in the Cayman Islands, Malaysia and Brazil to control the mosquitoes that cause dengue fever. In April 2014, Brazil's National Technical Commission for Biosecurity approved the commercial release of the modified mosquito. The FDA is the lead agency for regulating genetically-engineered mosquitoes in the United States. In 2014 and 2018 research was reported into other genetic methods including cytoplasmic incompatibility, chromosomal translocations, sex distortion and gene replacement. Although several years away from the field trial stage, if successful these other methods have the potential to be cheaper and to eradicate the Aedes aegypti mosquito more efficiently.

A pioneering experimental demonstration of the gene drive method eradicated small populations of Anopheles gambiae.

In 2020, Oxitec's non-biting Friendly Aedes aegypti mosquito was approved for release by the US EPA and Florida state authorities.

==== Projects ====
Malaysia - In several experiments, researchers released batches of male adult Aedes mosquitos with genetic modifications to study the effects of dispersal and reproduction in natural populations. Mosquito traps were ultilized for the purpose of these studies. The process allowed for the opportunity to determine which mosquitoes were affected, and provided a group to be re-released with genetic modifications resulting in the OX513A variant to reduce reproduction. Adult mosquitoes are attracted inside the traps where they died of dehydration.

=== Factor EOF1 ===
Research is being conducted that indicates that dismantling a protein associated with eggshell organization, factor EOF1 (factor 1), which may be unique to mosquitoes, may be a means to hamper their reproduction effectively in the wild without creating a resistant population or affecting other animals.

== Legal measures ==
In Singapore, under the Control of Vectors and Pesticides Act there is a legal duty on occupants to prevent Aedes mosquitos from breeding in their homes. If breeding mosquitos are found by inspectors, occupiers are subject to a fine of 5,000 Singapore dollars or imprisonment for a term not exceeding 3 months or both.

== Proposals to eradicate mosquitoes ==
Some biologists have proposed the deliberate extinction of certain mosquito species. Biologist Olivia Judson has advocated "specicide" of thirty mosquito species by introducing a genetic element which can insert itself into another crucial gene, to create recessive "knockout genes". She says that the Anopheles mosquitoes (which spread malaria) and Aedes mosquitoes (which spread dengue fever, yellow fever, elephantiasis, zika, and other diseases) represent only 30 out of some 3,500 mosquito species; eradicating these would save at least one million human lives per year, at a cost of reducing the genetic diversity of the family Culicidae by 1%. She further argues that since species become extinct "all the time" the disappearance of a few more will not destroy the ecosystem: "We're not left with a wasteland every time a species vanishes. Removing one species sometimes causes shifts in the populations of other species—but different need not mean worse." In addition, anti-malarial and mosquito control programs offer little realistic hope to the 300 million people in developing nations who will be infected with acute illnesses each year. Although trials are ongoing, she writes that if they fail: "We should consider the ultimate swatting."

Biologist E. O. Wilson has advocated the extinction of several species of mosquito, including malaria vector Anopheles gambiae. Wilson stated, "I'm talking about a very small number of species that have co-evolved with us and are preying on humans, so it would certainly be acceptable to remove them. I believe it's just common sense."

Insect ecologist Steven Juliano has argued that "it's difficult to see what the downside would be to removal, except for collateral damage". Entomologist Joe Conlon stated that "If we eradicated them tomorrow, the ecosystems where they are active will hiccup and then get on with life. Something better or worse would take over."

However, David Quammen has pointed out that mosquitoes protect forests from human exploitation and may act as competitors for other insects. In terms of malaria control, if populations of mosquitoes were temporarily reduced to zero in a region, then this would exterminate malaria, and the mosquito population could then be allowed to rebound.

== See also ==
- Bug zapper
- Chikungunya
- Fly-killing device
- Flying syringe
- Mosquito eater
- Mosquito laser
- Mosquito repellant
- Proposed planned extinction of mosquito species
- Vector control
- West Nile virus

== General references ==
- Chevillon, Christine; Raymond, Michel; Guillemaud, Thomas; Lenormand, Thomas; Pasteur, Nicole (1999). "Population genetics of insecticide resistance in the mosquito Culex pipiens". Biol. J. Linn. Soc. 68 (1–2): 147–57. doi:10.1111/j.1095-8312.1999.tb01163.x.
- Florida Coordinating Council on Mosquito Control (1998). Florida Mosquito Control: The State of the Mission as Defined by Mosquito Controllers, Regulators, and Environmental Managers (White Paper). University of Florida. Archived from the original on 20 June 2004.
- Durden, Lance A.; Mullen, Gary L. (2002). Medical and veterinary entomology. Boston: Academic Press. ISBN 978-0-12-510451-7.
- Service, M.W. (1993). Mosquito ecology: field sampling methods (2nd ed.). London: Elsevier Applied Science. ISBN 978-1-85166-798-7.
- Ware, George Whitaker (1994). The pesticide book (4th ed.). Fresno, CA: Thomson Publications. ISBN 978-0-913702-58-1.
- Walker, K. (April 2002). A review of control methods for African malaria vectors (PDF) (Activity Report). Vol. 108. U.S. Agency for International Development. Archived from the original (PDF) on 8 October 2006.
- Martinez, Julien et al. "Differential attraction in mosquito-human interactions and implications for disease control." Philosophical transactions of the Royal Society of London. Series B, Biological sciences vol. 376,1818 (2021): 20190811. doi:10.1098/rstb.2019.0811
- Connelly, C Roxanne, and Jeff Borchert. "MOSQUITO CONTROL EMERGENCY PREPAREDNESS AND RESPONSE TO NATURAL DISASTERS." Journal of the American Mosquito Control Association vol. 36,2 Suppl (2020): 2-4. doi:10.2987/8756- 971X-36.2S.2
- Connelly, C. Roxanne; Borchert, Jeff (1 June 2020). "Mosquito Control Emergency Preparedness and Response to Natural Disasters". Journal of the American Mosquito Control Association. 36 (2s): 2–4. doi:10.2987/8756-971x-36.2s.2. ISSN 8756-971X. PMC 7871406. PMID 33575685.
- Carlson, Douglas B et al. "Mosquito Control and Coastal Development: How they Have Coexisted and Matured in Florida and Australia." Journal of the American Mosquito Control Association vol. 35,2 (2019): 123-134. doi:10.2987/18-6807.1 * Carlson, Douglas B.; Dale, Pat E. R.; Kurucz, Nina; Dwyer, Patrick G.; Knight, Jon M.; Whelan, Peter I.; Richards, D. Diane (1 June 2019). "Mosquito Control and Coastal Development: How they Have Coexisted and Matured in Florida and Australia". Journal of the American Mosquito Control Association. 35 (2): 123–134. doi:10.2987/18-6807.1. hdl:10072/396593. ISSN 8756-971X. PMID 31442134.
