= Break-bone fever =

Break-bone fever may refer to

- Dengue fever
- Chikungunya virus disease, occasionally misidentified as dengue fever for hundreds of years
