= Ovitrap =

Mosquito population control device

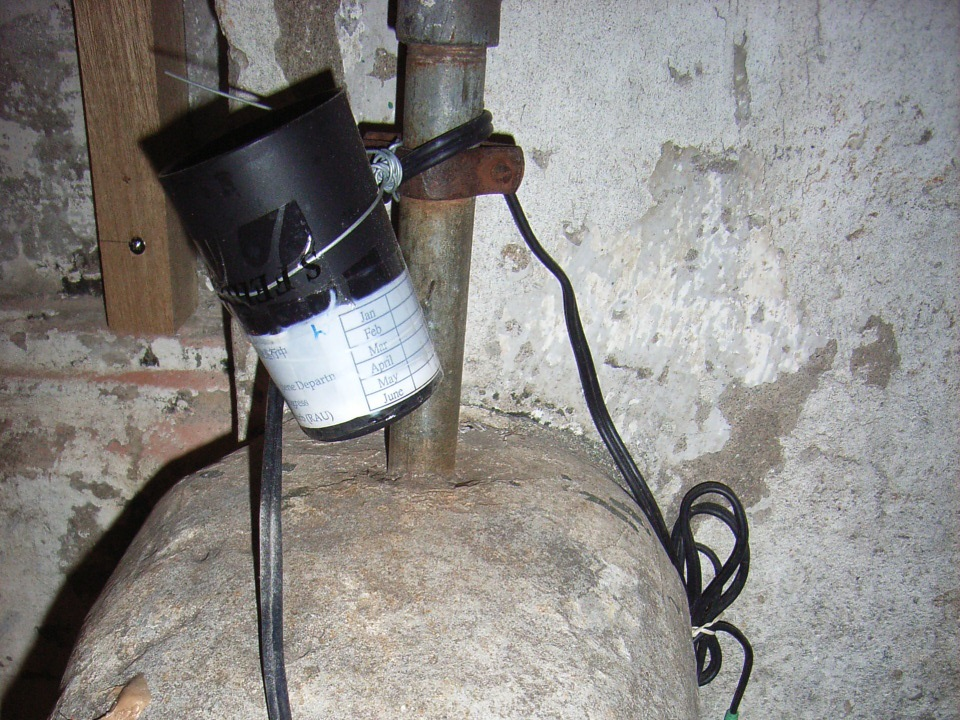
Ovitrap.

An ovitrap is a device which consists of a dark container topped with a mesh and containing water, and a substrate where mosquitoes can lay their eggs. The eggs then fall through the mesh into the water, where the larvae hatch and develop into pupas. When the adult mosquitoes emerge, they are trapped beneath the mesh and are unable to escape from the ovitrap. Ovitraps mimic the preferred breeding site for container breeding mosquitoes, including Aedes albopictus and Aedes aegypti.

== History ==
The ovitrap was first described in 1966 and was initially designed for monitoring Aedes populations. Researchers found that if they provided artificial breeding sites, they could easily collect and study the eggs found in the container. Since the original ovitrap was invented, lethal ovitraps have been developed, which kill the larvae and/or the adult mosquitoes that enter.

== Application ==
Ovitraps used for monitoring can detect Aedes mosquito populations, thus acting as an early warning signal to preempt disease outbreaks. Analysis can be done on the ovitrap breeding data collected weekly to identify mosquito breeding hotspots and risk areas when there is a danger of high Aedes infestation. This analysis is used to plan vector surveillance and control operations.

The extensive use of the ovitrap in a community can be used in Aedes population control and effectively reduce the Aedes population in that area. It has been used in countries like Singapore, the United States, and Hong Kong since the 1970s.
