= Chikungunya vaccine =

Medication

Vaccine description
- Target: Chikungunya virus
- Vaccine type: Attenuated

Clinical data
- Trade names: Ixchiq, others
- AHFS/Drugs.com: Monograph
- License data: US DailyMed: Chikungunya
- Routes of administration: Intramuscular
- ATC code: J07BP01 (WHO) J07BP02 (WHO)

Legal status
- Legal status: CA: ℞-only / Schedule D; UK: POM (Prescription only); US: ℞-only; EU: Rx-only

Identifiers
- DrugBank: DB18701

Chikungunya vaccines are vaccines intended to provide acquired immunity against the chikungunya virus. As of 2025, two vaccines have been licensed in some countries. These are Ixchiq, a live attenuated vaccine from Valneva, and Vimkunya manufactured by Bavarian Nordic which utilises virus-like particle technology.

The most commonly reported side effects of Ixchiq include tenderness at the injection site, as well as headache, fatigue, muscle pain, joint pain, fever, and nausea. However the license for Ixchiq has been suspended or restricted in some countries due to the risk of severe side effects, particularly in older people.

== Medical uses ==
The chikungunya vaccine is indicated for the prevention of disease caused by chikungunya virus. In the European Union, use of the live attenuated vaccine (Ixchiq) has been restricted to individuals with a high risk of becoming infected with the chikungunya virus. This restriction is due to safety concerns resulting from side effects of the vaccince.

== History ==
In November 2023, the US Food and Drug Administration (FDA) granted the application for the chikungunya vaccine with fast track, breakthrough therapy, and priority review designations. The vaccine, Ixchiq, was licensed to Valneva Austria GmbH. It contains the live attenuated chikungunya virus (CHIKV) Δ5nsP3 strain of the ECSA/IOL genotype.

Ixchiq was authorized for medical use in the European Union in June 2024. A second vaccine, Vimkunya, manufactured by Bavarian Nordic, was authorized for medical use in the European Union in February 2025. In June 2026, the European Medicines Agency (EMA) recommended that the chikungunya vaccine Ixchiq should be restricted to individuals with a high risk of becoming infected with the chikungunya virus. This restriction is due to serious adverse events reported with the vaccine, including aseptic meningitis. Some of these events resulted in hospitalisation and death.
