= Ovillanta =

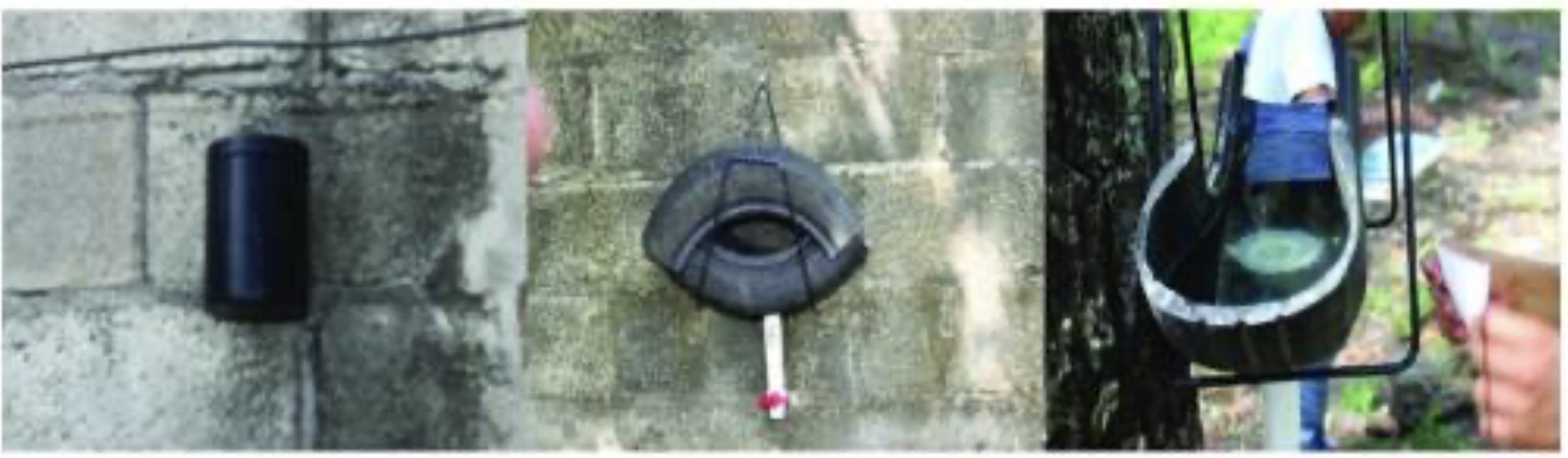
Ovillanta

An ovillanta is a type of mosquito trap designed by researchers at Laurentian University in Ontario, Canada, and tested in cooperation with the Ministry of Health in Guatemala and with researchers in Mexico. The simple, low-cost trap allows efficient collection and disposal of mosquito eggs and larvae.

== History ==
Laurentian University professor Gerardo Ulibarri, who has been studying ways to reduce numbers of mosquitoes since 2003, and had previously developed other types of mosquito control devices, began a study locally to find a way to reduce numbers of Culex mosquitoes which spread West Nile virus and other diseases. Ulibarri and his fellow researchers designed an inexpensive trap that they called an ovillanta. Preliminary studies showed that this type of trap can attract about seven times as many mosquito eggs as a conventional ovitrap, especially when more than one ovillanta are used in close proximity, which might be due to the characteristic skip-oviposition behaviour (depositing a small number of eggs over many sites) of Aedes spp.

A ten-month follow-up study was conducted in northern Guatemala, where Dengue fever spread by Aedes aegypti mosquitoes is a serious health problem, and where Zika virus may soon arrive. The study was funded by a Stars in Global Health grant from the Canadian government's Grand Challenges Canada program, and was conducting along with researchers from Mexico and with the Guatemala Ministry of Health. Results of the study were reported in 2016 and showed that the traps were particularly effective during the dry season when alternate egg-laying sites were scarce.

== Trap design ==
The design for the trap was released in 2016. Each trap costs less than $4.00CAN to make.

The trap is constructed from sections of discarded rubber tire into which a valve drain has been installed. It is partly filled with attractant-laced water. Various plant or food-based lures may be used as the attractant. The lure trialed in Guatamela was a milk-based, non-toxic commercially-available solution called "AE Lure". A 2021 field trial in India used hay-infused water. Mosquitoes lay eggs on a piece of paper, or other porous material, floating on the water. At regular intervals the water is run through a filter and the paper replaced to remove any deposited eggs and larva. The water is then re-used, because mosquitoes release an oviposition pheromone when they lay eggs, and other egg-bearing mosquitoes are attracted to water which contains this pheromone.
