= Lethal ovitrap =

Mosquito-killing trap

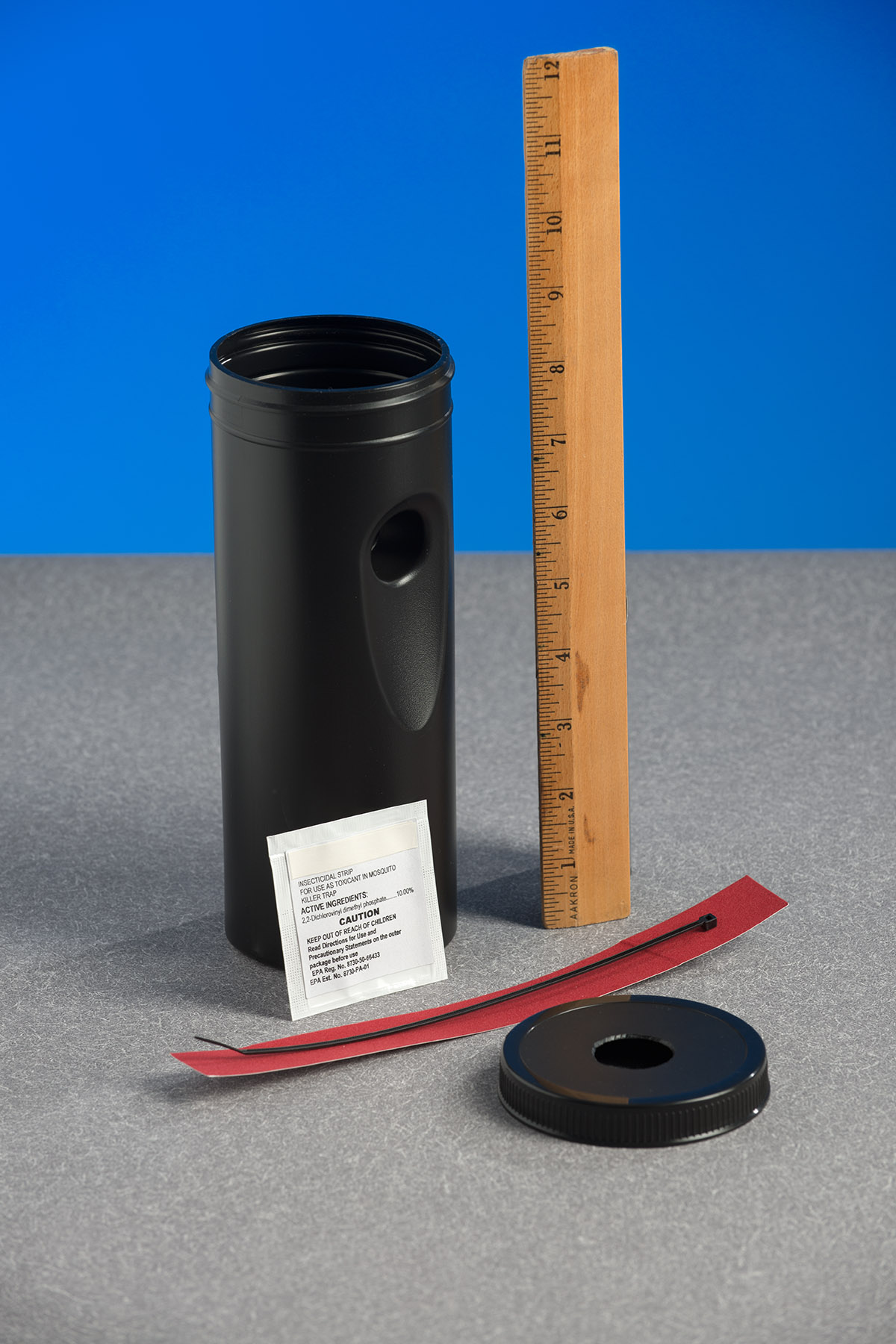
The lethal ovitrap is filled with water and the velour paper landing strip and a pesticide-treated strip from the white packet are attached to the trap. The female mosquito lands on the velour strip to lay eggs and receives a lethal dose of pesticide.

A lethal ovitrap is a device which attracts gravid female container-breeding mosquitoes and kills them. The traps halt the insect's life cycle by killing adult insects and stopping reproduction. The original use of ovitraps was to monitor the spread and density of Aedes and other container-breeding mosquito populations by collecting eggs which could be counted, or hatched to identify the types of insects. Since its conception, researchers found that adding lethal substances to the ovitraps could control the populations of these targeted species. These traps are called lethal ovitraps. They primarily target Aedes aegypti and Aedes albopictus mosquitoes, which are the main vectors of dengue fever, Zika virus, west Nile virus, yellow fever, and chikungunya.

Lethal ovitraps can either contain substances that kills larvae that hatch from eggs laid in the traps (larvicidal ovitraps), or substances that kill the adult mosquito when she enters, along with any larva that may hatch (adulticidal ovitraps). While larvicidal ovitraps only reduce larval growth, they do not kill the adult mosquitoes that may carry diseases. Adulticidal ovitraps act to kill the viremic (disease-carrying) female mosquitoes and act to directly stop disease transmission.

Lethal ovitraps use tiny amounts of pesticides, usually 99.9% less chemicals than applied using traditional spraying or “fogging”. They provide isolated spaces where mosquitoes, not humans and other wildlife, will find these pesticides, instead of broadcasting them into the environment. Harsher pesticides with less mosquito resistance can be used in these traps because the spaces are so isolated. This allows for better mosquito control with less pesticide use.

== How it works ==
These dark, water-filled containers mimic the breeding site of container-breeding mosquitoes including the Aedes species. They prefer to lay their eggs in small human-made containers that hold standing water including rain buckets, flower pots, old tires, gutters, the leaf axils of plants, and even discarded bottles, cans, and other trash. These mosquitoes may visit on average 12 or more sites per egg-laying cycle in an act called "skip-oviposition". This ensures as many eggs as possible will survive if the breeding sites are damaged or dried up. Because these mosquitoes jump from breeding site to breeding site, the chances that they will find an ovitrap are extremely high, almost certain if enough ovitraps are placed around natural breeding sites.

== Lethal ovitraps in the United States ==
In the 1990s, U.S. military research scientists Michael Perich of the Walter Reed Army Institute of Research and Brian Zeichner of the U.S. Army Center for Health Promotion and Preventive Medicine, now called the U.S. Army Public Health Center, developed the Lethal Mosquito Breeding Container. The U.S. Army patented the Lethal Mosquito Breeding Container in 1999; the patent expired in 2017. In 2008, the US Army licensed the technology to SpringStar Inc., a manufacturing company located in Washington. SpringStar® then registered the product under the brand name of Trap-N-Kill®, which is for sale in some states in the US. Another lethal ovitrap available in the United States is the BG-GAT from the company Biogents. This trap type was developed by mosquito scientists from the Federal University of Minas Gerais in Brasil and the James Cook University in Australia. This trap type has recently been successfully used to reduce Asian tiger mosquito biting pressure in a neighborhood project in University Park, MD, which was supervised by scientists from Rutgers University.

== Applications of Copper in Ovitraps ==
Ovitraps are used in mosquito control campaigns to target the larval stage of mosquitoes. The application of copper-based ovitraps offers a cost-effective alternative to traditional larvicides, particularly in resource-limited settings. Copper, known for its larvicidal properties, has been tested in field settings to determine its effectiveness and practicality for mosquito control.

== Use in disease prevention ==
Ovitraps target A. aegypti and A. albopictus mosquitoes which are carriers of dengue fever, yellow fever, zika virus, west Nile virus, and chikungunya. These mosquitoes are found throughout Southeast Asia, Australia, Africa, Southern Europe, South and Central America, and the South and Eastern parts of the United States.

Some countries use ovitraps to monitor the spread of the Aedes mosquitoes to determine to where these diseases could spread. Lethal ovitraps have been used in field studies to show their effectiveness in reducing mosquito populations below disease-transmission thresholds. When referencing lethal ovitraps, the World Health Organization states, “Studies have shown that population densities can be reduced with sufficiently large numbers of frequently serviced traps. Life expectancy of the vector may also potentially be shortened, thus reducing the number of vectors that become infective”.

The Queensland Health Department effectively uses lethal ovitraps as a part of their dengue action response team protocol. They state, “Operational use of this strategy to combat dengue outbreaks in Cairns and the Torres Strait suggests that large scale, or annihilation, ovitrapping is effective (e.g. Lethal ovitraps and yard inspections on Thursday Island, reduced dengue mosquito populations by 92%, and dengue transmission ceased)”.

The Philippines also uses a larvicidal ovitrap in their dengue prevention programs. Although these traps only kill the larvae, they have shown significant impacts in dengue transmission levels. The Philippines Department of Science and Technology website describes one region with a 97% reduction in dengue cases (1,087 cases and 16 deaths in 2010, to 36 cases in 2011), and second region which saw a drop in dengue cases among school children from 210 in 2010 to zero in 2011.

In 2001, Brazil tested ovitraps in field studies and found that test areas had reduced populations of Aedes compared to control areas. Thailand ran a program that deployed mosquito control tools to communities, including lethal ovitraps for their yards and homes. The program was met with great success, “One year after the interventions, the dengue fever rates were zero in the community dengue control program versus 322 per 100,000 in an untreated reference community. The percentage of lethal ovitraps with eggs decreased from 66% to 10% in the integrated management program, indicating that the population of Ae. aegypti adult females was significantly reduced”.

Other field studies have been performed in Peru, Bangladesh, Singapore, and other countries, but the technology is still not widely used for mosquito control. Pesticide spraying still remains the preferred mosquito population control method.
