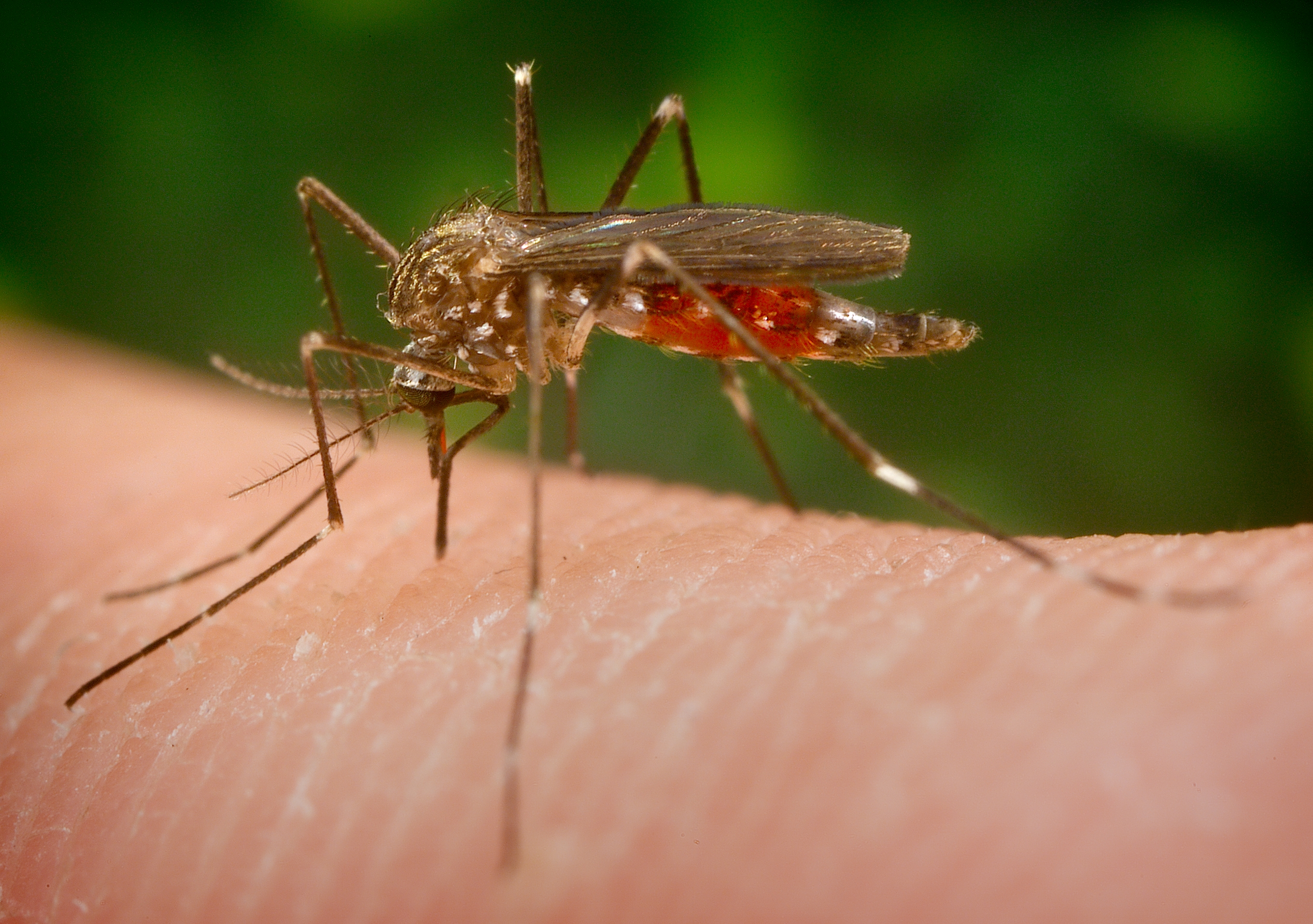

Scientific classification
- Kingdom: Animalia
- Phylum: Arthropoda
- Clade: Pancrustacea
- Class: Insecta
- Order: Diptera
- Family: Culicidae
- Genus: Aedes
- Subgenus: Hulecoeteomyia
- Species: A. japonicus

Binomial name
- Aedes japonicus (Theobald, 1901)

= Aedes japonicus =

Species of mosquito

Aedes japonicus, commonly known as the Asian bush mosquito or the Asian rock pool mosquito, was first described by Theobald in 1901 from Tokyo, Japan. They are competent arbovirus vectors known to transmit the West Nile virus as well as Japanese and St. Louis encephalitis. They are listed as an invasive species by the Global Invasive Species Database.

== Bionomics ==
Adults live in forested areas and are day biters, but are apparently reluctant to bite humans. In the laboratory, they feed on chicks and mice but not on reptiles or amphibians. Larvae occur in a wide variety of natural and artificial water retainers such as tree holes and rock holes, usually preferring shaded places and water rich in organic matter. They are found from early spring to early autumn in their native habitat of Central Japan. They overwinter as eggs in cooler regions and larvae in warmer regions.

== Subspecies ==
There a four known subspecies:

- Aedes japonicus japonicus Theobald, 1901
- Aedes japonicus shintienensis Tsai & Lien, 1950
- Aedes japonicus amamiensis Tanaka, Mizusawa & Saugstad, 1979
- Aedes japonicus yaeyamensis Tanaka, Mizusawa & Saugstad, 1979

== Description ==
Adults have a distinctive bronze-colored, lyre-shaped pattern on the scutum, and larvae have a linear arrangement of branched frontal setae and a strongly spiculated anal saddle.

== Distribution ==
Aedes japonicus is native to Eastern Asia and can be found in Taiwan, Hong Kong, Japan, and parts of Russia, China, and the Korean Peninsula. Additionally, they have invaded and colonized North and South America as well as Europe. It was first recorded in New York and New Jersey in 1998, and has been spotted as far west as Vancouver Island. Its range is expected to eventually include much of North America, Central America, Europe, Asia, and parts of Hawaii. A distribution model developed for Germany predicted that A. japonicus will continue to expand across Germany even as the climate continues to change. Another model that studied A. japonicus in North America predicted it to continue its invasion into the Southern United States with the possibility of reaching island nations such as Jamaica and Cuba. Both models suggest that the invasion will likely be a rapid affair.

== Habitat ==
Larval habitats are often established in rock pools near streams as well as container habitats that provide adequate moisture such as buckets, tree holes, and the insides of tires. Their large variety of colonizable habitats has been shown to negatively impact native species through displacement, competition, and disease spreading capabilities. Adult mosquitoes prefer temperate climates with mortality rates rising around 28°C (82.5°F) and can survive cold conditions by entering diapause in the egg stage.

== Life cycle ==
Aedes japonicus are multivoltine and oviposit 2 – 3 times per gonotrophic cycle, producing a mean of 114 ± 51 eggs per female. The eggs are resistant to desiccation and if temperatures are low then the eggs will enter the prediapause stage where its responsive to environmental based cues that cause it to enter diapause at the pharate first instar. In Northern Europe diapause is indispensable to survive cold winter temperatures; 50% of eggs enter in diapause by the end of summer, leading to an average calculated maternal critical photoperiod of 13 h. Larvae of A. japonicus are active as soon as early spring in snowy spring waters, notably the only mosquito to do so and is likely key to their invasive success.

== Medical importance ==
Because A. japonicus have the ability to transfer arboviruses they have quickly become of medical import and a public health concern. They are capable of experimental transmission of West Nile virus and is considered to be an active vector of West Nile virus disease with its associated syndromes. Its interactions with other known disease vectors give it the potential to influence the ecology of other vector-borne diseases. Research has shown that Japanese Encephalitis Virus and West Nile virus have different infection rates depending on genetic background of the mosquito. A possible way to reduce both the invasiveness and health concern that they pose is to implement a biocontrol through parasitic water mites (Acari: Hydrachnidae). The mites have been shown to reduce fecundity and thus may represent a way to reduce mosquito populations.
