= 2013–2014 Zika virus outbreaks in Oceania =

Series of disease outbreaks in Oceania

In October 2013, there was an outbreak of Zika fever in French Polynesia, the first outbreak of several Zika outbreaks across Oceania. With 8,723 cases reported, it was the largest outbreak of Zika fever before the outbreak in the Americas that began in April 2015. An earlier outbreak occurred on Yap Island in the Federated States of Micronesia in 2007, but it is thought that the 2013–2014 outbreak involved an independent introduction of the Zika virus from Southeast Asia.

Investigators suggested that the outbreaks of mosquito-borne diseases in the Pacific from 2012 to 2014 were "the early stages of a wave that will continue for several years", particularly because of their vulnerability to infectious diseases stemming from isolation and immunologically naive populations.

The outbreaks spread across several island groups in the region. Following the initial French Polynesia outbreak, Zika spread to New Caledonia in late 2013 and reached the Cook Islands and Easter Island by early 2014. Subsequent cases were confirmed in the Solomon Islands, Vanuatu, and the Polynesia islands of American Samoa, Samoa, Tonga, and the Marshall Islands by 2015.

The Zika virus in Oceania was primarily transmitted by Aedes mosquitoes, particularly Aedes aegypti. A concurrent increase in neurological syndromes and autoimmune complications, including Guillain–Barré syndrome, was reported during the French Polynesia outbreak, and health authorities later noted an unusual rise in central nervous system malformations in fetuses and infants coinciding with the outbreak. Brazilian researchers have suggested that the Zika virus was subsequently introduced into Brazil from French Polynesia, contributing to the broader epidemic that began in 2015.

== Epidemiology ==
=== French Polynesia ===
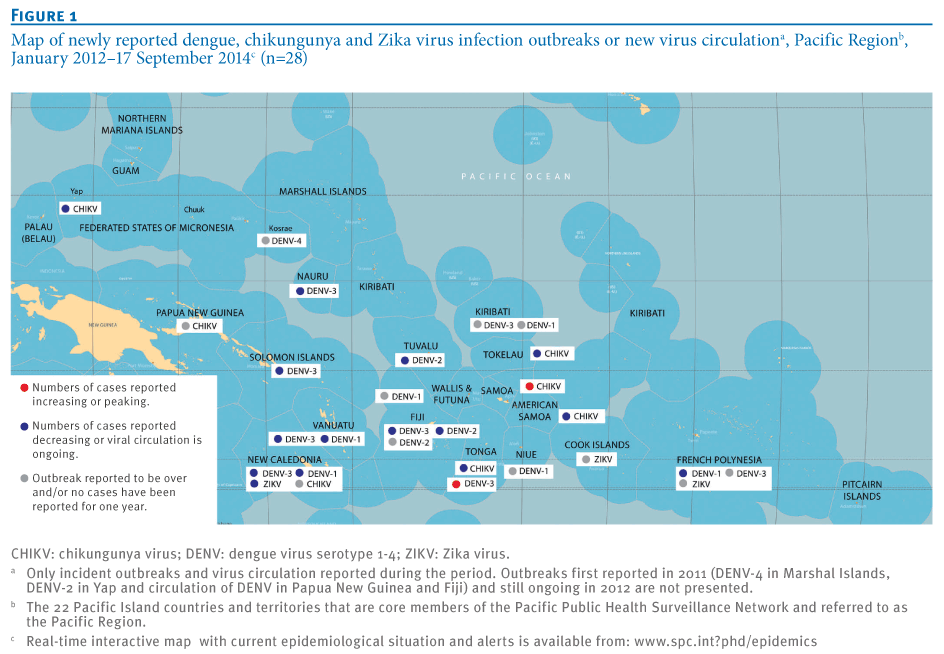
Outbreaks of Zika virus, dengue and chikungunya in Oceania from January 2012 to September 2014.

The first Zika outbreak started in French Polynesia in October 2013, with cases reported in the Society, Marquesas and Tuamotu Islands on Tahiti, Mo'orea, Raiatea, Tahaa, Bora Bora, Nuku Hiva and Arutua. The outbreak ran concurrently with an outbreak of dengue fever.

In December 2013, an American traveler to Mo'orea was diagnosed with Zika virus infection in New York after an 11-day history of symptoms, becoming the first American tourist to be diagnosed with Zika. A Japanese tourist returning to Japan was also diagnosed with Zika virus infection by the National Institute of Infectious Diseases after visiting Bora Bora, becoming the first imported case of Zika fever in Japan.

By February 2014, it was estimated that more than 29,000 people with Zika-like symptoms had sought medical care, roughly 11.5% of the population, with 8,503 suspected cases. Of 746 samples tested at the Institut Louis-Malardé in Tahiti by 7 February, 396 (53.1%) were confirmed as containing the Zika virus by RT-PCR. Two further cases of Zika virus infection were imported into Japan, and on 25 February, the Norwegian Institute of Public Health reported that a traveler returning to Norway from Tahiti was confirmed to have a Zika virus infection.

By March 2014, the outbreak was declining in the majority of the islands, and by October the outbreak had abated. A total of 8,723 suspected cases of Zika virus infection were reported, as well as more than 30,000 estimated clinical visits and medical consultations due to concerns about Zika. The true number of Zika cases was estimated at more than 30,000.

=== New Caledonia ===
Zika spread westwards from French Polynesia to New Caledonia, where imported cases from French Polynesia were reported from November 2013 onwards. The first indigenous case was confirmed in January 2014 by the Pasteur Institute. On 10 February, there were 64 reported cases of Zika in the communities of Greater Nouméa, Dumbéa, and Ouvéa, of which 30 were imported from French Polynesia. By 26 February 2014, there were 140 confirmed cases of Zika in New Caledonia, including 32 imported cases. The outbreak peaked in April, and by 17 September, the number of confirmed cases had gone up to 1,400, of which 35 were imported. During the same time period, there were also outbreaks of chikungunya fever and dengue fever.

=== Cook Islands ===
In February 2014, an outbreak of Zika was reported in the Cook Islands, to the southwest of French Polynesia. In March, an Australian woman was diagnosed with a Zika virus infection by Queensland Health following a recent trip to the Cook Islands, becoming the second reported case of Zika diagnosed in Australia. Nearly 40 other cases of Zika virus infection were imported into New Zealand. By 29 May, the outbreak had ended, with 50 confirmed and 932 suspected cases of Zika virus infection.

=== Easter Island ===
By March 2014, there were one confirmed and 40 suspected cases of Zika virus infection on Easter Island. The Zika virus was suspected to have been carried to the island by a tourist from French Polynesia during the annual Tapati festival, held between January and February. Chilean health authorities decided against issuing an health alert, saying that the outbreak had been contained and was under control, and advised travelers to take precautions against mosquito bites. By the end of the year, 173 cases of Zika had been reported, but all of the cases were described as "mild".

On 24 September 2014, a Belgian woman flying to Easter Island from Tahiti was diagnosed with Zika virus infection after having previously received ambulatory care in Tahiti, and was taken to Hanga Roa Hospital for evaluation. LAN Airlines undertook operations to ensure other people on the woman's flight were not infected, and local health authorities stated that Zika was not a risk for people on the island.

== Transmission ==
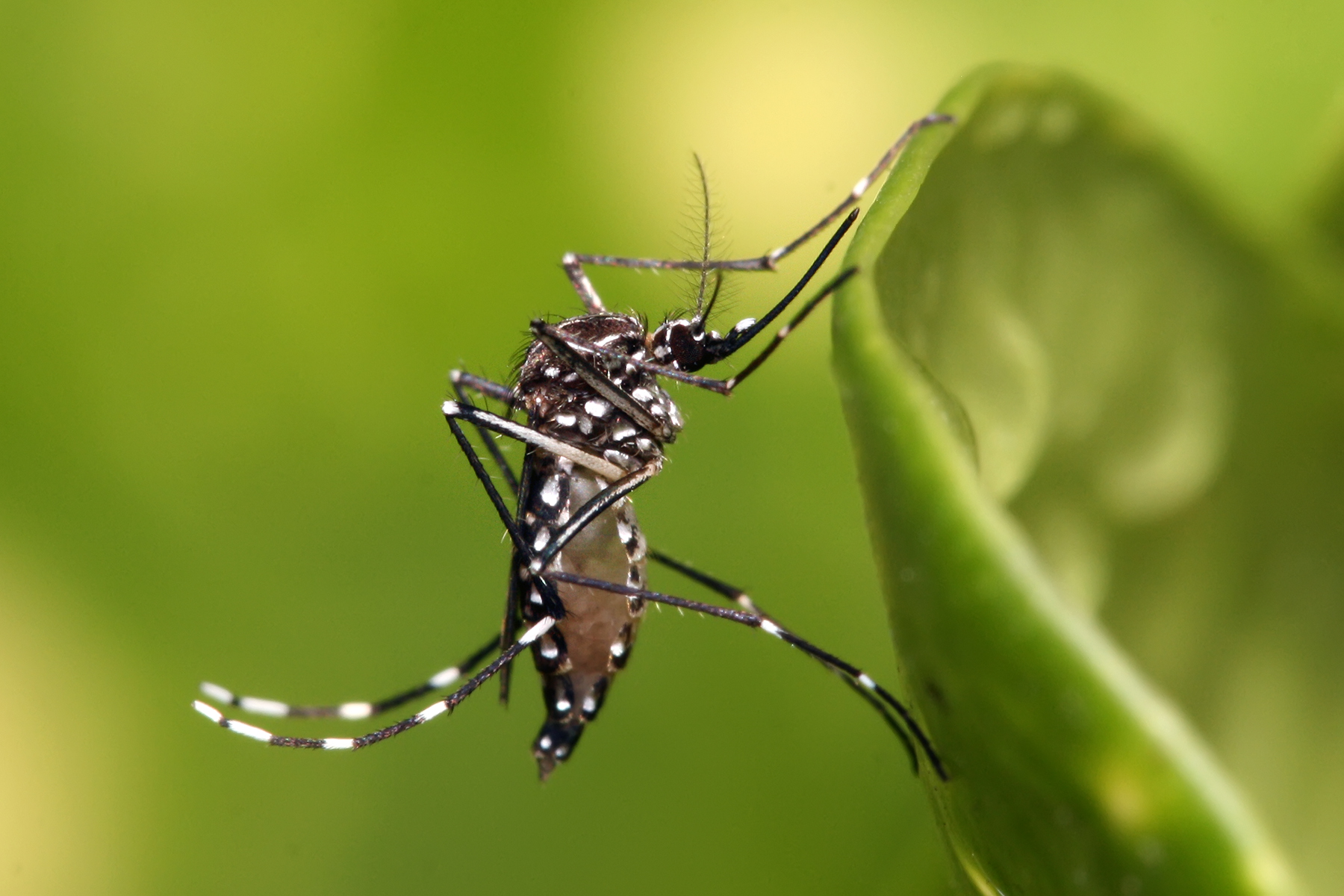
Adult Aedes aegypti mosquito, a vector or carrier of the Zika virus

Zika is a mosquito-borne disease. Four aedine species of mosquito are found in the Pacific, including Aedes aegypti, widespread across the South Pacific, and Aedes polynesiensis, found between Fiji and French Polynesia. Aedes aegypti has previous been identified as a wild vector of the Zika virus, and preliminary results from the Institut Louis-Malardé have supported the main role of Aedes aegypti and probable role of Aedes polynesiensis in spreading the Zika virus.

People infected with the Zika virus traveling to other Pacific islands could transmit the disease to local mosquitoes that bit them. The infected mosquitoes could then go on to spread Zika among the local mosquito population, and thence cause outbreaks of Zika among local people.

A study conducted between November 2013 and February 2014 in French Polynesia found that 2.8% of blood donors tested positive for the Zika virus, of which 3% were asymptomatic at the time of blood donation. 11 of the infected donors studied subsequently reported symptoms of Zika virus infection within 10 days. This indicated a potential risk of transmission of the Zika virus through blood transfusions, but there are no confirmed cases of this occurring. Nucleic acid testing of blood donors was implemented in French Polynesia from 13 January 2014 onwards to prevent unintended transmission of the Zika virus.

== Possible links to neurological syndromes, infant microcephaly and other disorders ==
A concurrent increase in neurological syndromes and autoimmune complications was first reported in early 2014. Of the 8,723 cases of Zika reported in French Polynesia, complications related to neurological signs of infection were noted in 74 people, including Guillain–Barré syndrome (GBS) in 42 people, as well as encephalitis, meningoencephalitis, paraesthesia, facial paralysis or myelitis in 25. However, there was only one laboratory confirmation of Zika virus infection using RT-PCR in patients with GBS. Among the initial 38 cases of GBS found in suspected Zika cases, 73% were male and infected individuals were aged between 27 and 70. This was highly unusual, as prior to the Zika outbreak there had only been 21 cases of GBS in French Polynesia between 2009 and 2012. 18 people newly diagnosed with GBS were admitted to the local rehabilitation centre, putting heavy strain on the limited intensive care resources available.

On 24 November 2015, health authorities in French Polynesia reported that there had been an unusual increase in the number of cases of central nervous system malformations in fetuses and infants during 2014–2015, coinciding with the outbreak of Zika on the islands. These malformations included 12 with fetal cerebral malformations or polymalformative syndromes, which includes microcephaly, and another five with brainstem dysfunction and absence of swallowing, much greater than the annual average of one case. None of the pregnant women involved had medical signs of Zika virus infection, but four who were tested gave positive results in IgG serology assays for flaviviruses, suggesting an asymptomatic Zika virus infection during pregnancy. French Polynesian health authorities hypothesise that these abnormalities are associated with Zika if pregnant women are infected during the first or second trimester of pregnancy. Dr. Didier Musso, an infectious disease specialist at the Institut Louis-Malardé, said that there was "very high suspicion" of a link between microcephaly and the Zika virus outbreak in French Polynesia, but added that further research was still needed.

The two cases of Zika virus infection imported into Japan from French Polynesia in February 2014 showed signs of leukopenia (decreased levels of white blood cells) and moderate thrombocytopenia (decreased levels of platelets).

== Aftermath ==
Brazilian researchers have suggested that a traveler infected with the Zika virus arrived in Brazil from French Polynesia, leading to the ongoing Zika virus outbreak that began in 2015. This may have occurred during the 2014 FIFA World Cup tournament, or shortly after, based on phylogenetic DNA analysis of the virus. French researchers have speculated that the virus arrived in August 2014, when canoeing teams from French Polynesia, New Caledonia, the Cook Islands and Easter Island attended the Va'a World Sprint Championships in Rio de Janeiro.

Between 1 January and 20 May 2015, a further 82 confirmed cases of Zika were reported in New Caledonia, including ten imported cases.

In early 2015, two cases of Zika virus infection were reported in travelers returning to Italy from French Polynesia.

In February 2015, an outbreak of Zika began in the Solomon Islands. The Ministry of Health and Medical Services reported the first laboratory confirmation of Zika virus infection on 12 March 2015, and by 3 May 302 cases of Zika had been reported, with the number of new cases steadily decreasing.

On 27 April 2015, the Ministry of Health of Vanuatu announced that blood samples collected prior to Cyclone Pam in March were confirmed to contain the Zika virus. The Ministry of Health advised people to consult medical aid if they experienced a high fever with no obvious cause, and recommended communities clean up places where mosquitoes could lay eggs. The introduction of the Zika virus was thought to be linked to frequent travel between New Caledonia and Vanuatu.

Local transmission of the Zika virus by mosquitoes has been reported in the Polynesian islands of American Samoa, Samoa, and Tonga since November 2015. Cases of Zika virus infection have subsequently been confirmed in American Samoa, Samoa, Tonga, and the Marshall Islands.

== See also ==
- 2015–16 Zika virus epidemic
- 2011–15 chikungunya outbreaks in Oceania
- Zika virus outbreak timeline
