= Healthcare in the British Virgin Islands =

Peebles Hospital is the main public hospital in the British Virgin Islands.

Healthcare in the British Virgin Islands is predominantly provided by private healthcare providers with an overlay of public support. There is a single public hospital in the British Virgin Islands - Peebles Hospital in Road Town on Tortola. There is also one private hospital - the Bougainvillea clinic (also in Road Town). On Anegada, Virgin Gorda and Jost Van Dyke, there are day clinics to serve non-emergency medical needs of residents of those islands. Although there is periodic discussion about the possibility of building another hospital on Virgin Gorda, to date there has been no commitment to doing so. For emergency medical evacuations from other islands a boat is maintained.

Under the Public Hospital Ordinance (Cap 195) free medical treatment is available at all public facilities to the elderly (being persons who are 65 or older), children (being persons aged 16 or under), police officers, firemen, prison officers, public health workers, the mentally ill, indigent persons and prisoners. All other persons must pay for medical treatment received from public health care facilities, although the cost of health care is usually less expensive than from private health care providers.

== Administration ==
The responsibility of operating the public health system is vested in a statutory body, the BVI Health Services Authority Board (BVI HSA). Peebles Hospital and the various clinics managed by the BVI HSA.

Public health care is effectively subsidised by pricing which is deliberately set below the actual cost of providing care. User fees are estimated to recover just 8% of the operating costs of primary and secondary health care services.

Expenditure on health accounts for approximately 17% of total government expenditure.

== Regulation ==
All practising physicians are required to be registered under Medical Act, 2000. The legislation covers doctors, dentists, related health care professionals and pharmacists. Nursing professionals are separately regulated under the Nursing Act, 1976.

== Overseas health care ==
Because of limited resources and problems of economies of scale, public health authorities will sometimes send critical cases overseas for treatment at larger facilities. In addition, many residents of the British Virgin Islands maintain private health insurance which allows them to access health care services in the United States.

== Territorial health issues ==
Obesity, hypertension and diabetes are amongst the most prevalent of routine health issues in the British Virgin Islands. The British Virgin Islands also suffers from periodic outbreaks of Dengue fever, and was also heavily affected by the 2013–14 chikungunya outbreak.

== Social Security ==
The British Virgin Islands operates a mandatory social security scheme. In practice because of the large number of migrant workers who leave the Territory before claiming benefits, the scheme is heavily over funded. Social security benefits include maternity, occupational injury, sickness and survivor's benefits. The Social Security Board (SSB) also has the ability to make ex gratia payments in case of need for uninsured persons requiring serious medical care.

== National Health Insurance ==
Since approximately 2005 various British Virgin Islands governments have considered and commissioned studies into a proposed National Health Insurance (NHI) system. The concept has broad cross party support, and is seen as a way of alleviating the cash-drain caused by underwriting public health expenditure. However, the proposal remains controversial amongst the public, not least because of the perceived cost to the public in a country with traditionally low tax burdens.

Legislation was implemented to bring NHI into effect in 2014. Although the most recently proposal was for NHI to come into effect in October 2014, this did not happen. Implementation was pushed back first to January 2015, and then to September 2015. The most recent announcements have been to the effect that registration of persons will commence on 1 September 2015, and the scheme itself would come into effect on 1 January 2016.

NHI will be administered by the Social Security Board. The deputy director with responsibility for NHI is Mr Roy Barry.

NHI is intended to be funded by a mandatory 7.5% levy on salaries paid to person employed in the British Virgin Islands up to a capped amount of US$5,791.50 per person. Half of this amount would be assessed against the employee and half against the employer. Where a person is married to a non-working spouse, they will be required to pay a contribution on behalf of their spouse as if the non-working spouse was paid the same salary as the working spouse (i.e. a working spouse will effectively pay double if their partner does not work).

Treatment received under NHI will be subject to a lifetime cap of US$1,000,000 in treatment, and will remain subject to a co-pay requirement. Proposed co-pays are:

- 0% at community health clinics
- 5% at the public hospital
- 10% at private clinics in network
- 40% at private clinics out of network (with a US$100 deductible)
- 20% at overseas clinics in network (with a US$500 deductible)
- 40% at overseas clinics out of network (needs to be pre-approved by Medical Review Committee)
