= Zika Authorization Plan Act of 2016 =

- Long title: To amend the Public Health Service Act to reauthorize a program to prevent and control mosquito-borne diseases.

Codification
- Titles amended: 42 U.S.C. 247b-21

Legislative history
- Introduced in the House as H.R. 4562 by Curt Clawson on February 12, 2016; Committee consideration by House Committee on Energy and Commerce

The Zika Authorization Plan Act of 2016 (H.R. 4562) was a bill introduced in the second session of the United States 114th Congress by Representative Curt Clawson (R-FL) on February 12, 2016. The bill was prompted by the Zika virus health scare and was aimed at reducing the spread of the virus.

As introduced, the official title was "To amend the Public Health Service Act to reauthorize a program to prevent and control mosquito-borne diseases."

In early August 2016, the state of Florida was the first state in the U.S. to "report cases of localized transmission of the Zika virus."

While working overseas before becoming a Member of Congress, Clawson contracted dengue fever from a mosquito bite.

== Legislative background ==
During a deadlock in Congress over additional funding for the Zika virus, Congressman Clawson introduced the legislation.

At the time Clawson introduced the bill, there had been at least 600 virus cases in Florida. In addition to H.R. 4562, in the summer of 2016, Clawson said he would introduce another piece of legislation appropriating $1.1 billion to fight Zika.

"The explosive spread of this mosquito-borne virus, exacerbated by a lack of vaccines and reliable diagnostic tests, must be curbed utilizing every tool at our disposal in a coordinated international response," Clawson said. "The Zika virus is sneaking up on us and we're not paying enough attention. If we deal with it prior to an outbreak we will be much better off."

== Zika grants ==
At the end of 2016, the U.S. Centers for Disease Control and Prevention (CDC) awarded $184 million in funding to states, territories, local jurisdictions and universities to protect people from the spread of the Zika virus. The awards were given as a part of $350 million in funding provided to the CDC under legislation passed by Congress called the Zika Response and Preparedness Appropriations Act of 2016.

== Legislative details ==
This bill would have amended the Public Health Service Act to reauthorize grants for state mosquito control programs through FY2020.

The bill would authorize $200 million per year for each fiscal year 2016 through 2020 for grants for state mosquito programs. Specifically, the bill amended Subsection (f) of section 317S of the Public Health Service Act (42 U.S.C. 247b–21(f)) as follows:

"(f) Authorization Of Appropriations.—To carry out this section, there is authorized to be appropriated $200,000,000 for each of fiscal years 2016 through 2020".

== Legislative history ==
The bill was introduced in the House on February 12, 2016. It was referred to the House Committee on Energy and Commerce, where it was then referred to the Subcommittee on Health.

The bill had a total of 8 cosponsors. The two original cosponsors (Members of Congress who signed on when the bill was introduced) were Patrick Murphy (D-FL) and Ileana Ros-Lehtinen (R-FL). Other cosponsors (Members who signed on after the bill was introduced) were Stacey Plaskett (D-Virgin Islands), Eric Swalwell (D-CA), Blake Farenthold (R-TX), Gwen Graham (D-FL), Brad Sherman (D-CA), and David Cicilline (D-RI).

== Subsequent legislation ==
In August 2016, Clawson introduced a separate piece of legislation "to fund $1.1 billion worth of Zika prevention programs both domestically and globally."

According to Homeland Preparedness News, Clawson warned that the virus outbreak will grow faster in Florida with each passing day the Congress does not act.

"Now is not the time for partisanship, it is time for governing and doing the right thing for Florida and the nation," he said. "America has the most advanced healthcare facilities in the world and must use all resources at its disposal to create a vaccine for this virus. It is time for members to pull all levers in both chambers of Congress to get a funding measure to the president's desk."

== See also ==
- 2015–16 Zika virus epidemic
- Zika virus outbreak timeline
