= 2007 Yap Islands Zika virus outbreak =

Disease outbreak in the Federated States of Micronesia

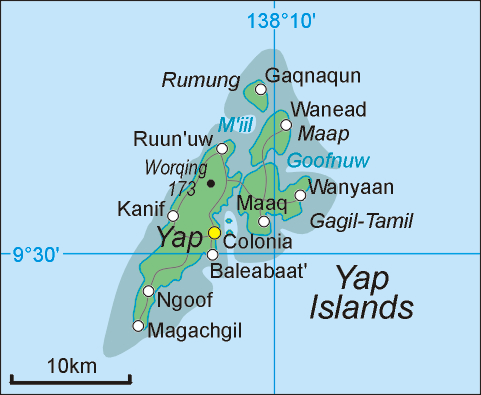
- The Yap Islands in the Pacific Ocean, with a land area of 100.2 square kilometres (38.7 sq mi) and a population of 6,300 (in 2003)

The 2007 Yap Islands Zika virus outbreak represented the first time Zika virus had been detected outside Africa and Asia. It occurred in the Yap Islands, an island chain in the Federated States of Micronesia. Zika virus (ZIKV) is a vector-borne flavivirus in the same family as yellow fever, dengue, West Nile and Japanese encephalitis viruses.

== Epidemiology ==
In 2007, physicians in the Yap Islands reported to the Centers for Disease Control and Prevention an outbreak of an illness characterized by rash, conjunctivitis, and arthralgia. Initial serum testing revealed some patients had the IgM antibody against dengue virus, yet the patients' signs and symptoms were clinically distinct from dengue fever. Subsequent retesting using consensus primers detected the presence of Zika virus RNA.

A household survey was conducted to determine the proportion of Yap residents with the IgM antibody against Zika virus and to identify possible mosquito vectors of Zika virus. In total, the Yap Islands outbreak had 49 confirmed and 59 probable cases of Zika virus disease. The patients resided in 9 of the 10 municipalities on Yap. None of the patients required hospitalization. No hemorrhagic manifestations occurred and no deaths resulted. It was estimated that 73% (95% confidence interval, 68 to 77) of Yap residents 3 years of age or older had been recently infected with Zika virus. Aedes hensilli was the predominant mosquito species identified.

The outbreak of Zika fever in Micronesia demonstrated the transmission of Zika virus outside Africa and Asia. This was considered a significant finding in that previously only 14 cases of Zika virus had been documented since the virus was first identified in 1947. Prior to the Yap Islands outbreak, no previous outbreaks of Zika virus had ever been reported and only 14 cases had been documented since the virus was first isolated in 1947. All previous cases had occurred within Africa and Asia.

== Reservoir ==
Aedes aegypti has been recognized as the vector of Zika virus. The virus was first isolated in 1947 from a sentinel rhesus monkey stationed on a tree platform in the Zika forest, Uganda.

== Transmission ==
Transmission is typically via the bite of the Aedes aegypti mosquito, although in this outbreak, Aedes hensilli was the predominant mosquito species identified.

== See also ==
- 2013–2014 Zika virus outbreaks in Oceania
- Zika virus outbreak in the Americas (2015–present)
