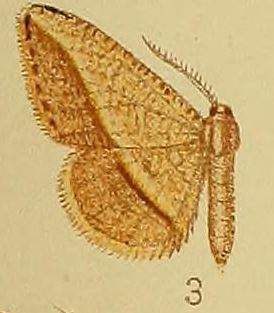
- Milocera arcifera

Scientific classification
- Kingdom: Animalia
- Phylum: Arthropoda
- Class: Insecta
- Order: Lepidoptera
- Family: Geometridae
- Tribe: Macariini
- Genus: Milocera; Swinhoe, 1904

= Milocera =

Genus of moths

Milocera is a genus of moth in the family Geometridae.

== Type species ==
- Milocera horaria Swinhoe, 1904

== Species ==
Species of this genus are:

- Milocera arcifera (Hampson, 1910)
- Milocera atreus Krüger, 2001
- Milocera aureolitoralis Krüger, 2001
- Milocera aurora Krüger, 2001
- Milocera dubia (Prout, 1917)
- Milocera depauperata Krüger, 2001
- Milocera diffusata (Warren, 1902)
- Milocera divorsa Prout, 1922
- Milocera eugompha Krüger, 2001
- Milocera falcula Prout, 1934
- Milocera herbuloti Krüger, 2001
- Milocera horaria Swinhoe 1904
- Milocera hypamycha Krüger, 2001
- Milocera ja Krüger, 2001
- Milocera obfuscata Krüger, 2001
- Milocera pelops Krüger, 2001
- Milocera podocarpi Prout, 1932
- Milocera pyrinia Prout, 1934
- Milocera scoblei Krüger, 2001
- Milocera sexocornuta Krüger, 2001
- Milocera tantalus Krüger, 2001
- Milocera thyestes Krüger, 2001
- Milocera umbrosa Herbulot, 1989
- Milocera ustatata Herbulot, 1973
- Milocera ustatoides Krüger, 2001
- Milocera zika Krüger, 2001
