= Milocera zika =

Scientific classification
- Kingdom: Animalia
- Phylum: Arthropoda
- Clade: Pancrustacea
- Class: Insecta
- Order: Lepidoptera
- Family: Geometridae
- Genus: Milocera
- Species: M. zika

Binomial name
- Milocera zika Krüger, 2001

Species of moth

Milocera zika is a moth species in the genus Milocera named after the Zika Forest in Uganda, Africa.
