= Milocera horaria =

Scientific classification
- Domain: Eukaryota
- Kingdom: Animalia
- Phylum: Arthropoda
- Class: Insecta
- Order: Lepidoptera
- Family: Geometridae
- Genus: Milocera
- Species: M. horaria

Binomial name
- Milocera horaria C. Swinhoe, 1904

Species of moth

Milocera horaria is a species of moth of the family Geometridae first described by Charles Swinhoe in 1904. It is found on Madagascar.

This species has a winglength of 11–14 mm.
