= Zika virus outbreak timeline =

Disease outbreak chronology

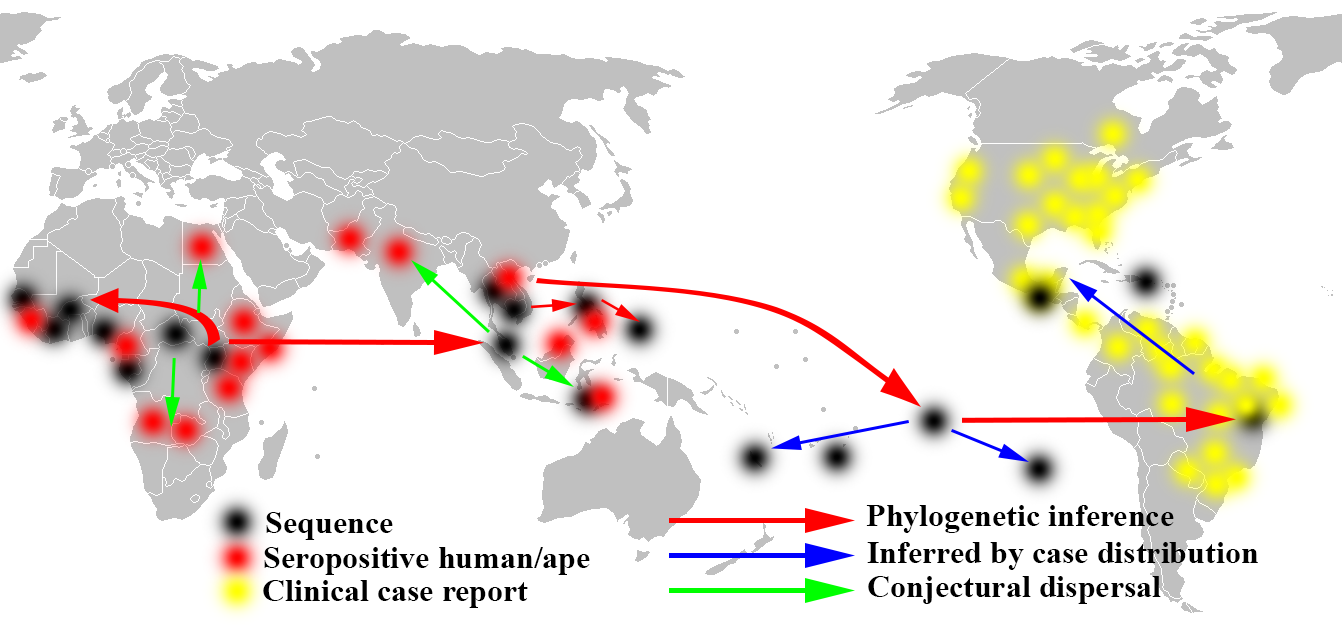
Spread of the Zika virus

This article primarily covers the chronology of the 2015–16 Zika virus epidemic. Flag icons denote the first announcements of confirmed cases by the respective nation-states, their first deaths (and other events such as their first reported cases of microcephaly and major public health announcements), and relevant sessions and announcements of the World Health Organization (WHO), and the U.S. Centers for Disease Control (CDC), as well as relevant virological, epidemiological, and entomological studies.

== Timeline ==
The date of the first confirmations of the disease or any event in a country may be before or after the date of the events in local time because of the International Dateline.

=== 1947–1983 ===
Uganda The Zika virus is first isolated in 1947 in a rhesus monkey in the Zika Forest near Entebbe, Uganda, and first recovered from an Aedes africanus mosquito in 1948. Serological evidence indicates additional human exposure and/or presence in some mosquito species between 1951 and 1981 in parts of Africa (Uganda and Tanzania having the first detection of antibody in humans, in 1952, followed by isolation of the virus from a young girl in Nigeria in 1954 during an outbreak of jaundice, and experimental infection in a human volunteer in 1956. The virus was then found variously in Egypt, Central African Republic, Côte d'Ivoire, Senegal, Sierra Leone, and Gabon; Between 1969 and 1983, Zika was found in equatorial Asia including India, Indonesia, Malaysia and Pakistan. Zika is generally found in mosquitoes and monkeys in a band of countries stretching across equatorial Africa) and Asia (Malaysia, Philippines, Thailand, Vietnam, and Indonesia). The first confirmed case of Zika fever in a human occurs in Uganda during 1964 in a field researcher, who experiences a mild, non-itchy rash.

=== 2007 ===
Federated States of Micronesia The first major outbreak is identified outside of Africa and Asia, on Yap Island. Previously only 14 cases of Zika fever had been documented since the virus had first been identified in 1947. Approximately 5,005 people, more than 70% of the population of 7,391, were infected with Zika, and generally exhibited mild symptoms; no cases of microcephaly were reported.

=== 2008 ===
United States The first case of sexual transmission is reported, that of a scientist who had fallen ill in Senegal who thereafter infected his wife.

=== 2012 ===
Researchers identify two distinct lineages of the Zika virus, African and Asian.

=== 2013–2014 ===
French Polynesia In October 2013, an independent outbreak of the Zika virus occurred in the Society, Marquesas and Tuamotu Islands of French Polynesia. The outbreak abated in October 2014, with 8,723 suspected cases of Zika reported. The true number of Zika cases was estimated at more than 30,000. An unusual rise in neurological syndromes is reported, including 42 cases of Guillain–Barré syndrome (GBS); typically five cases are reported in a three-month timeframe.

French Polynesia On 20 March, researchers discover that two mothers and their newborns test positive for Zika, perinatal transmission confirmed by polymerase chain reaction performed on serum collected within four days of birth during the outbreak.

French Polynesia On 31 March, researchers on Tahiti report that 2.8% of blood donors between November 2013 and February 2014 tested positive for the Zika virus, of which 3% were asymptomatic at the time of blood donation. This indicated a potential risk of transmission of the Zika virus through blood transfusions, but there were no confirmed cases of this occurring.

French Polynesia On 13 December, a patient recovering from Zika infection on Tahiti seeks treatment for bloody sperm. Zika virus is isolated from his semen, adding to the evidence that Zika can be sexually transmitted.

Japan In December 2013, a Japanese tourist returning to Japan was diagnosed with Zika virus infection by the National Institute of Infectious Diseases after visiting the French Polynesian island of Bora Bora, becoming the first imported case of Zika fever in Japan.

New Caledonia In January 2014, indigenous cases of Zika virus infection were reported in New Caledonia. The outbreak peaked in April, with the number of confirmed cases reaching 1,400 by 17 September.

Cook Islands In February 2014, an outbreak of Zika started in the Cook Islands. The outbreak ended on 29 May, with 50 confirmed and 932 suspected cases of Zika virus infection.

Easter Island In March 2014, there were one confirmed and 40 suspected cases of Zika virus infection on Easter Island.

Bangladesh A human blood sample that was obtained in 2014 was confirmed to have Zika virus by Bangladesh's health ministry on 22 March 2016.

=== 2015 ===
==== February ====
Solomon Islands An outbreak of Zika begins on the Solomon Islands, with 302 cases reported by 3 May.

==== March ====
Brazil On 2 March, an illness in Northeastern Brazil characterized by a skin rash is reported. In 2015 alone the virus was detected in several other regions. Subsequent genetic analysis of Brazilian Zika genomes suggest that virus may have been circulating undetected for over 1 year in Brazil.

==== April ====
Vanuatu On 27 April, the Vanuatu Ministry of Health reports that blood samples collected before March were confirmed to contain the Zika virus.

Brazil On 29 April, samples first test positive for the Zika virus.

==== May ====
Brazil On 15 May, the Ministry of Health reports the presence and circulation of the Zika virus in the states of Bahia and Rio Grande do Norte after testing 16 people for Zika.

==== July ====
Brazil On 17 July, neurological disorders in newborns associated with history of infection are reported.

==== September ====
Brazil A sharp increase in the number of microcephaly cases is reported. The state of Pernambuco used to register 10 cases of microcephaly annually, whereas in 2015 over 140 cases were registered.

==== October ====
Colombia On 16 October, Colombia confirms, by PCR, its first autochthonous Zika cases.

Colombia 27 cases of Guillain–Barré syndrome are reported in the region around Cucuta; 27,000 cases of Zika are reported nationwide.

Cape Verde On 21 October, Cabo Verde confirms, by PCR, its first outbreak of Zika.

==== November ====
Suriname On 2 November, Suriname reports its first two autochthonous cases.

Brazil On 11 November, the Ministry of Health declares a national public health emergency.

United Nations On 17 November, the Pan American Health Organization (PAHO), under the aegis of the WHO, issues an Epidemiological Alert regarding the increase in microcephaly cases in northeastern Brazil.

French Polynesia On 24 November, French Polynesian authorities announce that there had been an unusual increase in the number of cases of central nervous system malformations in fetuses and infants, including microcephaly, following the 2013–2014 outbreak.

El Salvador Also on 24 November, El Salvador reports its first three autochthonous cases

Guatemala On 26 November, Guatemala confirms, by PCR, its first autochthonous cases of Zika.

Mexico Also on 26 November, Mexico reports its first three cases of Zika infection, two autochthonous and one travel related (from Columbia).

Paraguay On 27 November Paraguay reports its first autochthonous cases.

Venezuela Also on 27 November, Venezuela reports its first seven cases.

Samoa, American Samoa and Tonga Local transmission of the Zika virus by mosquitoes is reported in the Polynesian islands of Samoa, American Samoa and Tonga.

==== December ====
United Nations On 1 December, PAHO releases a report noting the possible connection between the Zika virus and the rise in neurological syndromes. Three deaths are reported, and autochthonous circulation of the virus is reported in Brazil, Chile (on Easter Island), Colombia, El Salvador, Guatemala, Mexico, Paraguay, Suriname, and Venezuela.

Puerto Rico On 31 December, the Puerto Rico Department of Health reported the first locally acquired case of Zika virus infection in Puerto Rico. Zika was confirmed in a resident of Puerto Rico with no known travel history.

=== 2016 ===
==== January ====
United States On 17 January, a baby is born in Hawaii with the Zika virus and microcephaly, the first such case reported in the U.S.; the mother had lived in Brazil in May the previous year.

Taiwan On 19 January, a man from Thailand becomes the first imported case of Zika virus in Taiwan.

Samoa On 26 January, Samoa is added to the CDC travel advisory.

Curaçao On 31 January, Curaçao reports its first confirmed autochthonous case of Zika.

==== February ====
United Nations On 1 February, the WHO declares the Zika virus outbreak to be a Public Health Emergency of International Concern (PHEIC).

United States On 8 February, the Obama administration requests $1.8 billion in the fight against Zika.

United States On 11 February, the CDC releases preliminary guidelines regarding the sexual transmission of Zika. Three likely cases are reported.

United Nations On 12 February, the WHO advises pregnant women to avoid travel to areas where the transmission of the Zika virus is active.

United States On 12 February, the CDC releases a Level 2 (Practice Enhanced Precautions) travel notice.

==== March ====
United States As of 9 March, the CDC reports 193 travel-associated Zika virus disease cases, and no locally acquired vector-borne cases.

United States On 24 March, a genetics study published in Science suggests that the Zika virus had arrived in Brazil between May and December 2013.

United States On 30 March, the New England Journal of Medicine published "Zika Virus Infection with Prolonged Maternal Viremia and Fetal Brain Abnormalities," which documents the destruction of a fetal brain by Zika in detail; the Finnish mother had been infected in the 11th gestational week whilst travelling in Mexico, Guatemala, and Belize.

South Korea On 22 March, a man from Brazil becomes the first imported case of Zika virus in South Korea.

==== April ====
United States On 1 April, the CDC holds a meeting at its headquarters with more than 300 local, state, and federal officials and experts to coordinate the response to Zika, including a reorganization of mosquito control programs.

United States On 6 April the Obama administration, after a two-month long impasse with Congress, allocates $589 million in the fight against Zika (of which $510 million came from the $2.7 billion earmarked to battle the West African Ebola virus epidemic).

Peru On 16 April, Peru reports its first case of sexual transmission (and its seventh overall) after a resident infected his wife after contracting the disease in Venezuela.

United States On 29 April, the CDC confirms the first Zika-related death in the US occurred in February 2016. Zika first appeared in Puerto Rico in December 2015.

==== May ====
United States On 13 May 2016, the CDC begins to recommend testing urine for clues to Zika infection.

Belize On 16 May, Belize confirms its first case of Zika infection.

==== July ====
United States On 29 July 2016, the CDC confirms 4 cases of locally transmitted cases of Zika infection in Miami, Florida, the first locally transmitted cases confirmed in the mainland US.

==== August ====
Florida, United States 1 August 2016 In response to confirmed cases of localized mosquito transmission of Zika in Miami's Wynwood neighborhood, the CDC issued an official travel warning for Miami, Florida.

Puerto Rico 12 August 2016, The U.S. government declares a public health emergency in Puerto Rico as a result of a Zika epidemic.

Singapore 27 August 2016, Singapore's Ministry of Health confirms the first case of locally transmitted Zika infections in the country.

Singapore 28 August 2016, Singapore's National Environment Agency and Ministry of Health confirms 41 cases of locally transmitted Zika virus infections in a joint statement. Most of these cases are said to have been among foreign construction workers, and the authorities stated they expected more cases to be identified. 34 of the cases made a full recovery, but 7 remain hospitalized.

Singapore 29 August 2016, An additional 15 new cases of locally transmitted Zika infections are confirmed, bringing the total to 56 locally transmitted infections. The infections are traced to the Aljunied area in Singapore's south-east. Again, most of the infections were among foreign construction workers. Singapore's authorities step up prevention efforts including checking at-risk dormitories and spreading insect repellent.

Florida, United States 29 August 2016, after more locally transmitted cases of the Zika virus are reported in Southern Florida, Florida governor Rick Scott travels to Boca Raton in southern Florida to attend a roundtable discussion with tourism representatives, community officials and business leaders at the Boca Raton Resort. A total of 43 locally transmitted infections have now been contracted in Florida, the majority of which having occurred in Miami-Dade County. Miami Beach officials also say in a statement that the Miami Beach Botanical Garden would be temporarily closed off to visitors to prevent further spreading of the disease by mosquito bites.

Malaysia 29 August 2016, Malaysian health authorities say in a press conference that it was "just a matter of time" until cases Zika are detected in Malaysia. Health minister Subramaniam Sathasivam states that there had not yet been any confirmed cases, despite it already being present in surrounding countries, and urges those returning from the Rio Olympics and other Zika-affected countries to undergo voluntary blood tests and screening, adding that most carriers are asymptomatic.

Singapore 30 August 2016, the authorities of Australia, South Korea and Taiwan issue travel warnings against travel to Singapore over concerns about the spread of the Zika virus.

==== September ====
Malaysia 1 September 2016, Health Minister of Malaysia confirmed of the first case of Zika in Malaysia. The patient recently went to Singapore for three days. Vector control was intensified at the patient's area.

Malaysia 3 September 2016, A locally transmitted infection was detected in Sabah, Malaysia. The patient did not travel overseas recently and was probably bitten by an Aedes mosquito.

Singapore 5 September 2016, Singapore's Ministry of Health and National Environment Agency said that the total number of locally transmitted Zika virus infections over the weekend was 91, raising the total to 242. 83 of the new infections were connected to the Aljunied Crescent, Sims Drive, Kallang Way, and Paya Lebar Way areas, with a potential new cluster with two reported cases in the Seng Road area.

Florida, United States 19 September 2016 The CDC lifts official travel guidelines for Miami, Florida.

==== October ====
Vietnam 30 October 2016, Vietnam's Health Ministry has reported a microcephaly case that it says is likely to be the country's first linked to the mosquito-borne Zika virus.

== See also ==
- Epidemiology of chikungunya
- 2019–2020 dengue fever epidemic
- COVID-19 pandemic
