= Epidemiology of chikungunya =

Alpha virus epidemiology

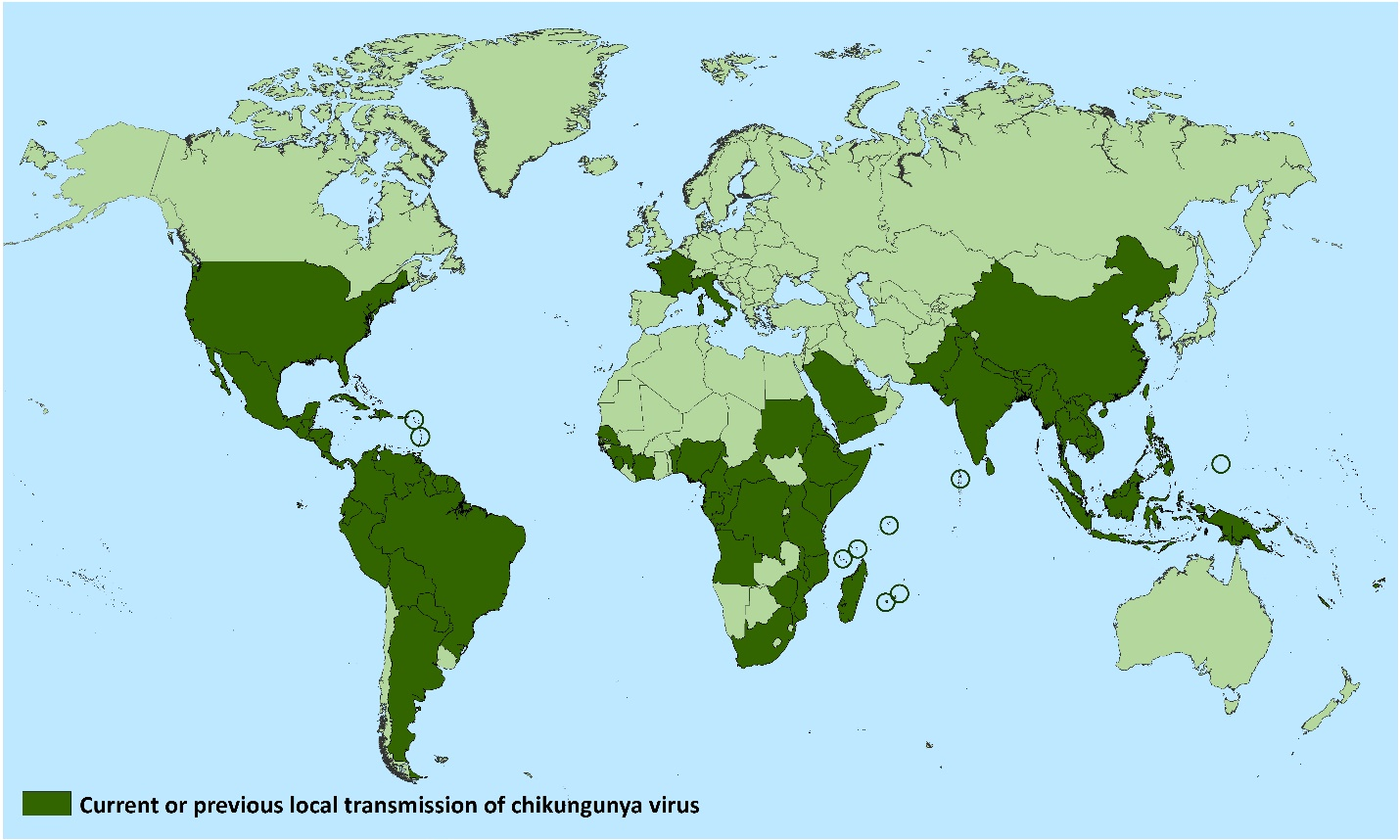
Dark green denotes countries with current or previous local transmission of CHIKV, per the CDC, September 2019.

Chikungunya is a mosquito-borne alpha virus that was first isolated after a 1952 outbreak in modern-day Tanzania. The virus has circulated in forested regions of sub-Saharan Africa in cycles involving nonhuman primate hosts and arboreal mosquito vectors. Phylogenetic studies indicate that the urban transmission cycle—the transmission of a pathogen between humans and mosquitoes that exist in urban environments—was established on multiple occasions from strains occurring on the eastern half of Africa in non-human primate hosts. This emergence and spread beyond Africa may have started as early as the 18th century. Currently, available data does not indicate whether the introduction of chikungunya into Asia occurred in the 19th century or more recently, but this epidemic Asian strain causes outbreaks in India and continues to circulate in Southeast Asia.

A number of chikungunya outbreaks have occurred since 2005, and since 2013, there have been cases of circulating chikungunya in developed countries such the United States and Australia. An analysis of the chikungunya virus's genetic code suggests that the increased severity of the outbreak that began in 2005 may be due to a change in the genetic sequence, altering the viral coat protein of the virus, which potentially allows it to multiply more easily in mosquito cells. The change allows the virus to use the Asian tiger mosquito (an invasive species) as a vector in addition to the more strictly tropical main vector, Aedes aegypti. In July 2006, a team analyzed the virus' RNA and identified the genetic changes that have occurred in various strains of the virus and determined those genetic sequences which led to the increased virulence of recent strains. The virus, CHIKV, is a small, enveloped virus which is a part of the alphavirus family Togaviridae. This characteristic improves the viruses ability to enter into the body and impact those most affected such as individuals over 65 years of age and individuals with underlying medical conditions. Individuals below the age of 30 are found to have a faster recovery time with the reasoning unknown at this time.

Outbreaks of chikungunya, on average, have low mortality rates. As it is generally a nonfatal disease, prevalence rates during most outbreaks are higher than incidence rates. Recently, it was discovered that approximately 39% of the worldwide population resides in environments where the chikungunya virus is endemic. The spikes of transmission have increased the worldwide fatal cases from 87 deaths per year in 2022 to 350 people per year as of October 2023. Few studies have thoroughly investigated the risks to those living in medically insufficient areas, but some surveys suggest higher rates of chronic effects. Challenges relating to staffing and financing in less-developed countries may contribute to the underreporting of cases. Current data on the co-morbidities of chikungunya infection states that individuals with severe cases of chikungunya have an increased prevalence of cardiac conditions along with diabetes and respiratory difficulties. With the exception of asthma, the risk of each concurrent condition with CHIKV infections increases with age. While the long term effects still need to be investigated, on average, 40% individuals with the multiple chikungunya virus infections experience persistent disabilities after 6 months and 28% of the people still had it after 18 months. Modern studies suggest a correlation between elevated CHIKV infections and risk factors including individuals that previously experienced joint-related pains and conditions, those aged 45 and above, and individuals of the female gender.

== 2005–06: Réunion ==
The largest outbreak of chikungunya ever recorded at the time occurred on the island of Réunion in the western rim of the Indian Ocean from late March 2005 to February 2006. At its height, the incidence peaked at about 25,000 cases per week or 3500 daily in early 2006. After an initial peak in May 2005, the incidence decreased and remained stable through the southern hemisphere winter, rising again at the beginning of October 2005. By mid-December, when southern hemisphere summer temperatures are favorable for the mosquito vector, the incidence began to rise dramatically into the first two months of 2006. The number of reported cases was thought to be underestimated. The case-fatality ratio for chikungunya fever during the outbreak was 1 in 1000. The French government sent several hundred troops to help eradicate mosquitoes. Although confirmed cases were much lower, some estimates based on extrapolations from the number detected by sentinel physicians suggested that as many as 110,000 of Réunion's population of 800,000 people may have been infected. Twelve cases of meningoencephalitis cases were confirmed to be associated with chikungunya infection. Other countries in the southwest Indian Ocean reported cases as well, including Mauritius and the Seychelles, and in Madagascar, the Comoros, and Mayotte.

== 2006: India ==
In 2006, there was a large outbreak in India. States affected by the outbreak were Andhra Pradesh, Andaman & Nicobar Islands, Tamil Nadu, Karnataka, Maharashtra, Gujarat, Madhya Pradesh, Kerala and Delhi. The initial cases were reported from Hyderabad and Secunderabad as well as from Anantpur district as early as November and December 2005 and is continue unabated. In Hyderabad alone an average practitioner saw anywhere between 10 and 20 cases every day. Some deaths have been reported but it was thought to be due mainly to the inappropriate use of antibiotics and anti-inflammatory tablets. The major cause of mortality is due to severe dehydration, electrolyte imbalance and loss of glycemic control. Recovery is the rule except for about 3 to 5% incidence of prolonged arthritis. As this virus can cause thrombocytopenia, injudicious use of these drugs can cause erosions in the gastric epithelium leading to exsanguinating upper GI bleed (due to thrombocytopenia). Also the use of steroids for the control of joint pains and inflammation is dangerous and completely unwarranted. On average there are around 5,300 cases being treated every day. This figure is only from public sector. The figures from the private sector combined would be much higher.

There have been reports of large scale outbreak of this virus in Southern India. At least 80,000 people in Gulbarga, Tumkur, Bidar, Raichur, Bellary, Chitradurga, Davanagere, Kolar and Bijapur districts in Karnataka state are known to have been affected since December 2005.

A separate outbreak of chikungunya fever was reported from Malegaon town in Nasik district, Maharashtra state, in the first two weeks of March 2006, resulting in over 2000 cases. In Orissa state, at most 5000 cases of fever with muscle aches and headache were reported between February 27 and March 5, 2006.

In Bangalore, the state capital of Karnataka (India), there seemed to be an outbreak of chikungunya in May 2006 with arthralgia/arthritis and rashes. As well as in the neighbouring state of Andhra Pradesh. In the 3rd week of May 2006 the outbreak of chikungunya in North Karnataka was severe. All the North Karnataka districts specially Gulbarga, Koppal, Bellary, Gadag, Dharwad were affected. The people of this region are hence requested to be alert. Stagnation of water which provides fertile breeding grounds for the vector (Aedes aegypti) should be avoided. The latest outbreak is in Tamil Nadu, India – 20,000 cases have been reported in June 2006. Earlier it was found spreading mostly in the outskirts of Bangalore, but now it has started spreading in the city also (Updated 30/06/2006). More than 300,000 people are affected in Karnataka as of July 2006.

Reported on 29/06/2006, Chennai—fresh cases of this disease has been reported in local hospitals. A heavy effect has been reflected in south TN districts like Kanyakumari and Tirunelveli. Residents of Chennai are warned against the painful disease.

June 2006—Andaman Islands (India) chikungunya cases had been registered virtually for the first time in the month of June 2006. In the beginning of the September cases have gone as much as in thousands. As reported in a local news magazine it has taken the state of epidemic in Andamans. Health authorities are doing their best to handle the situation. Relapsed cases have been noticed with severe pain and swelling in the lower limbs, vomiting and general weakness.

As of July 2006, nearly 50,000 people were affected in Salem, Tamil Nadu.

As of August 2006, nearly 100,000 people were infected in Tamil Nadu. Chennai, capital of Tamil Nadu is one of the worst affected.

On 24 August 2006, The Hindu newspaper reported that the Indian states of Tamil Nadu, Karnataka, Andhra Pradesh, Maharashtra, Madhya Pradesh, Gujarat and Kerala had reported 1.1 million (1.1 million) cases. The government's claim of no deaths is questioned.

== 2007: Italy ==
In September 2007, 130 cases were confirmed in the province of Ravenna, Northern Italy, in the contiguous towns of Castiglione di Cervia and Castiglione di Ravenna. One person died. The source of the outbreak was an Indian from Kerala, India.

== 2009: Thailand ==
By the end of September 2009, the Thai Ministry of Health reported more than 42,000 cases during the previous year in 50 provinces in the south of Thailand, including the popular tourist destination of Phuket. About 14 years had lapsed since the last appearance of the disease. In May 2009 the provincial hospital in Trang Province prematurely delivered a 2.7 kg (6 pounds) male baby from his chikungunya-infected mother in the hopes of preventing mother-foetus virus transmission. After a cesarean delivery, the physicians discovered that he had also been infected with the chikungunya virus, and put him under intensive care. The child died at six days from respiratory complications, possibly the only death from the outbreak, but the cause of death may not have been chikungunya since the child was delivered prematurely . The Thai physicians gave a preliminary presumption that chikungunya virus might be transmitted from a mother to her foetus.

== 2011–15 Pacific Islands ==
Outbreaks in the Pacific Islands began in New Caledonia in 2011 and have since occurred in a number of Pacific countries. Fully 1/2 of the entire population of French Polynesia has come down with chikungunya Asian genotype (130,000 cases with 14 dead), exploding from a month earlier with 35,000 cases in December 2014; the first ever case was in 2013.

== 2012: Cambodia ==
An outbreak occurred in Cambodia with at least 1500 confirmed cases. Provinces for which affection was confirmed were: Preah Vihear, Battambang, Kampong Thom, Kampong Chhnang, Kandal, Kampong Speu and Takeo.

== 2013–14: The Caribbean ==
In December 2013, it was confirmed that chikungunya was being locally transmitted in the Americas for the first time in the French Caribbean dependency of St. Martin, with 66 confirmed cases and suspected cases of around 181. It is the first time in the Americas that the disease has spread to humans from a population of infected mosquitoes.

By mid-January 2014, a number of cases had been confirmed in five countries: St. Martin, Saint Barthélemy, Martinique, Guadeloupe, and the British Virgin Islands. At the start of April, at least ten nations had reported cases. By the start of May, there were more than 4,100 probable cases, and 31,000 suspected cases spanning 14 countries, including French Guiana, the only non-island nation with at least one reported case. On May 1, the Caribbean Public Health Agency (CARPHA) declared a Caribbean-wide epidemic of the virus.

As of 21 January 2014, no cases had been reported in Puerto Rico. But by 15 July 2014, over 400 cases had been reported and health authorities believed the number of actual cases (i.e., including unreported cases) was much higher. By November 2014 the Pan American Health Organization reported about 800,000 suspected chikungunya cases in the Caribbean alone.

== 2014: United States ==
On July 17, 2014, the first chikungunya case acquired in the United States was reported in Florida by the Centers for Disease Control and Prevention in a man who had not recently traveled outside the United States. Shortly after another case was reported of a person in Florida being infected by the virus, not having traveled outside the U.S.

These were the first two cases where the virus was passed directly by mosquitoes to persons on the U.S. mainland. Aside from the locally acquired infections, there were 484 other cases reported in the United States as of 5 August 2014.

As of 11 September 2014, the number of reported cases in Puerto Rico for the year was 1,636. By 28 October, that number had increased to 2,974 confirmed cases with over 10,000 cases suspected.

== 2014: Venezuela ==
In September 2014, the Central University of Venezuela stated that there could be between 65,000 and 117,000 Venezuelans infected with chikungunya. Health Minister Nancy Pérez stated that only 400 Venezuelans were infected with chikungunya

== 2014: France ==
On October 20, 2014, 11 locally acquired cases of chikungunya were reported in Montpellier, Languedoc-Roussillon, in the South of France. 449 imported cases of chikungunya were also reported throughout France during the period May–November 2014.

== 2014: Costa Rica ==
As of December 2014, Costa Rica had 47 reported cases of chikungunya, 40 of which originated abroad, while 7 were locally acquired.

== 2014: Brazil ==
In June 2014 six cases of the virus were confirmed in Brazil, two in the city of Campinas in the state of São Paulo. The six cases are Brazilian army soldiers who had recently returned from Haiti, where they were participating in the reconstruction efforts as members of the United Nations Stabilisation Mission in Haiti. The information was officially released by Campinas municipality, which considers that it has taken the appropriate actions.

== 2014: El Salvador ==
On 25 September 2014, official authorities in El Salvador report over 30,000 confirmed cases of this new epidemic.

== 2014: Mexico ==
On 7 November 2014 Mexico reported an outbreak of chikungunya, acquired by local transmission, in southern state of Chiapas. The outbreak extends across the coastline from the Guatemala border to the neighbouring state of Oaxaca. Health authorities have reported a cumulative load of 39 laboratory-confirmed cases (by the end of week 48). No suspect cases have been reported.

== 2014–2015: Colombia ==
The first cases were officially confirmed in July 2014. Between that month and the end of 2014, as reported by the Colombian Health Institute (Instituto Nacional de Salud – INS (in Spanish)), there were 82,977 clinically confirmed cases and 611 cases confirmed through laboratory tests, bringing the total of confirmed cases during 2014 in Colombia to 83,588, 7 of which led to deaths. These cases were reported in the following regions: Amazonas, Atlántico, Arauca, Antioquia, Barranquilla, Bolívar, Boyacá, Caldas, Cartagena, Casanare, Cauca, Cesar, Córdoba, Cundinamarca, Huila, La Guajira, Magdalena, Meta, Putumayo, Nariño, Norte de Santander, Sucre, Santander, Santa Marta, Risaralda, Tolima, San Andrés and Valle del Cauca. According to news outlets, as of January 2015 at least one major city (Medellín) has issued sanitary alerts due to the expanding epidemic. By January 2015 the epidemic is considered to be in the initial expansion phase and it is expected by the Colombian National Health Institute (Instituto Nacional de Salud – INS) that the total number of cases will reach around 700,000 by the end of 2015 due to the in-country massive travel of tourists to and from regions where cases of the disease have been confirmed and the vector A. aegypti is indigenous. It is expected that the disease will become endemic and sustain itself, with a pattern of outbreaks similar to dengue fever, due to the fact that both vector and natural reservoirs are indigenous in large areas of the country.

On 24 September 2015, the Ministry of Health and Social Protection of Colombia officially declared the country free of chikungunya. There were 441,000 reported cases but the government estimated the infected to reach the 873,000.

== 2019: Republic of the Congo ==
The earliest case was reported on 7 January 2019 in Diosso, Republic of the Congo, and an outbreak was declared by the government on 9 February. By 14 April, 6,149 suspected cases had been reported, with Kouilou Department worst affected (47% of cases); suspected cases have also been reported in the Bouenza, Brazzaville, Lékoumou, Niari, Plateaux, Pointe-Noire and Pool departments. There have been no deaths reported.
