= NS2-3 protease =

Enzyme encoded by hepatitis C virus

NS2-3 protease (of hepatitis C virus, HCV) is an enzyme responsible for proteolytic cleavage between NS2 and NS3, which are non-structural proteins that form part of the HCV virus particle. NS3 protease of hepatitis C virus, on the other hand, is responsible for the cleavage of non-structural protein downstream. Both of these proteases are directly involved in HCV genome replication, that is, during the viral life-cycle that leads to virus multiplication in the host that has been infected by the virus.

== Background about Hepatitis C ==
Hepatitis C affects 170 million people around the world which includes 1.4 million people living in the U.S. Most of the people infected with this virus live in third-world countries which often tend to have poor sterilization of medical equipment, a common source of HCV infection. Education also plays a big part as a vast majority of people don't have access to the information about the virus, how it spreads and infects. Hepatitis C can enter human body through many ways which include sexual intercourse, blood transfusion and via HCV infected needles. HCV infection can lead to cirrhosis and liver cancer if interferon treatment fails.

== Viral genome ==
Hepatitis C virus is a single-stranded RNA virus in the family Flaviviridae. The genome consists made up of about 10,000 nucleotides and encodes a single polyprotein. Hepatitis C Virus (HCV) used host cell machinery to process its genome to synthesize three crucial viral proteases of which each has peptide cleaving role. These three proteases are also known as structural proteins. The HCV genome encodes 10 viral proteins: C, E1, E2, p7, NS2, NS3, NS4A, NS4B, NS5A and NS5B.

== Discussion ==
NS2-3 protease is the enzyme responsible for proteolytic cleavage between the non-structural proteins NS2 and NS3. NS3 protease, on the other hand, is responsible for the cleavage of non-structural proteins downstream. Both of these proteases are directly involved in HCV genome replication. NS2-3 protease mechanism is essential for viral production, as shown by in-vitro chimpanzee studies where chimps which were inoculated with HCV with fully mutated NS2-3 protease activity didn't develop HCV infection.

To this date, a promising cell-culture system has yet to be developed in a way that could support large scale need of future vaccine trials. The use of HCV non-structural proteins to initiate immune response in animal studies have shown promising results but the lack of robust tissue culture system and the ability of virus to mutate rapidly are still major hurdles. Interferon treatment has succeeded in only very small number of patients.

In the study discussed in this paper, Dentzer has succeeded in finding the actual viral protease domain and predicting possible ways to inhibit the protease mechanism.

Inhibitors for protease such as Papain, Subtilisin and one from Sindbis virus capsid might share some similarities as they all are cysteine proteases. If NS2-3 protease does share important similarities with other cysteine proteases, it might be possible to propose a model for inhibition of the NS2-3 cysteine protease activity, which might be able to offer a permissible approach to a robust vaccine for in-vitro animal model studies.

The team of researchers used native selenomethionine-containing protein that yielded crucial crystal forms. NS2 Pro (non-structural protease) monomer is made up of two sub-domains which is connected by a linker. Each monomer contains the anti-parallel alpha-helices and a loop of beta strands. NS2 dimer consists of two monomers each facing their N and C-termini toward each other. N-termini stay in close proximity while C-termini are farther apart from each other which resembles ‘butterfly’. NS2-3 protease is 42 kDa in length. Earlier studies also suggested that it was almost impossible to isolate NS2-3 protease due to hydrophobic nature of the native NS2.

Researchers have used a method called ‘Crystallization’ through which they have been able to isolate and further investigate role of NS2-3 protease. His143, Cys184 and Glu 163 are the three crucial resides responsible for proteolytic activity. These three residues together form an active site. Although NS2 protease has been proposed to have a unique fold, it is shown that superimposing three critical residues from other cysteine proteases revealed a major characteristic which would allow for more specific inhibitor studies. Researchers in this case used cysteine proteases such as papain and poliovirus 3C protease. NS2 dimer contains two active sites and requires dimerization for proteolytic activity.

There are also some critical residues including Pro 164 which help bend the peptide backbone of the Glu163 to offer the correct geometry so the catalytic process can occur. Cis-proline on the other hand offers dimer stability. The NS2-3 protease requires both NS2 and NS3 domain for proteolytic cleavage. Addition of Zinc is also required as NS2-3 protease is zinc dependent which releases N terminus of NS2. The tetrahedral geometry in active site hints at the zinc ion binding site. Although NS3 domain's active role is not known yet, scientist propose that NS3 may interact with the active site of NS2 which would provided with catalytic environment necessary for polyprotein processing. The presence of zinc-binding site doesn't necessarily mean that a devoid of zinc in the process would inhibit the viral catalytic process.

An experimental model was devised to test if HCV full-length polyprotein sequence with a mutation (either H143A or C184A) would give NS2-3 cleaved polyprotein. Expression of two mutants in the same experimental model should yield NS2 and NS3 as it would provide with one active site. As the data shown in the paper, NS2 and NS3 were cleaved which meant that co-expression of two mutants did yield at least one functional active site. This experiment also provided a model for membrane association that would help with future studies regarding inhibitors for NS2-3 protease which is crucial for viral replication.

The article has proposed the structure for NS2-3 cysteine protease active site and provided with in-vitro co-expression mutation study results which would change the way researchers currently look at polyprotein processing.
