= GB virus C =

Virus classification
- (unranked): Virus
- Realm: Riboviria
- Kingdom: Orthornavirae
- Phylum: Kitrinoviricota
- Class: Flasuviricetes
- Order: Amarillovirales
- Family: Hepaciviridae
- Genus: Pegivirus
- Species: Pegivirus hominis

Species of virus

GB virus C (GBV-C), formerly known as hepatitis G virus (HGV) and also known as human pegivirus (HPgV), is a virus in the family Hepaciviridae in the genus Pegivirus. It is known to infect humans but is not known to cause human disease. Reportedly, HIV patients coinfected with GBV-C can survive longer than those without GBV-C, but the patients may be different in other ways. Research is active into the virus' effects on the immune system in patients coinfected with GBV-C and HIV.

== Human infection ==
The majority of immunocompetent individuals clear GBV-C viraemia, but in some individuals, infection persists for decades. However, the time interval between GBV-C infection and clearance of viraemia (detection of GBV-C RNA in plasma) is not known.

About 2% of healthy US blood donors are viraemic with GBV-C, and up to 13% of blood donors have antibodies to E2 protein, indicating possible prior infection.

Parenteral, sexual, and vertical transmissions of GBV-C have been documented. Because of shared modes of transmission, individuals infected with HIV are often coinfected with GBV-C; the prevalence of GBV-C viraemia in HIV patients ranges from 14 to 43%.

Several but not all studies have suggested that coinfection with GBV-C slows the progression of HIV disease. In vitro models also demonstrated that GBV-C slows HIV replication. This beneficial effect may be related to action of several GBV-C viral proteins, including NS5A phosphoprotein and E2 envelope protein.

== Virology ==
It has a single-stranded, positive-sense RNA genome of about 9.3 kb and contains a single open reading frame (ORF) encoding two structural (E1 and E2) and five nonstructural (NS2, NS3, NS4, NS5A, and NS5B) proteins. GB-C virus does not appear to encode a C (core or nucleocapsid) protein like, for instance, hepatitis C virus. Nevertheless, viral particles have been found to have a nucleocapsid. The source of the nucleocapsid protein remains unknown.

=== Taxonomy ===
GBV-C is a member of the family Hepaciviridae, genus Pegivirus, and is phylogenetically related to hepatitis C virus, but replicates primarily in lymphocytes, and poorly, if at all, in hepatocytes. GBV-A and GBV-B are probably tamarin viruses, while GBV-C infects humans.

Another member of this clade, GBV-D, has been isolated from a bat (Pteropus giganteus). GBV-D may be ancestral to GBV-A and GBV-C.

The mutation rate of the GBV-C genome has been estimated at 10^{−2} to 10^{−3} substitutions/site/year.

== Epidemiology ==
GBV-C infection has been found worldwide and currently infects around a sixth of the world's population. High prevalence is observed among subjects with the risk of parenteral exposures, including those with exposure to blood and blood products, those on hemodialysis, and intravenous drug users. Sexual contact and vertical transmission may occur. About 10–25% of hepatitis C-infected patients and 14–36% of drug users who are seropositive for HIV-1 show the evidence of GBV-C infection.

It has been classified into seven genotypes and many subtypes with distinct geographical distributions. Genotypes 1 and 2 are prevalent in Northern and Central Africa and in Americas. Genotypes 3 and 4 are commons in Asia. Genotype 5 is present in Central and Southern Africa. Genotype 6 can be encountered in Southeast Asia. Finally, genotype 7 has been reported in China. Infection with multiple genotypes is possible.

Genotype 5 appears to be basal in the phylogenetic tree, suggesting an African origin for this virus.

== History ==
Hepatitis G virus and GB virus C (GBV-C) are RNA viruses that were independently identified in 1995, and were subsequently found to be two isolates of the same virus. Although GBV-C was initially thought to be associated with chronic hepatitis, extensive investigation failed to identify any association between this virus and any clinical illness. GB Virus C (and indeed, GBV-A and GBV-B) is named after the surgeon, G. Barker, who fell ill in 1966 with a non-A non-B hepatitis which at the time was thought to have been caused by a new, infectious hepatic virus.

== See also ==
- HPgV-2
