= HPgV-2 =

Human pegivirus 2

Virus classification
- (unranked): Virus
- Realm: Riboviria
- Kingdom: Orthornavirae
- Phylum: Kitrinoviricota
- Class: Flasuviricetes
- Order: Amarillovirales
- Family: Hepaciviridae
- Genus: Pegivirus
- Species: Pegivirus columbiaense

Human pegivirus

HPgV-2 (also known as human pegivirus type 2) is the second human pegivirus discovered. It was first identified in 2005 in blood of transfusion recipients and initially named hepegivirus 1 because it shared some genetic features with both pegiviruses and hepaciviruses. HPgV-2 was later independently discovered by another group in the blood of a HCV-infected patient who had undergone multiple blood transfusions and died from sepsis of unclear etiology. It was then named human pegivirus 2. HPgV-2 is now classified in the Pegivirus genus as part of Pegivirus columbiaense species.

HPgV-2 is a blood-borne virus that causes chronic long-term infections much like hepatitis C virus (HCV) and GB virus C (HPgV) – the first human pegivirus to have been discovered – but is not known to be associated with any disease. It usually infects people who are already infected by HCV and has the prevalence around 1–2% in such persons. Its prevalence in HCV/HIV coinfected subjects is still higher – up to 10%. However, its prevalence in the general population in China and USA is very low at 0.1–0.2%. The chronic infection by HPgV-2 is maintained in presence of antienvelop antibodies as is the case for HCV chronic infections, whereas in case of GB virus C, appearance of antibodies usually leads to resolution of the infection.

HPgV-2 is a positive-sense single-stranded RNA virus with the genome length around 9,800 nucleotides. It produces a single polyprotein translated from a single open reading frame, which is then cleaved by the viral protease into multiple viral proteins: two structural envelope glycoproteins (E1 and E2), six nonstructural proteins (NS2, NS3, NS4A, NS4B, NS5A, and NS5B), a truncated core protein (S, nucleocapsid), and an X protein of unknown function. Different strains of HPgV-2 have sequence homology of 90% or more.
