= Netanasvir =

Clinical data
- Trade names: 东卫卓; Dongweizhuo

Legal status
- Legal status: Rx in China

Identifiers
- IUPAC name: Methyl N-[(1R)-2-[(2S,4S)-2-[5-[7-[2-[(2S,5S)-1-[(2S)-2-(methoxycarbonylamino)-3-methylbutanoyl]-5-methylpyrrolidin-2-yl]-3H-benzo[e]benzimidazol-7-yl]-2,3-dihydro-1H-inden-4-yl]-1H-imidazol-2-yl]-4-(methoxymethyl)pyrrolidin-1-yl]-2-oxo-1-phenylethyl]carbamate
- CAS Number: 2007900-70-9
- PubChem CID: 122535557
- UNII: 4Y7YD32BYY

Chemical and physical data
- Formula: C_{51}H_{58}N_{8}O_{7}
- Molar mass: 895.074 g·mol^{−1}
- 3D model (JSmol): Interactive image
- SMILES: C[C@H]1CC[C@H](N1C(=O)[C@H](C(C)C)NC(=O)OC)C2=NC3=C(N2)C=CC4=C3C=CC(=C4)C5=C6CCCC6=C(C=C5)C7=CN=C(N7)[C@@H]8C[C@@H](CN8C(=O)[C@@H](C9=CC=CC=C9)NC(=O)OC)COC
- InChI: InChI=1S/C51H58N8O7/c1-28(2)43(56-50(62)65-5)49(61)59-29(3)15-22-41(59)47-53-39-21-17-33-24-32(16-18-35(33)45(39)55-47)34-19-20-38(37-14-10-13-36(34)37)40-25-52-46(54-40)42-23-30(27-64-4)26-58(42)48(60)44(57-51(63)66-6)31-11-8-7-9-12-31/h7-9,11-12,16-21,24-25,28-30,41-44H,10,13-15,22-23,26-27H2,1-6H3,(H,52,54)(H,53,55)(H,56,62)(H,57,63)/t29-,30-,41-,42-,43-,44+/m0/s1; Key:SXUUQUIMLYPBSV-IVSYMLMBSA-N

Netanasvir is an antiviral drug used to treat hepatitis C virus (HCV). In China, netansavir is approved for use in combination with encofosbuvir for the treatment of adult patients with chronic HCV genotypes 1, 2, 3, or 6, who are either treatment-naive or have been previously treated with interferon.
