= Cause (medicine) =

Reason for or origin of a disease or pathology

Cause, also called etiology (/ˌiːtiˈɒlədʒi/) or aetiology, is the reason or origination of something.

The word etiology is derived from the Greek αἰτιολογία (aitiología), meaning "giving a reason for" (from Ancient Greek αἰτία (aitía) 'cause' and -λογία (-logía)).

== Description ==
In medicine, etiology refers to the cause or causes of diseases or pathologies. Where no etiology can be ascertained, the disorder is said to be idiopathic. Traditional accounts of the causes of disease may point to the "evil eye". The Ancient Roman scholar Marcus Terentius Varro put forward early ideas about microorganisms in a 1st-century BC book titled On Agriculture.

Medieval thinking on the etiology of disease showed the influence of Galen and of Hippocrates. Medieval European doctors generally held the view that disease was related to the air and adopted a miasmatic approach to disease etiology.

Etiological discovery in medicine has a history in Robert Koch's demonstration that species of the pathogenic bacteria Mycobacterium tuberculosis causes the disease tuberculosis; Bacillus anthracis causes anthrax, and Vibrio cholerae causes cholera. This line of thinking and evidence is summarized in Koch's postulates. But proof of causation in infectious diseases is limited to individual cases that provide experimental evidence of etiology.

In epidemiology, several lines of evidence together are required to for causal inference. Austin Bradford Hill demonstrated a causal relationship between tobacco smoking and lung cancer, and summarized the line of reasoning in the Bradford Hill criteria, a group of nine principles to establish epidemiological causation. This idea of causality was later used in a proposal for a Unified concept of causation.

=== Disease causative agent ===
The infectious diseases are caused by infectious agents or pathogens. The infectious agents that cause disease fall into five groups: viruses, bacteria, fungi, protozoa, and helminths (worms).

The term can also refer to a toxin or toxic chemical that causes illness.

== Chain of causation and correlation ==
Further thinking in epidemiology was required to distinguish causation from association or statistical correlation. Events may occur together simply due to chance, bias or confounding, instead of one event being caused by the other. It is also important to know which event is the cause. Careful sampling and measurement are more important than sophisticated statistical analysis to determine causation. Experimental evidence involving interventions (providing or removing the supposed cause) gives the most compelling evidence of etiology.

Related to this, sometimes several symptoms always appear together, or more often than what could be expected, though it is known that one cannot cause the other. These situations are called syndromes, and normally it is assumed that an underlying condition must exist that explains all the symptoms.

Other times there is not a single cause for a disease, but instead a chain of causation from an initial trigger to the development of the clinical disease. An etiological agent of disease may require an independent co-factor, and be subject to a promoter (increases expression) to cause disease. An example of all the above, which was recognized late, is that peptic ulcer disease may be induced by stress, requires the presence of acid secretion in the stomach, and has primary etiology in Helicobacter pylori infection. Many chronic diseases of unknown cause may be studied in this framework to explain multiple epidemiological associations or risk factors which may or may not be causally related, and to seek the actual etiology.

== Etiological heterogeneity ==
Some diseases, such as diabetes or hepatitis, are syndromically defined by their signs and symptoms, but include different conditions with different etiologies. These are called heterogeneous conditions.

Conversely, a single etiology, such as Epstein–Barr virus, may in different circumstances produce different diseases such as mononucleosis, nasopharyngeal carcinoma, or Burkitt's lymphoma.

=== Endotype ===
An endotype is a subtype of a condition, which is defined by a distinct functional or pathobiological mechanism. This is distinct from a phenotype, which is any observable characteristic or trait of a disease, such as morphology, development, biochemical or physiological properties, or behavior, without any implication of a mechanism. It is envisaged that patients with a specific endotype present themselves within phenotypic clusters of diseases.

One example is asthma, which is considered to be a syndrome, consisting of a series of endotypes. This is related to the concept of disease entity.

Other example could be AIDS, where an HIV infection can produce several clinical stages. AIDS is defined as the clinical stage IV of the HIV infection.

== See also ==
- Molecular pathological epidemiology
- Molecular pathology
- Pathogenesis
- Disease causative agent
