= Encofosbuvir =

Clinical data
- Trade names: 英强布韦

Legal status
- Legal status: Rx in China

Identifiers
- IUPAC name: [3-[(2R,3R,4R,5R)-3-fluoro-4-hydroxy-3-methyl-5-[[[[(2S)-1-oxo-1-propan-2-yloxypropan-2-yl]amino]-phenoxyphosphoryl]oxymethyl]oxolan-2-yl]-2,6-dioxopyrimidin-1-yl]methyl (2S)-2-(methoxycarbonylamino)-4-methylsulfanylbutanoate
- CAS Number: 2232134-77-7
- PubChem CID: 141522644
- UNII: 82E4Q8WQV7

Chemical and physical data
- Formula: C_{30}H_{42}FN_{4}O_{13}PS
- Molar mass: 748.71 g·mol^{−1}
- 3D model (JSmol): Interactive image
- SMILES: C[C@]1(F)[C@@H](O[C@H](COP(OC2=CC=CC=C2)(N[C@H](C(OC(C)C)=O)C)=O)[C@H]1O)N3C(=O)N(COC([C@@H](NC(OC)=O)CCSC)=O)C(=O)C=C3
- InChI: InChI=1S/C30H42FN4O13PS/c1-18(2)46-25(38)19(3)33-49(42,48-20-10-8-7-9-11-20)45-16-22-24(37)30(4,31)27(47-22)34-14-12-23(36)35(29(34)41)17-44-26(39)21(13-15-50-6)32-28(40)43-5/h7-12,14,18-19,21-22,24,27,37H,13,15-17H2,1-6H3,(H,32,40)(H,33,42)/t19-,21-,22+,24+,27+,30+,49-/m0/s1; Key:GAHCKEWMXZYJAZ-VBWBMHESSA-N

Encofosbuvir is an antiviral drug used to treat hepatitis C virus (HCV). In China, encofosbuvir is approved for use in combination with netanasvir for the treatment of adult patients with chronic HCV genotypes 1, 2, 3, or 6, who are either treatment-naive or have been previously treated with interferon.
