= Equine pegivirus =

Virus classification
- (unranked): Virus
- Realm: Riboviria
- Kingdom: Orthornavirae
- Phylum: Kitrinoviricota
- Class: Flasuviricetes
- Order: Amarillovirales
- Family: Hepaciviridae
- Genus: Pegivirus
- Species: Pegivirus caballi

Synonyms
- Pegivirus E

Species of virus

Equine pegivirus (EPgV) is a virus in the genus Pegivirus of the family Hepaciviridae. It was discovered in 2013 in blood of horses and causes chronic infections. EPgV is not known to be responsible for any disease in horses. In a serosurvey of EPgV and related viruses, antibodies to EPgV were detected in the majority of horses, indicating a high prevalence in them.
