= Hepatitis C virus envelope glycoprotein E1 =

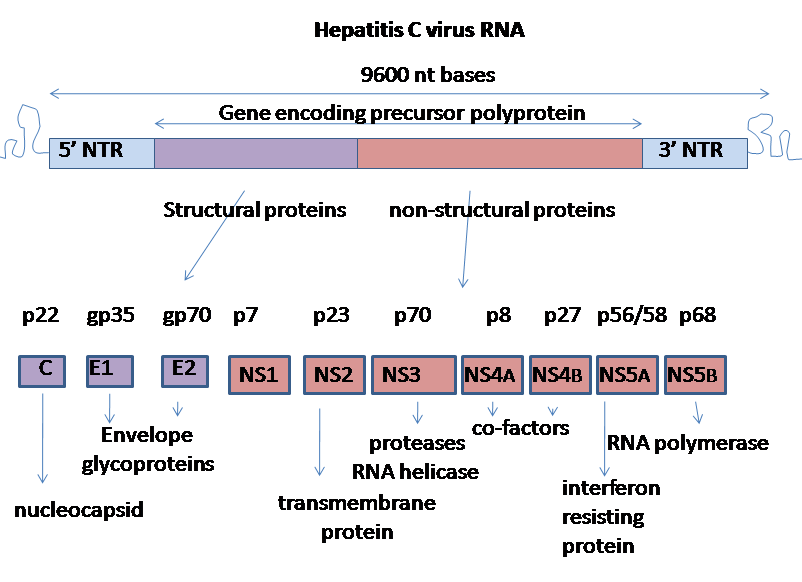
HCV genome

E1 is one of two subunits of the envelope glycoprotein found in the hepatitis C virus. The other subunit is E2. This protein is a type 1 transmembrane protein with a highly glycosylated N-terminal ectodomain and a C-terminal hydrophobic anchor. After being synthesized the E1 glycoproteins associates with the E2 glycoprotein as a noncovalent heterodimer.

== Structure ==
The E1 glycoprotein residues 192-383 in the genotype 1a H77 strain. After translation the E1 C-terminal transmembrane domains (TMDs) forms a hairpin of antiparallel a-helices. E1 is then cleaved by signal peptide peptidase at the endoplasmic reticulum and E1 is then made into a single long straight a-helix. What is known of the structure is from a crystal structure made in 2014. This crystal structure shows that it has two a-helixes and 3 B-sheets for both monomers; two disulfide bridges stabilize these two monomers. This means that E1 is more compact than its E2 counterpart. It has been shown that E1 can fold with a small amount of E2 protein present. In addition to this it was shown that E1 oxidation preceded E2 maturation. This means that E1 has a chaperone-like role for E2.

== Function ==
The E1 protein helps the virus attach to the membrane of the targeted cell. In other envelope virus the E1 protein has a similar role in helping the virus get into the cell. As a heterodimer with E2 it has been discovered that it is essential for HCV entry. When the heterodimer is formed the hepatitis C virus is then able to bind to the receptor of the cell. As a heterodimer the E1 protein alone with the E2 protein worked together to enter the cell. Also cleavage at the core-E1 junction is a prerequisite for SPP-catalyzed cleavage. This helps the virus relocate to the surface of lipid droplets. Once the virus gets to the surface of the lipid droplets it recruits the virus no-structural proteins and replication complex.

== Possible Vaccine ==
It has been shown that by blocking E1 we can prevent the formation of the envelope protein. There have been a number of studies trying to find the structure of E1. The hope for these vaccines is that they will be able to block the entry of Hepatitis C if they can block the formation of E1. If the virus cannot make the envelope protein then it will be unable to get into the host cells. The types of vaccines that would be used are synthetic peptide vaccines.
