= Proscyllium =

Scientific classification
- Domain: Eukaryota
- Kingdom: Animalia
- Phylum: Chordata
- Class: Chondrichthyes
- Subclass: Elasmobranchii
- Division: Selachii
- Order: Carcharhiniformes
- Family: Proscylliidae
- Genus: Proscyllium; Hilgendorf, 1904

Genus of sharks

The genus Proscyllium is a small genus of finback catsharks in the family Proscylliidae.

== Species ==
- Proscyllium habereri Hilgendorf, 1904 (graceful catshark)
- Proscyllium magnificum Last & Vongpanich, 2004 (magnificent catshark)
- Proscyllium venustum S. Tanaka, 1912
