= Hepatitis C virus nonstructural protein 2 =

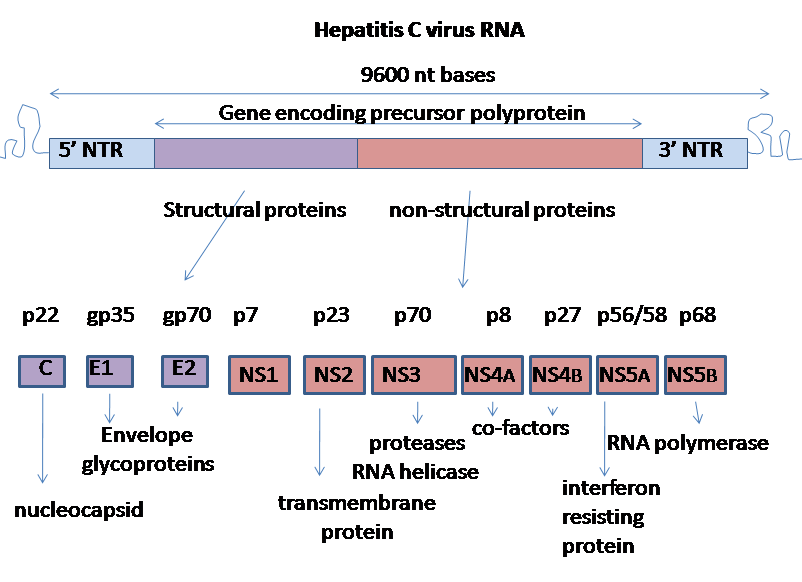
HCV genome

Nonstructural protein 2 (NS2) is a viral protein found in the hepatitis C virus. It is also produced by influenza viruses, and is alternatively known as the nuclear export protein (NEP).

== Role in Hepatitis C virus ==
NS2 is one of seven nonstructural proteins in HCV, with each being encoded near the carboxy-terminal end of the positive-strand RNA virus. Once translated it is 217 amino acids in length and has a molecular weight of approximately 23 kDa. NS2 possesses a hydrophobic amino-terminal subdomain as well as a carboxy-terminal cytoplasmic domain, with the amino-terminal subdomain containing up to three putative transmembrane segments.

NS2 proteins are post-translationally processed by the HPV-encoded cysteine protease NS2-3, which is formed by residues 94-217 of NS2 itself as well as residues 1-181 of nonstructural protein 3 (NS3). The NS2-3 autoprotease acts by making a single cleavage between the junction of NS2 and NS3. While the NS2 protein itself is unnecessary for replication of the HCV virus (as demonstrated by HPV replicons that were able to self-replicate after removal of the entire C to NS2 coding region), this cleavage of the NS2/NS3 junction is critical.

Despite being dispensable in the replication of HCV, NS2 does play an important role in the production of new HCV particles. Multiple studies have shown that the full NS2 RNA sequence (and thus protein) is necessary for viral assembly. While it is somewhat uncertain as to why this is, one group demonstrated that viral particle production in HPV chimeras was most efficient when the chimeric fusions were conducted directly downstream of the first transmembrane domain of NS2. This discovery implies that the first transmembrane segment of NS2’s hydrophobic amino-terminal subdomain physically interacts with upstream structural components of the HPV sequence. Its structure is indeed highly conserved between HCV genotypes, with a flexible helix in residues 3-11 and an alpha helix in residues 12-21. A subsequent implication is that the carboxy-terminal domain – which is also home to the proteasome region of NS2 – are not important in particle production. This theory is corroborated by evidence that mutations in the NS2 protease region do not effect virus production.

Additional research shows that NS2 is involved in HPV particle production. It has been determined that the substitution of one highly conserved NS2 residue, Ser-168, with either Alanine or Glycine results in impaired virus production but not impaired RNA replication. Impairment or elimination of particle production was determined via the number of infectious HPV particles released by transfected cells post-genome mutation. This result further demonstrates that NS2 is critical for viral assembly but not viral RNA replication (which is, however, influenced by cleavage of the NS2/NS3 junction as discussed previously). Furthermore, that same study theorized that the mutation of Ser-168 affects viral assembly in terms of release: assembled NS2 mutants were unable to exit the cell (and were thus not infectious), suggesting that NS2’s importance lies in the very late stages of assembly.

== Role in the inhibition of apoptosis ==
NS2 is an inhibitor of liver cell apoptosis. The viral protein interacts with CIDE-B, a liver-specific pro-apoptotic protein whose carboxy-terminal killing domain induces cell death activity. The binding specificity is strong enough to counteract CIDE-B’s induced release of mitochondrial cytochrome c, as demonstrated by single deletion mutations that result in a loss of interference. This activity has been interpreted as an important strategy for the survival of HCV in host cells.

== See also ==
- NS1 influenza protein
