= Eridacnis =

Scientific classification
- Kingdom: Animalia
- Phylum: Chordata
- Class: Chondrichthyes
- Subclass: Elasmobranchii
- Division: Selachii
- Order: Carcharhiniformes
- Family: Proscylliidae
- Genus: Eridacnis; H. M. Smith, 1913

Genus of sharks

The genus Eridacnis, the ribbontail catsharks, is a small genus of fin-back catsharks in the family Proscylliidae. It currently consists of the following species:

- Eridacnis barbouri (Bigelow & Schroeder, 1944) (Cuban ribbontail catshark)
- Eridacnis radcliffei H. M. Smith, 1913 (pygmy ribbontail catshark)
- Eridacnis sinuans (J. L. B. Smith, 1957) (African ribbontail catshark)
