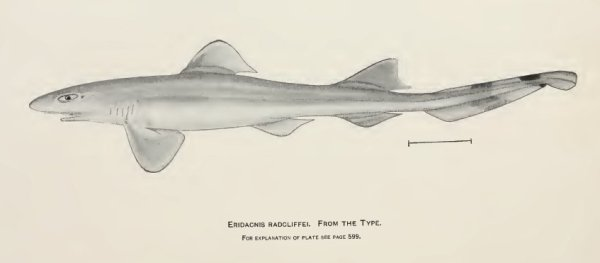
- Eridacnis radcliffei

Scientific classification
- Kingdom: Animalia
- Phylum: Chordata
- Class: Chondrichthyes
- Subclass: Elasmobranchii
- Division: Selachii
- Order: Carcharhiniformes
- Suborder: Carcharhinoidei
- Family: Proscylliidae; Compagno, 1984

Genera
- See text

= Proscylliidae =

Finback catsharks

Family of sharks

The finback catsharks are a small family, the Proscylliidae, of ground sharks. They can be found in warm seas worldwide and are often the most numerous and common shark in tropical regions. They are generally less than 1 m in length, and are slow-moving predators that feed on bony fish and small invertebrates. Although some bear live young, the majority lay eggs with almost fully developed young; these egg cases, known as "mermaid's purses", are unique in appearance to each species.

== Taxonomy ==
=== Genus Proscyllium Hilgendorf 1904 ===
- Graceful catshark (Proscyllium habereri) was first discovered by Hildendorf in 1901.
- Proscyllium venustum is found in temperate regions. It is distributed along the Northwest Pacific, primarily Japan. These sharks are oviparous; they lay eggs in pairs in which the embryos feed solely on yolk. This species is considered harmless to humans.
- Magnificent catshark (Proscyllium magnificum) A newly discovered species within the family Proscyllidae, it has little supporting research. It is tan in coloration with dark spots and blotches. The body is considered slender and firm. This species grows to be at least 450 mm in length. They have been found in tropical waters throughout the eastern Indian Ocean off the coast of Myanmar.

=== Genus Eridacnis H. M. Smith, 1913 ===
- Pygmy ribbontail catshark (Eridacnis radcliffei) It is known to be one of the smallest sharks within its species, with a maximum length around 257 mm. It is distributed in the waters surrounding the Philippines, along with the Indo-West Pacific Ocean. They are found located near muddy bottoms of the continental shelves. It is not a species directly targeted by the fishing industry; however, it is negatively impacted as bycatch by the shrimping industry due to shrimp being its primary food source. They are considered harmless to humans.
- Cuban ribbontail catshark (Eridacnis barbouri), can be found in deep water along the upper continental shelf. They are distributed throughout the western central Atlantic. Their primary food source is small fishes, crustaceans, and cephalopods. Having two young per litter, ranging in size at birth to over 10 cm, this species is ovoviviparous. This species is viewed as harmless to humans.
- African ribbontail catshark (Eridacnis sinuans), is grey-brown in color. They are distributed within the western Indian Ocean, but confined to the South Africa, Mozambique, and Tanzania. This species is primarily found along the upper continental shelf in deep water. This species feeds on small bony fishes, crustaceans, and cephalopods. Their ovoviviparous reproductive system allows them to have two young per litter between 15 and 17 cm in length when born. This species is also considered harmless to humans.

=== Genus Ctenacis Compagno, 1973 ===
The harlequin catshark (Ctenacis fehlmanni) has some unique characteristics that set it aside from the others. Its large mouth, small teeth and large pharynx with gill raker papillae make it unique among the family Proscyllidae. They are found in the tropical outer continental shelves of the western Indian Ocean, off the coast of Somalia, feeding on very small invertebrates. They are oviparous, laying paired eggs in which their embryos feed solely on yolk.

== Distribution ==
Found primarily along the continental shelves, these species are scattered throughout the world. They have been documented and seen primarily in: Japan, Myanmar, the Philippines, South Africa, Mozambique, Tanzania, and Somalia.

== Lifecycle ==
=== Reproduction ===
Within this family, species are either oviparous or ovoviviparous. Oviparous refers to many benthic sharks that lay their eggs on the seafloor and attach them to a substrate. The eggs have a hard and leathery shell surrounding them to serve as protection. The eggs feed solely on the yolk present within the casing. Other species within this family are ovoviviparous. Ovoviviparous sharks give birth to live young.

== Human interactions ==
This family of small ground sharks is not targeted by humans for any fishing or food purposes. Although not endangered or threatened, these species are negatively impacted by fisheries as a result of bycatch. The shrimping industry has affected them the most.
