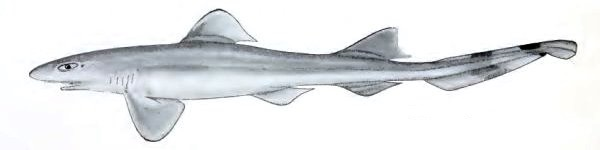

Conservation status
- Least Concern (IUCN 3.1)

Scientific classification
- Kingdom: Animalia
- Phylum: Chordata
- Class: Chondrichthyes
- Subclass: Elasmobranchii
- Division: Selachii
- Order: Carcharhiniformes
- Family: Proscylliidae
- Genus: Eridacnis
- Species: E. radcliffei

Binomial name
- Eridacnis radcliffei H. M. Smith, 1913
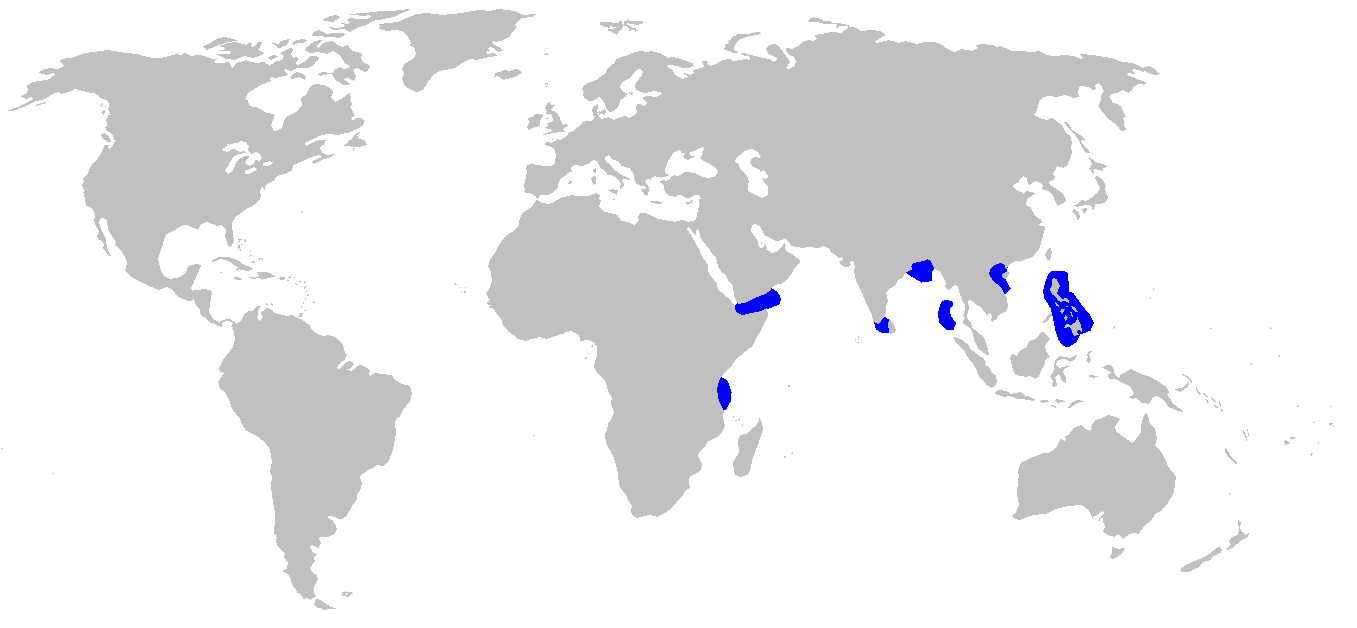
- Range of the pygmy ribbontail catshark

Synonyms
- Proscyllium alcocki Misra, 1950

= Pygmy ribbontail catshark =

Species of shark

The pygmy ribbontail catshark (Eridacnis radcliffei) is a species of finback catshark, family Proscylliidae, distributed patchily in the western Indo-Pacific from Tanzania to the Philippines. It occurs around the edges of continental and insular shelves at a depth of 71–766 m (233–2,513 ft), typically on or near mud bottoms. One of the smallest living shark species, the pygmy ribbontail catshark grows to a maximum known length of 24 cm (9.4 in). It has a slender body with a low, ribbon-like tail fin, and is dark brown in color with blackish dorsal fin markings and tail bands. This shark feeds mainly on bony fishes, followed by crustaceans and then squid. It is aplacental viviparous with females bearing litters of 1–2 relatively large pups. It is of minimal significance to fisheries, being caught as bycatch in some areas.

== Taxonomy ==
The first known specimens of the pygmy ribbontail catshark were collected during the 1907–1910 Philippine Expedition of the U.S. Fish Commission Steamer Albatross. Hugh McCormick Smith, Deputy Fish Commissioner and director of the expedition, published a description of this shark in a 1913 issue of the Proceedings of the United States National Museum, naming it for the expedition's General Assistant and Naturalist Lewis Radcliffe, and creating for it the new genus Eridacnis. The type specimen is a 23 cm (9.1 in) long adult female caught off Jolo Island in the Sulu Archipelago, Philippines.

== Distribution and habitat ==
By far the most widely (if sporadically) distributed member of its genus, the pygmy ribbontail catshark has been reported from Tanzania, the Gulf of Aden, the Gulf of Mannar, the Bay of Bengal, the Andaman Islands, Vietnam, and the Philippines. This bottom-dwelling shark occurs at depths of 71–766 m (233–2,513 ft) on outer continental and insular shelves or upper slopes, commonly over mud.

== Description ==
The pygmy ribbontail catshark has a thin body with a short, rounded snout and elongated, oval eyes bearing rudimentary nictitating membranes. Each nostril is preceded by a short, triangular flap of skin. The mouth is wide and V-shaped, without furrows at the corners and containing numerous rows of small, multi-pointed teeth that become more comb-like towards the sides. There are papillae on the roof of the mouth and the edges of the gill arches. The two dorsal fins are of comparable size, the first positioned slightly closer to the pectoral than the pelvic fins and the second over the anal fin. The caudal fin is low and long, comprising a quarter of the total length or more, and lacks a lower lobe. The coloration is a plain dark brown, with black markings on the dorsal fins and darker bands on the caudal fin. The maximum recorded lengths are 23 cm (9.1 in) for a male and 24 cm (9.4 in) for a female. One male shark 18.6 cm (7.3 in) long weighed 14 g (0.49 oz), and a pregnant female 24.2 cm (9.5 in) long weighed 37 g (1.3 oz).

== Biology and ecology ==
The pygmy ribbontail catshark is reportedly very abundant in some places, such as off southern India and the Philippines. One study in Indian waters found that 55% of this shark's diet was composed of bony fishes (mainly lanternfishes but also bristlemouths and small eels), 28% of crustaceans (mainly shrimp but also stomatopods and crab larvae), 14% of squid, and the remainder of other items including a bivalve.

Reproduction is aplacental viviparous, with the developing young being sustained by a yolk sac until they are ready to be born. Female pygmy ribbontail catsharks are capable of becoming pregnant at 16.6 cm (6.5 in) long, though only females over 18 cm (7.1 in) long have been found with fully developed fetuses, suggesting that they grow substantially during the gestation period. One or two pups are born at a time; the newborns are extremely large relative to their mothers, measuring around 11 cm (4.3 in) in length. Males reach sexual maturity at a length of 18–19 cm (7.1–7.5 in) and females at perhaps 15–16 cm (5.9–6.3 in). This is comparable to the sizes at maturity of the spined pygmy shark (Squaliolus laticaudus) and the dwarf lanternshark (Etmopterus perryi), ranking the pygmy ribbontail catshark among the world's smallest sharks. Due to the difficulties involved in assessing reproductive maturity in sharks, whether one of these species is truly smaller than the others cannot yet be definitively determined.

== Human interactions ==
Pygmy ribbontail catsharks are captured incidentally in bottom trawls off the Philippines, but are not known to be utilized. Its conservation status has not been evaluated by the International Union for Conservation of Nature (IUCN).
