= HIV disease progression rates =

Following infection with HIV-1, the rate of clinical disease progression varies between individuals. Factors such as host susceptibility, genetics and immune function, health care and co-infections as well as viral genetic variability may affect the rate of progression to the point of needing to take medication in order not to develop AIDS.

== Rapid progressors ==
A small percentage of HIV-infected individuals rapidly progress to AIDS if they fail to take the medication within four years after primary HIV-infection and are termed Rapid Progressors (RP). Indeed, some individuals have been known to progress to AIDS and death within a year after primo-infection. Rapid progression was originally thought to be continent specific, as some studies reported that disease progression is more rapid in Africa, but others have contested this view.

== Long term non-progressors ==
Another subset of individuals who are persistently infected with HIV-1, but show no signs of disease progression for over 12 years and remain asymptomatic are classified as Long Term Non-Progressors (LTNP). In these individuals, it seems that HIV-infection has been halted with regard to disease progression over an extended period of time. However, the term LTNP is a misnomer as that progression towards AIDS can occur even after 15 years of stable infection. LTNP are not a homogeneous group regarding both viral load and specific immune responses against HIV-1. Some LTNPs are infected with HIV that inefficiently replicates whilst others are infected with HIV that is virally fit and replicates normally, but the infected individual has had a strong and broad set of HIV-specific humoral and cell-mediated responses that seems to delay the progression to AIDS. In some cohorts, individuals who experience signs of progression, but whose clinical and laboratory parameters remain stable over long periods of time, are classified as Long Term Survivors (LTS).

== Highly exposed persistently seronegative ==
There is another, smaller percentage of individuals who have been recently identified. These are called Highly Exposed Persistently Seronegative (HEPS). This is a small group of individuals and has been observed only in a group of uninfected HIV-negative sex workers in Kenya and in The Gambia. When these individuals' PBMCs are stimulated with HIV-1 peptides, they have lymphoproliferative activity and have HIV-1 specific CD8+ CTL activity suggesting that transient infection may have occurred. This does not occur in unexposed individuals. What is interesting, is that the CTL epitope specificity differs between HEPS and HIV positive individuals, and in HEPS, the maintenance of responses appears to be dependent upon persistent exposure to HIV.

== Prediction of progression rates ==
During the initial weeks after HIV infection, qualitative differences in the cell-mediated immune response are observed that correlate with different disease progression rates (i.e., rapid progression to WHO stage 4 and the rapid loss of CD4+ T cell levels versus normal to slow progression to WHO stage 4 and the maintenance of CD4+ T cell counts above 500/μL). The appearance of HIV-1-specific CD8+ cytotoxic T cells (CTLs) early after primo-infection has been correlated with the control of HIV-1 viremia. The virus which escapes this CTL response have been found to have mutations in specific CTL epitopes. Individuals with a broad expansion of the V-beta chain of the T cell receptor of CD8+ T cells during primo-infection appear to have low levels of virus six to twelve months later, which is predictive of relatively slow disease progression. In contrast, individuals with an expansion of only a single subset of the V-beta chain of the CD8+ T cells are not able to control HIV levels over time, and thus have high viral loads six to twelve months later. LTNP’s have also been shown to have a vigorous proliferation of circulating activated HIV-1-specific CD4+ T cell and CTL response against multiple epitopes with no detectable broadly cross-reactive neutralizing antibodies in the setting of an extremely low viral load. However, a few reports have correlated the presence of antibodies against Tat in LTNP status.

== HIV subtype variation and effect on progression rates ==
The HIV-1 subtype that an individual becomes infected with can be a major factor in the rate of progression from sero-conversion to AIDS. Individuals infected with subtypes C, D and G are 8 times more likely to develop AIDS than individuals infected with subtype A. In Uganda, where subtypes A and D are most prevalent, subtype D is associated with faster disease progression compared with subtype A. Age has also been shown to be a major factor in determining survival and the rate of disease progression, with individuals over 40 years of age at sero-conversion being associated with rapid progression.

== Host genetic susceptibility ==
The Centers for Disease Control and Prevention (CDC) has released findings that genes influence susceptibility to HIV infection and progression to AIDS. HIV enters cells through an interaction with both CD4 and a chemokine receptor of the 7 transmembrane family. They first reviewed the role of genes in encoding chemokine receptors (CCR5 and CCR2) and chemokines (SDF-1). While CCR5 has multiple variants in its coding region, the deletion of a 32-bp segment results in a nonfunctional receptor, thus preventing HIV entry; two copies of this gene provide strong protection against HIV infection, although the protection is not absolute. This allele is found in around 10% of Europeans but is rare in Africans and Asians. Multiple studies of HIV-infected persons have shown that the presence of one copy of this mutation, named CCR5-Δ32 (CCR5 delta 32) delays progression to the condition of AIDS by about 2 years.

The National Institute of Health (NIH) has funded research studies to learn more about this genetic mutation. In such research, NIH has found that there exist genetic tests that can determine if a person has this mutation. Implications of a genetic test may in the future allow clinicians to change treatment for the HIV infection according to the genetic makeup of an individual, Currently there exist several at-home tests for the CCR5 mutation in individuals; however, they are not diagnostic tests.

A relatively new class of drugs for HIV treatment relies on the genetic makeup of the individual. Entry inhibitors bind to the CCR5 protein to block HIV from binding to the CD4 cell.

== The effect of co-infections on progression rates ==
Coinfections or immunizations may enhance viral replication by inducing a response and activation of the immune system. This activation facilitates the three key stages of the viral life cycle: entry to the cell; reverse transcription and proviral transcription. Chemokine receptors are vital for the entry of HIV into cells. The expression of these receptors is inducible by immune activation caused by infection or immunization, thus augmenting the number of cells that can be infected by HIV-1. Both reverse transcription of the HIV-1 genome and the rate of transcription of proviral DNA rely upon the activation state of the cell and are less likely to be successful in quiescent cells. In activated cells, there is an increase in the cytoplasmic concentrations of mediators required for reverse transcription of the HIV genome. Activated cells also release IFN-alpha which acts on an autocrine and paracrine loop that up-regulates the levels of physiologically active NF-kappa B which activates host cell genes as well as the HIV-1 LTR. The impact of co-infections by micro-organisms such as Mycobacterium tuberculosis can be important in disease progression, particularly for those who have a high prevalence of chronic and recurrent acute infections and poor access to medical care. Often, survival depends upon the initial AIDS-defining illness. Co-infection with DNA viruses such as HTLV-1, herpes simplex virus-2, varicella zoster virus, and cytomegalovirus may enhance proviral DNA transcription and thus viral load as they may encode proteins that can trans-activate the expression of the HIV-1 pro-viral DNA. Frequent exposure to helminth infections, which are endemic in Africa, activates individual immune systems, thereby shifting the cytokine balance away from an initial Th1 cell response against viruses and bacteria which would occur in the uninfected person to a less protective T helper 0/2-type response. HIV-1 also promotes a Th1 to Th0 shift and replicates preferentially in Th2 and Th0 cells. This makes the host more susceptible to and less able to cope with infection with HIV-1, viruses and some types of bacteria. Ironically, exposure to dengue virus seems to slow HIV progression rates temporarily.

== See also ==
- CCR5
