= Equine hepacivirus =

Virus classification
- (unranked): Virus
- Realm: Riboviria
- Kingdom: Orthornavirae
- Phylum: Kitrinoviricota
- Class: Flasuviricetes
- Order: Amarillovirales
- Family: Hepaciviridae
- Genus: Orthohepacivirus
- Species: Orthohepacivirus equi

Synonyms
- Canine hepacivirus; Non-primate hepacivirus; Equine hepacivirus; Hepacivirus A

Species of virus

Equine hepacivirus (EHV) is a positive-sense single-stranded RNA virus of the genus Orthohepacivirus. EHV includes Canine hepacivirus (CHV). It infects dogs and horses, and causes pulmonary infections in dogs. Like the related Hepatitis C virus, it is known to cause chronic hepatitis in horses.

== History ==
The virus was isolated in 2011 from a number of dogs suffering from respiratory infections. Later, distinct lineages were isolated from horses in different locations.

== Genome ==
As of 2012, the genome has not yet been fully sequenced. The available sequence is about 6,500 nucleotides in length. It is predicted to have a polyprotein that can be cleaved into 10 smaller proteins. There is a 'slippery sequence' – A_{5}NNA_{5} – within the genome which may encode a programmed frameshift. It encodes two envelope proteins (E1 and E2) as well as cysteine and serine proteases.

The overall G+C content is 50.7%.

== Evolution ==
The virus appears to have evolved from the Hepatitis C virus between 500 and 1,000 years ago.

The equine lineages (EHV) are more diverse than the canine lineages (CHV), suggesting that the former are ancestral to the latter. CHV appears to have originated in a cross-species transmission from horses to dogs around 1970. The origin of EHV is not known, but it seems that both EHV and Hepatitis C virus have originated in separate cross-species transmission events from a common source.
