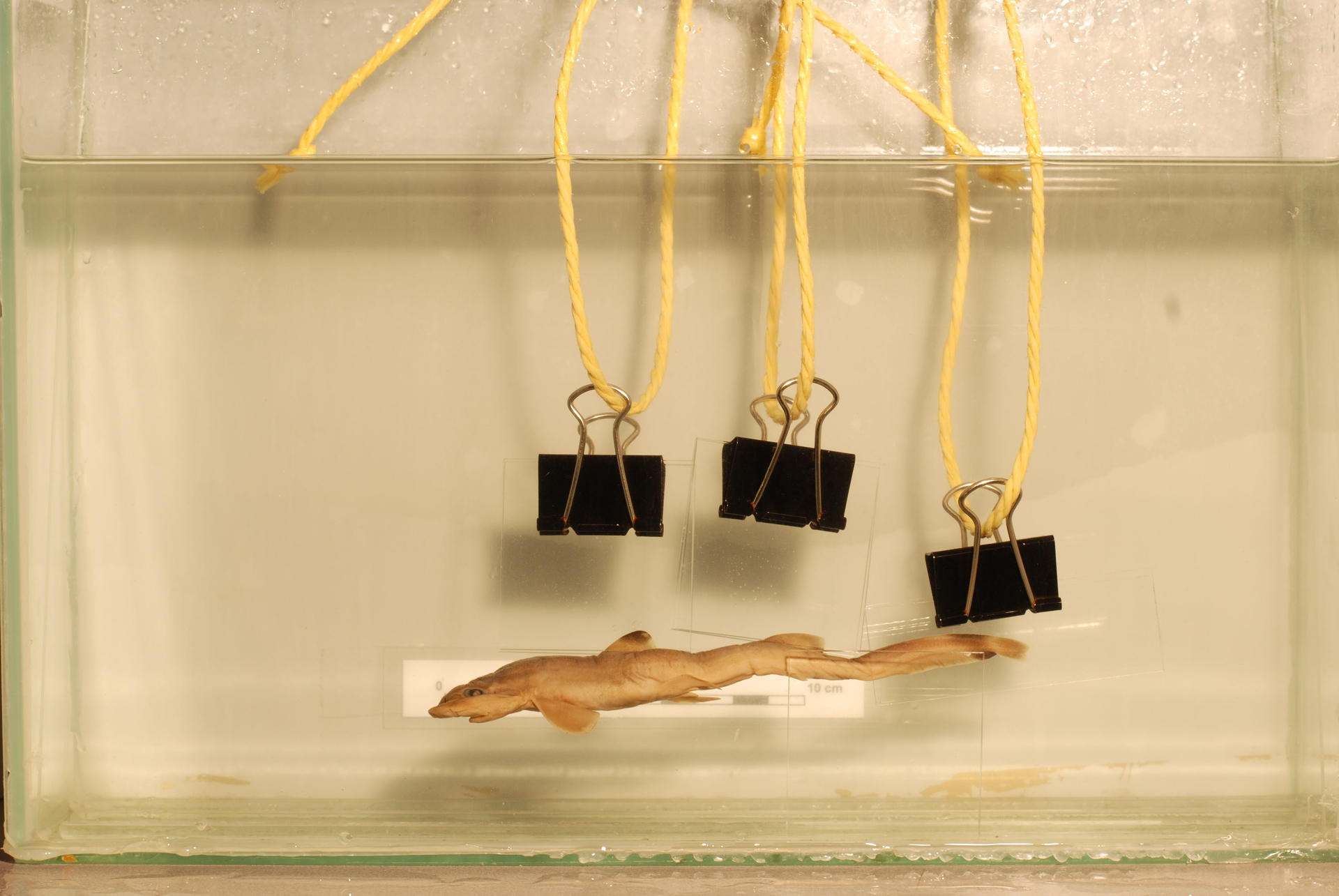

Conservation status
- Least Concern (IUCN 3.1)

Scientific classification
- Kingdom: Animalia
- Phylum: Chordata
- Class: Chondrichthyes
- Subclass: Elasmobranchii
- Division: Selachii
- Order: Carcharhiniformes
- Family: Proscylliidae
- Genus: Eridacnis
- Species: E. sinuans

Binomial name
- Eridacnis sinuans (J. L. B. Smith, 1957)
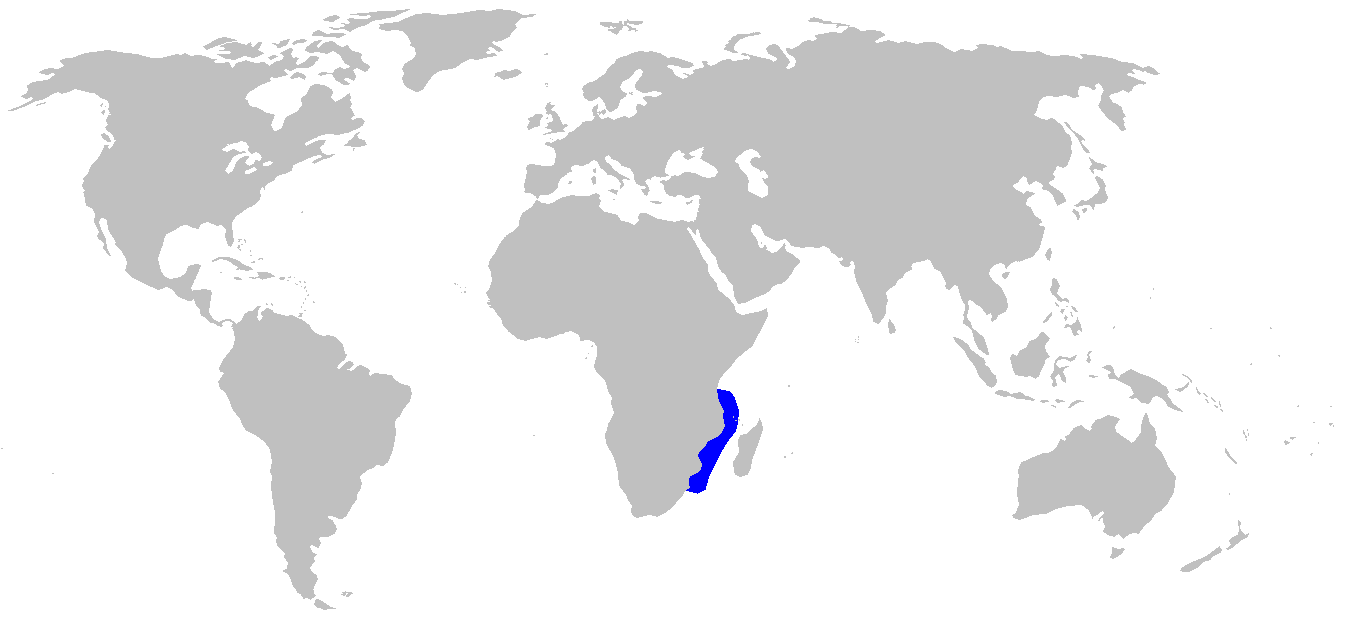

= African ribbontail catshark =

Species of shark

The African ribbontail catshark, Eridacnis sinuans, is a finback catshark of the family Proscylliidae, found in the western Indian Ocean, from Tanzania, South Africa, and Mozambique, at depths between 180 and 480 m. It can grow up to a length of 37 cm.

The African ribbontail catshark is ovoviviparous giving birth to two young per litter.

The African ribbontail catshark's coloration is grey-brown.
