= Magnificent catshark =

Scientific classification
- Kingdom: Animalia
- Phylum: Chordata
- Class: Chondrichthyes
- Subclass: Elasmobranchii
- Division: Selachii
- Order: Carcharhiniformes
- Family: Proscylliidae
- Genus: Proscyllium
- Species: P. magnificum

Binomial name
- Proscyllium magnificum Last & Vongpanich, 2004
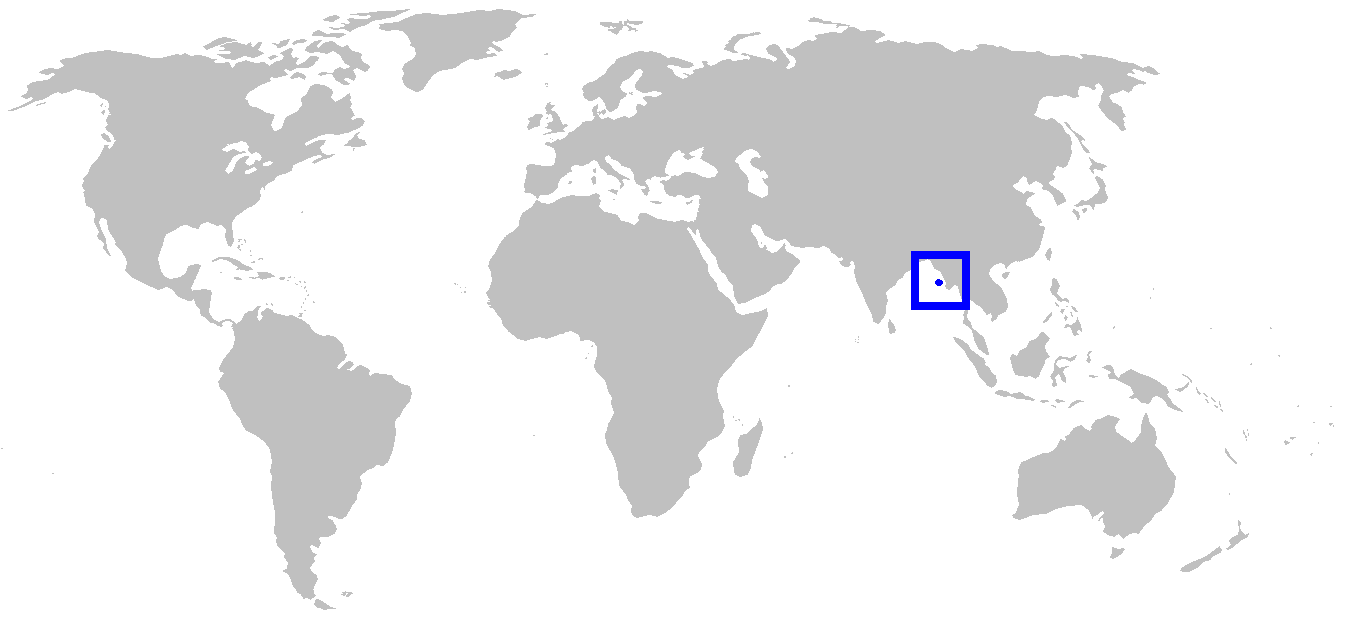
- Range of the magnificent catshark

Species of shark

The magnificent catshark or clown catshark (Proscyllium magnificum) is a species of finback catshark, belonging to the family Proscylliidae, known only from five specimens collected in the northern Andaman Sea near the edge of the Myanmar continental shelf. Its common names refer to its distinctive, elaborate color pattern of small and large dark spots, which include "clown faces" beneath each dorsal fin. Reaching 49 cm (19 in) in length, this species has a very slender body with a short, flattened head and a large lobe of skin in front of each nostril. The first dorsal fin is placed behind the pectoral fins but ahead of the pelvic fins.

== Taxonomy ==
The first specimens of the magnificent catshark were caught during a 1989 joint Thai-Burmese survey of the Myanmar continental shelf, and described by Peter Last and Vararin Vongpanich in a 2004 issue of the Phuket Marine Biological Center Research Bulletin. Its specific epithet is derived from the Latin magnificus ("noble" or "splendid"), and refers to its "strikingly beautiful" coloration. The type specimen is a female 49 cm (19 in) long, collected by Weera Pokapunt aboard the FRTV Chulabhorn.

== Distribution and habitat ==
The magnificent catshark is only known to occur in the northern Andaman Sea, off the coast of Myanmar. It inhabits water 141–144 m (463–472 ft) deep near the outer edge of the continental shelf.

== Description ==
The largest magnificent catshark on record was 49 cm (19 in) long. Its body is firm and very thin. The head is rather flattened and tapers to a short, slightly bell-shaped snout. The nostrils are sizable and divided by well-developed lobes of skin on the anterior margins; the incurrent openings are tubular in appearance. The large, horizontally oval eyes are placed moderately high on the head and bear rudimentary nictitating membranes (protective third eyelids); there are prominent ridges underneath. The mouth forms a long, wide arch with very short furrows at the corners. The teeth are tiny with typically three cusps in males and five cusps in females; the central cusp is the longest. The upper teeth are exposed when the mouth is closed. There are over 80 tooth rows in the upper jaw. There are five pairs of gill slits; papillae (nipple-like structures) are present on the gill arches.

The two dorsal fins are triangular with rounded apexes and gently concave trailing margins. The first dorsal fin is slightly larger than the second and originates behind the pectoral fin bases, while the second originates roughly above the rear of the anal fin base. The pectoral and pelvic fins have rounded tips, with the former much larger and broader than the latter. The pelvic fins of males have rather elongated, blunt-tipped claspers. The low, triangular anal fin is much smaller than either dorsal fin. The caudal fin is short, with a barely developed lower lobe and a distinct, enlarged tip on the upper lobe. The skin is covered by overlapping dermal denticles; the denticle crowns are narrow and placed on narrow stalks, with three teeth on their posterior margins. The coloration is distinctive, consisting of a dense variegated pattern of dark markings ranging from tiny to larger than the eye, on a brownish background. In particular, there are three spots above a fourth curved spot, forming a "clown face", beneath each dorsal fin. The spots extend onto the dorsal and anal fins, and the upper surfaces of the pectoral and pelvic fins. The underside varies from plain white to grayish with faint blotches.

== Biology and ecology ==
Virtually nothing is known of the natural history of the magnificent catshark. Males attain sexual maturity at around 47 cm (19 in) long.

== Human interactions ==
The conservation status of the magnificent catshark has not been evaluated by the International Union for Conservation of Nature (IUCN). Only five specimens are presently known to science.
