= Harlequin catshark =

Conservation status
- Least Concern (IUCN 3.1)

Scientific classification
- Kingdom: Animalia
- Phylum: Chordata
- Class: Chondrichthyes
- Subclass: Elasmobranchii
- Division: Selachii
- Order: Carcharhiniformes
- Family: Proscylliidae
- Genus: Ctenacis; Compagno, 1973
- Species: C. fehlmanni

Binomial name
- Ctenacis fehlmanni (S. Springer, 1968)
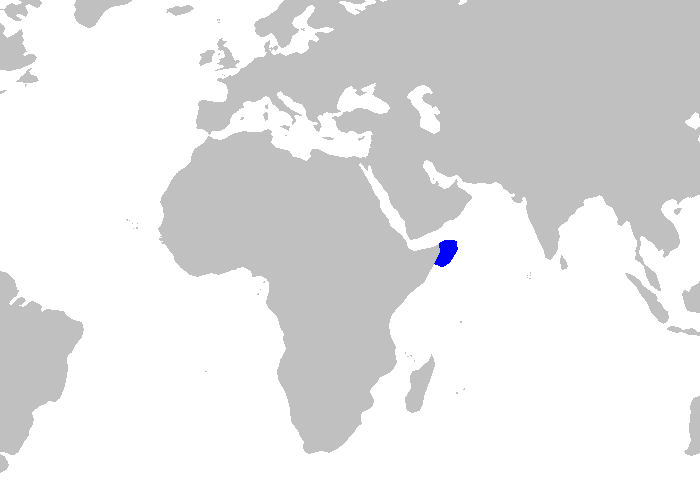
- Range of the harlequin catshark

Species of shark

The harlequin catshark (Ctenacis fehlmanni) is a species of finback catshark, part of the family Proscylliidae, and the only member of the genus Ctenacis. This shark is found in the western Indian Ocean off the coast of Somalia, at depths between 70 and 170 m. The 46 cm holotype was the only specimen that was ever found.
