= Theiler's disease =

- Other names: Idiopathic acute hepatitis disease (IAHD), serum-associated hepatitis, serum sickness, postvaccinal hepatitis
- Specialty: Veterinary medicine

Theiler's disease is a viral hepatitis that affects horses. It is one of the most common cause of acute hepatitis and liver failure in the horse.

== Signs and symptoms ==
There is a rapid onset of clinical signs over the period of 2–7 days, beginning with anorexia, lethargy, and hyperbilirubinemia (icterus and discolored urine). Signs of hepatic encephalopathy (ataxia, blindness, aggression, and coma) and fever can also occur. Other signs include photodermatitis, hemorrhagic diathesis, dependent edema, and colic. The reason for colic is unknown, but is thought to be due to rapid decrease in the size of the liver, and the increased risk of gastric impaction. Rarely, weight loss can occur.

== Cause ==
The most current theory is a result of a recent study that suggests it is caused by a pegivirus, referred to as Theiler's disease-associated virus (TDAV). Eight horses that had received prophylactic botulinum antitoxin and developed subsequent signs of Theiler's disease were subjected to a test for a viral infection based on RNA sequencing techniques. When TDAV was found, the original source of virus (the antitoxin) was injected into 4 additional healthy horses, with one displaying increased liver enzymes and all 4 having increased levels of TDAV, showing that the virus can be spread by inoculation. Measuring levels of virus in the originally infected horses has shown that the disease can become chronic, with some horses displaying low virus levels one year after initial infection. All horses that were initially negative remained so, suggesting that the virus is poorly transmitted horizontally.

However, not all horses that tested positive for this virus showed clinical signs, so additional causative factors such as immune mediated hypersensitivity or co-infections with other agents may be required to produce disease.

== Diagnosis ==
At present this can only be made definitively by liver biopsy or post mortem examination. Given the isolation of a causative virus it should soon be possible to diagnose this by serology, polymerase chain reaction or viral culture. On necropsy, the liver will be small, flaccid, and "dish-rag" in appearance. It has a mottled and bile stained surface. On microscopy there is marked centrilobular to midzonal hepatocellular necrosis and a mild to moderate mononuclear infiltrate. Mild to moderate bile duct proliferation may also be present. On radiology, the liver may be shrunken and difficult to visualize on ultrasound. Ascites may be present.

=== Lab tests ===
The most characteristic feature are elevated levels of gamma glutamyl transferase (100–300 IU/L), aspartate transaminase (>1000 IU/L) and sorbitol dehydrogenase, with AST levels > 4000 IU/L indicating a poor prognosis. High levels of unconjugated and total bilirubin, and serum bile acids, can be seen. Moderate to severe acidosis, leukocytosis, polycythaemia, increased creatine kinase and hyperammonemia may be present, and hemolysis can occur at the end stage. The prothrombin time (PT) and partial thromboplastin time (PTT) is often prolonged. Subclinical horses may only show elevated liver enzymes without any other clinical signs. Horses are rarely hypoglycemic, but blood glucose monitoring is ideal to indicate which horses may be benefited by glucose treatment.

=== Differential diagnosis ===
This is quite extensive and includes

- acute infectious hepatitis
- acute mycotoxicosis
- acute pyrrolizidine toxicosis
- haemolytic disease
- hepatotoxins

== Treatment ==
There is currently no specific therapy. Intravenous fluids and treatment of the hepatic encephalopathy may help. Increasing dietary levels of branched chain amino acids and feeding low protein diets can help signs of hepatic encephalopathy, which is often accomplished by feeding small amounts of grain and/or beet pulp, and removing high-protein feedstuffs such as alfalfa hay. Grazing on non-legume grass may be acceptable if it is late summer or fall, although the horse should only be permitted to eat in the evening so as to avoid photosensitization. Due to the risk of gastric impaction, stomach size should be monitored.

Sedation is minimized and used only to control behavior that could lead to injury of the animal and to allow therapeutic procedures, and should preferably involve a sedative other than a benzodiazepine. Stressing the animal should be avoided if at all possible. Plasma transfusions may be needed if spontaneous bleeding occurs, to replace clotting factors. Antibiotics are sometimes prescribed to prevent bacterial translocation from the intestines. Antioxidants such as vitamin E, B-complex vitamins, and acetylcysteine may be given. High blood ammonia is often treated with oral neomycin, often in conjunction with lactulose, metronidazole and probiotics, to decrease production and absorption of ammonia from the gastrointestinal tract.

== Prognosis ==
This depends on the degree of hepatocellular necrosis that has occurred. Decreases in the SDH and prothrombin time along with improvement in appetite are the best positive predictive indicators of recovery. GGT may remain elevated for weeks even if the horse is recovering. Horses that survive for greater than one week and that continue to eat usually recover. Cases with rapid progression of clinical signs, uncontrollable encephalopathy, haemorrhage or haemolysis have a poor prognosis. Horses that display clinical signs have a mortality rate of 50–90%.

== Epidemiology ==
This condition most commonly occurs after the administration of a horse origin biological agent such as equine-derived antiserum, and usually occurs 4–10 weeks after the event. Diseases that have been vaccinated against using equine-origin antiserum, resulting in subsequent Theiler's disease, include: African horse sickness, Eastern and Western Equine Encephalitis, Bacillus anthracis, tetanus antitoxin, Clostridium perfringens, Clostridium botulinum, Streptococcus equi subspecies equi, Equine influenza, Equine herpesvirus type 1, pregnant mare's serum, and plasma. Although it occurs sporadically, It appears to be spreadable within a premises, and there have been outbreaks occurring on farms involving multiple horses over several months. In the Northern hemisphere it is most common between August and November. It is seen almost exclusively in adult horses, and lactating broodmares given tetanus antitoxin post foaling may be more susceptible.

== History ==
This disease was described in 1919 by Arnold Theiler, a South African veterinary surgeon, after vaccinating horses against African horse sickness using a live virus vaccine and equine antiserum. It was later described in the United States after vaccinating horses for Eastern Equine Encephalitis, again using live virus vaccines and equine-derived antiserum. It has since been reported throughout North America and Europe.
