= Proscyllium venustum =

Scientific classification
- Kingdom: Animalia
- Phylum: Chordata
- Class: Chondrichthyes
- Subclass: Elasmobranchii
- Division: Selachii
- Order: Carcharhiniformes
- Family: Proscylliidae
- Genus: Proscyllium
- Species: P. venustum

Binomial name
- Proscyllium venustum (S. Tanaka, 1912)

Species of shark

The spotted smooth dogfish (Proscyllium venustum) is a finback catshark of the family Proscylliidae, found in the temperate northwest Pacific Ocean, in the Okinawa Trough. Little else is known about this harmless oviparous species.
