= Guaicovirus =

Virus classification
- (unranked): Virus
- Realm: Riboviria
- Kingdom: Orthornavirae
- Phylum: Kitrinoviricota
- Class: Flasuviricetes
- Order: Amarillovirales
- Family: Flaviviridae
- Genus: Guaicovirus
- Species: Guaicovirus culicis

Genus of viruses

Guaicovirus is a genus of viruses in the family Flaviviridae. The genus contains one species: Guaicovirus culicis, which contains the exemplar virus Guaico Culex virus (GCXV). Guaico Culex virus was reported in 2016 after isolation from Culex mosquitoes found near Guaico, Trinidad.

GCXV has a multipartite genome with separate genome segments enclosed in different enveloped viral capsids. Different virus isolates have four or five genome segments, though the fifth is not essential for viral proliferation. At least three genome segments, containing genes for non-structural proteins and capsid components, must enter a cell to infect it and replicate the virus successfully. Before the discovery of GCXV, multicomponent architecture had previously been reported only in viruses that infect plants and fungi, and had never been observed in an enveloped virus.
