= Viral protein =

Biological term

Diagram of how a virus capsid can be constructed using multiple copies of just two protein molecules

The term viral protein refers to both the products of the genome of a virus and any host proteins incorporated into the viral particle. Viral proteins are grouped according to their functions, and groups of viral proteins include structural proteins, nonstructural proteins, regulatory proteins, and accessory proteins. Viruses are non-living and do not have the means to reproduce on their own, instead depending on their host cell's machinery to do this. Thus, viruses do not code for most of the proteins required for their replication and the translation of their mRNA into viral proteins, but use proteins encoded by the host cell for this purpose.

== Viral structural proteins ==
Most viral structural proteins are components for the capsid and the envelope of the virus.

=== Capsid ===
The genetic material of a virus is stored within a viral protein structure called the capsid. The capsid is a "shield" that protects the viral nucleic acids from getting degraded by host enzymes or other types of pesticides or pestilences. It also functions to attach the virion to its host, and enable the virion to penetrate the host cell membrane. Many copies of a single viral protein or a number of different viral proteins make up the capsid, and each of these viral proteins are coded for by one gene from the viral genome. The structure of the capsid allows the virus to use a small number of viral genes to make a large capsid.

Several protomers, oligomeric (viral) protein subunits, combine to form capsomeres, and capsomeres come together to form the capsid. Capsomeres can arrange into an icosahedral, helical, or complex capsid, but in many viruses, such as the herpes simplex virus, an icosahedral capsid is assembled. Three asymmetric and nonidentical viral protein units make up each of the twenty identical triangular faces in the icosahedral capsid.

=== Viral envelope ===
The capsid of some viruses are enclosed in a membrane called the viral envelope. In most cases, the viral envelope is obtained by the capsid from the host cell's plasma membrane when a virus leaves its host cell through a process called budding. The viral envelope is made up of a lipid bilayer embedded with viral proteins, including viral glycoproteins. These viral glycoproteins bind to specific receptors and coreceptors on the membrane of host cells, and they allow viruses to attach onto their target host cells. Some of these glycoproteins include:

- Hemagglutinin, neuraminidase, and M2 protein in the influenza virus
- gp160, composed of subunits gp120 and gp41, in the human immunodeficiency virus (HIV).

Viral glycoproteins play a critical role in virus-to-cell fusion. Virus-to-cell fusion is initiated when viral glycoproteins bind to cellular receptors.

==== Viral membrane fusion proteins ====
The fusion of the viral envelope with the cellular membrane requires high energy to occur. Viral membrane fusion proteins act as catalysts to overcome this high energy barrier. Following viral glycoprotein binding to cellular receptors, viral membrane fusion proteins undergo a change in structure conformation. This change in conformation then facilitates the destabilization and fusion of the viral envelope with the cellular membrane by allowing fusion loops (FLs) or hydrophobic fusion peptides (FPs) on the viral envelope to interact with the cell membrane. Most viral membrane fusion proteins would end up in a hairpin-like conformation after fusion, in which FLs/FPs and the transmembrane domain are all on the same side of the protein.

Viral glycoproteins and their three-dimensional structures, before and after fusion, have allowed a wide range of structural conformations to be discovered. Viral membrane fusion proteins have been grouped into four different classes, and each class is identified by characteristic structural conformations:

- Class I: Post-fusion conformation has a distinct central coiled-coil structure composed of signature trimer of α-helical hairpins. An example of a Class I viral fusion protein is the HIV glycoprotein, gp41.
- Class II: Protein lacks the central coiled-coil structure. Contains a characteristic elongated β- sheet ectodomain structure that refolds to give a trimer of hairpins. Examples of class II viral fusion proteins include the dengue virus E protein, and the west nile virus E protein.
- Class III: Structural conformation is a combination of features from Class I and Class II viral membrane fusion proteins. An example of a Class III viral fusion protein is the rabies virus glycoprotein, G.
- Class IV: Class IV viral fusion proteins are fusion-associated small transmembrane (FAST) proteins. They do not form trimers of hairpins or hairpin structures themselves, and they are the smallest known viral fusion proteins. FAST proteins are coded for by members of the nonenveloped reoviridae family of viruses.

== Viral nonstructural proteins ==
Viral nonstructural proteins are proteins coded for by the genome of the virus and are expressed in infected cells. However, these proteins are not assembled in the virion. During the replication of viruses, some viral nonstructural proteins carry out important functions that affect the replication process itself. Similarly, during the assembly of viruses, some of these proteins also carry out important functions that affect the assembly process. Some of these viral nonstructural protein functions are replicon formation, immunomodulation, and transactivation of viral structural protein encoding genes.

=== Replicon formation ===
Viral nonstructural proteins interact with host cell proteins to form the replicon, otherwise known as the replication complex. In the hepatitis C virus, viral nonstructural proteins interact with cellular vesicle membrane transport protein, hVAP-33, to assemble the replicon. Viral nonstructural 4b (NS4B) protein alters the host cell's membrane and starts the formation process of the replication complex. Other viral nonstructural proteins such as NS5A, NS5B, and NS3, are also recruited to the complex, and NS4B interacts with them and binds to viral RNA.

=== Immunomodulation ===
The immune response of a host to an infected cell can be adjusted through the immunomodulatory properties of viral nonstructural proteins. Many species of large DNA viruses encode proteins which subvert host immune response, allowing proliferation of the virus. Such proteins hold potential in developing new bio-pharmaceutical treatments for inflammatory disease in humans, as the proteins have been proven to subvert inflammatory immune mediators. Viral nonstructural protein NS1 in the West Nile virus prevents complement activation through its binding to a complement control protein, factor H. As a result, complement recognition of infected cells is reduced, and infected cells remain unharmed by the host's immune system.

=== Regulatory proteins ===
Viral regulatory proteins have a wide range of functions. Generally, they control and influence expression of the viral genome, including viral structural gene transcription rates. They may also influence endogenous functions of the host cell, such as the regulation of its genes, and apoptosis.

== Accessory proteins ==
Viral accessory proteins (also known as auxiliary proteins or viral accessory gene products) are generally defined as viral proteins modify the properties of the mature virion rather than influencing gene expression or other functions. Typically, they bind to the capsid structures of mature or nearly mature virions, contributing to the infection cycle and modifying the existing viral structure, including facilitating or blocking host interactions.

They are conventionally split into "decoration proteins" which bind to the surface of mature or nearly mature virions, and "cementing proteins" which have the additional feature of physically stabilizing the virion's structure. However, modern virological research has increasingly blurred the boundary between these groups due to the additional stabilizing function of cementing proteins being observed in many instaces of proteins defined as decoration. The D capsid decoration protein of lambda phage and the decoration protein gp20 of Shingella-infecting virus Sf14 both have stabilizing roles despite their classification. Accessory proteins in general are very difficult to crystallize for structural analysis due to their flexibility, which is needed to bind multiple capsid proteins for either of their general roles.

== Endogenous retroviral proteins ==
Syncytin is an endogenous retrovirus protein that has been endogenized in the mammalian genome to allow membrane fusion in placental morphogenesis.
