= Pegivirus =

Virus classification
- (unranked): Virus
- Realm: Riboviria
- Kingdom: Orthornavirae
- Phylum: Kitrinoviricota
- Class: Flasuviricetes
- Order: Amarillovirales
- Family: Hepaciviridae
- Genus: Pegivirus

Species
- See text

Genus of viruses

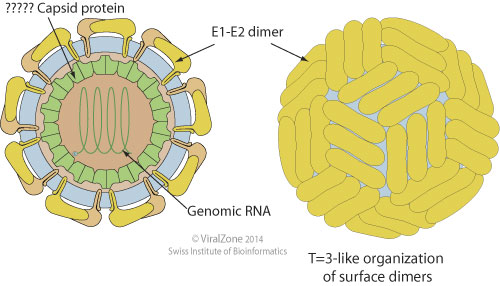
Schematic drawing of a Pegivirus virion (cross section and side view)

Pegivirus is a genus of single positive-stranded RNA viruses in the family Hepaciviridae. The name is a derived one: "Pe" stands for "persistent" and "g" is a reference to Hepatitis G, a former name of the C species.

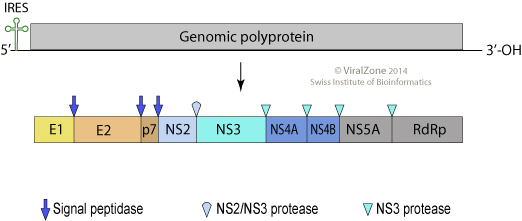
Pegivirus genome

== Taxonomy ==
Eleven named species are within the genus Pegivirus. Isolates belonging to the species Pegivirus C are monophyletic and show < 50% nucleotide (55% amino acid) sequence divergence between aligned sequences from the polyprotein from each other. However, all differ by >50% nucleotide (>55% amino acid) divergence from other members of this genus. Pegiviruses assigned to this species (Pegivirus A) originate from primate host species (humans, chimpanzees and several New World monkey species). The sequence U22303 has been assigned as the type member of the species, as this was the first pegivirus to be described for this species. Terminology to describe viruses with different hosts has not been approved by the International Committee on Taxonomy of Viruses; however, Pegivirus A viruses have been called HPgV for human pegivirus, SPgV for new world simian pegiviruses, and SPgVcpz for chimpanzee simian virus.

A second species within the pegiviruses is termed Pegivirus B. Only one virus was included in the naming proposal, which was a complete genome of a virus found in the bat species Pteropus giganteus. This sequence differs by >50% nucleotide (>55% amino acid) divergence from all proposed members of the primate-derived Pegivirus C species that originate from primate host species (humans, chimpanzees, and several New World monkey species). The sequence GU566734 has been assigned as the type member of the species, as this was the first pegivirus to be described for this species.

The use of deep sequencing technologies has identified additional viruses that differ from Pegivirus B species by >50% nucleotide (>55% amino acid) and Pegivirus C in rodents, horses, and in different bat species, and Old World monkeys and the number of Pegivirus species has been expanded to eleven.

=== Revised taxonomy ===
The species known in 2016 have since then been classified into 11 species—Pegivirus A–K.

In 2023, the species were renamed and given binomial names. They are listed hereafter, followed by their former names and viruses included in the species:

- Pegivirus caballi, previously called Pegivirus E, includes the virus Equine pegivirus
- Pegivirus carolliae, previously called Pegivirus F, includes the virus Bat pegivirus
- Pegivirus columbiaense, previously called Pegivirus H, includes the virus Human pegivirus 2
- Pegivirus equi, previously called Pegivirus D, includes the virus Theiler’s disease-associated virus
- Pegivirus hominis, previously called Pegivirus C, includes the virus GBV-C
- Pegivirus neotomae, previously called Pegivirus J, includes the virus Rodent pegivirus
- Pegivirus platyrrhini, previously called Pegivirus A, includes the virus GBV-A
- Pegivirus pteropi, previously called Pegivirus B, includes the virus GBV-D
- Pegivirus scotophili, previously called Pegivirus G, includes the virus Bat pegivirus
- Pegivirus sturnirae, previously called Pegivirus I, includes the virus Bat pegivirus
- Pegivirus suis, previously called Pegivirus K, includes the virus Porcine pegivirus

== History ==
- In 1967, experimental inoculation of serum from a thirty four year old surgeon (George Barker) with acute hepatitis into tamarins was reported to have resulted in hepatitis.
- In 1995, two new members of the family Flaviviridae (GBV-A and GBV-B) were identified in tamarins that developed hepatitis following inoculation with the 11th GB passage. A number of GBV-A variants were later identified in wild New World monkeys that were captured.
- Subsequently in 1995, a human virus was identified [GBV-C or hepatitis G virus (HGV)].
- A more distantly related virus (GBV-D) was later discovered in the bat (Pteropus giganteus).
- The genus Pegivirus was proposed in 2011. GBV-B was assigned to the genus Hepacivirus, whereas GBV-A together with GBV-C were assigned to the new genus Pegivirus.
- In 2016 the Pegivirus genus was divided into 11 species – pegiviruses A–K with GBV-C classified under pegivirus C species.
- In 2026, Pegivirus was reassigned to a new family, Hepaciviridae.

== Notes ==
- Theiler's disease — a form of equine hepatitis — also appears to be caused by a pegivirus—Theiler disease–associated virus.
- Human hepegivirus 1 or Human Pegivirus 2 (HPgV2) is a virus isolated from 2 multiply transfused hemophiliacs and two transfused patients. This virus appears to belong to a new clade in the Pegiviruses.
- A related virus has been isolated from the graceful catshark (Proscyllium habereri).
- The human pegiviruses appear to be related to the nonhuman primate species.
- Researchers in 2019 described Human pegivirus-1 as a "cause of human encephalitis (Leukoencephalitis)"; as well as sexually and mother-to-child transmissible.
- Another virus—rodent pegavirus—has been isolated from the white throated woodrat (Neotoma albigula).
- A pegivirus (equine pegivirus) has also been isolated from a horse.
