= Cuban ribbontail catshark =

Conservation status
- Least Concern (IUCN 3.1)

Scientific classification
- Kingdom: Animalia
- Phylum: Chordata
- Class: Chondrichthyes
- Subclass: Elasmobranchii
- Division: Selachii
- Order: Carcharhiniformes
- Family: Proscylliidae
- Genus: Eridacnis
- Species: E. barbouri

Binomial name
- Eridacnis barbouri (Bigelow & Schroeder, 1944)
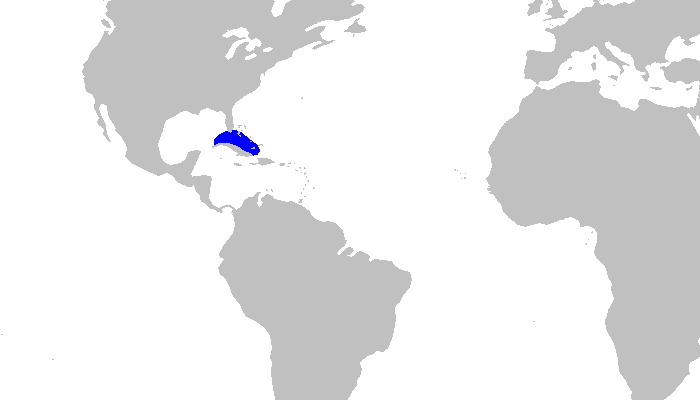

Species of shark

The Cuban ribbontail catshark (Eridacnis barbouri), is a finback catshark of the family Proscylliidae, found off western central Atlantic Ocean at depths of between 430 and 613 m. It can grow up to a length of 34 cm.

The Cuban ribbontail catshark is ovoviviparous.
