= Hepatitis C virus nonstructural protein 4B =

Nonstructural protein 4B (NS4B) is a viral protein found in the hepatitis C virus. With a mass of 27 kDa, it is likely involved in the formation of intracellular membrane structures that enable virus replication.
