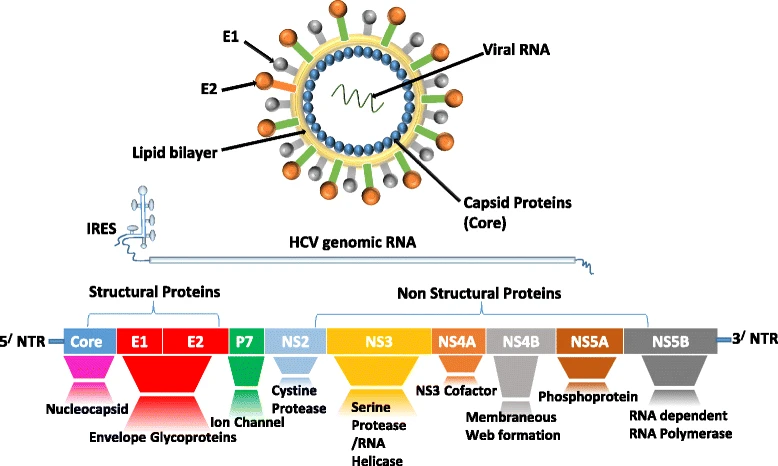
- Orthohepacivirus structure and genome

Virus classification
- (unranked): Virus
- Realm: Riboviria
- Kingdom: Orthornavirae
- Phylum: Kitrinoviricota
- Class: Flasuviricetes
- Order: Amarillovirales
- Family: Hepaciviridae
- Genus: Orthohepacivirus

Synonyms
- Hepacivirus; Hepatitis C-like viruses; Hepatitis virus C group

= Orthohepacivirus =

Genus of viruses

Orthohepacivirus, formerly called Hepacivirus, is a genus of positive-strand RNA viruses in the family Hepaciviridae. The hepatitis C virus (HCV), in species Orthohepacivirus hominis, infects humans and is associated with hepatitis and hepatocellular carcinoma. There are fourteen species in the genus which infect a range of other vertebrate.

== History ==
Hepatitis C virus (HCV), which is the causative agent of hepatitis C in humans, was discovered in 1989. Eight genotypes (1–8) and eighty-six subtypes (1a, 1b etc.) of hepatitis C virus have been named.

GBV-B virus (also known as GB virus B) discovered in 1995 is capable of infecting New World monkeys, in particular tamarins. Like HCV it is transmitted by the blood-borne route and similar to HCV it is associated with the viral hepatitis. However GBV-B has never been identified in wild animals and its natural host is not known.

== Structure ==
Viruses in the genus Orthohepacivirus are enveloped and have spherical icosahedral-like geometries with pseudo T=3 symmetry. The virus particle diameter is around 50 nm. Genomes are linear, non-segmented, and around 10,000 nucleotides in length.

== Life cycle ==
Entry into the host cell is achieved by attachment of the viral envelope protein E to host receptors, which mediates clathrin-mediated endocytosis. Replication follows the positive-strand RNA virus replication model. Positive strand RNA virus transcription is the method of transcription. Translation takes place by viral initiation. Humans and other vertebrate serve as the natural host. Transmission routes are sexual, blood, and contact.

| Genus | Host details | Tissue tropism | Entry details | Release details | Replication site | Assembly site | Transmission |
|---|---|---|---|---|---|---|---|
| Orthohepacivirus | Humans | Epithelium: skin; epithelium: kidney; epithelium: intestine; epithelium: testes | Clathrin-mediated endocytosis | Secretion | Cytoplasm | Cytoplasm | Sex; blood |

== Taxonomy ==
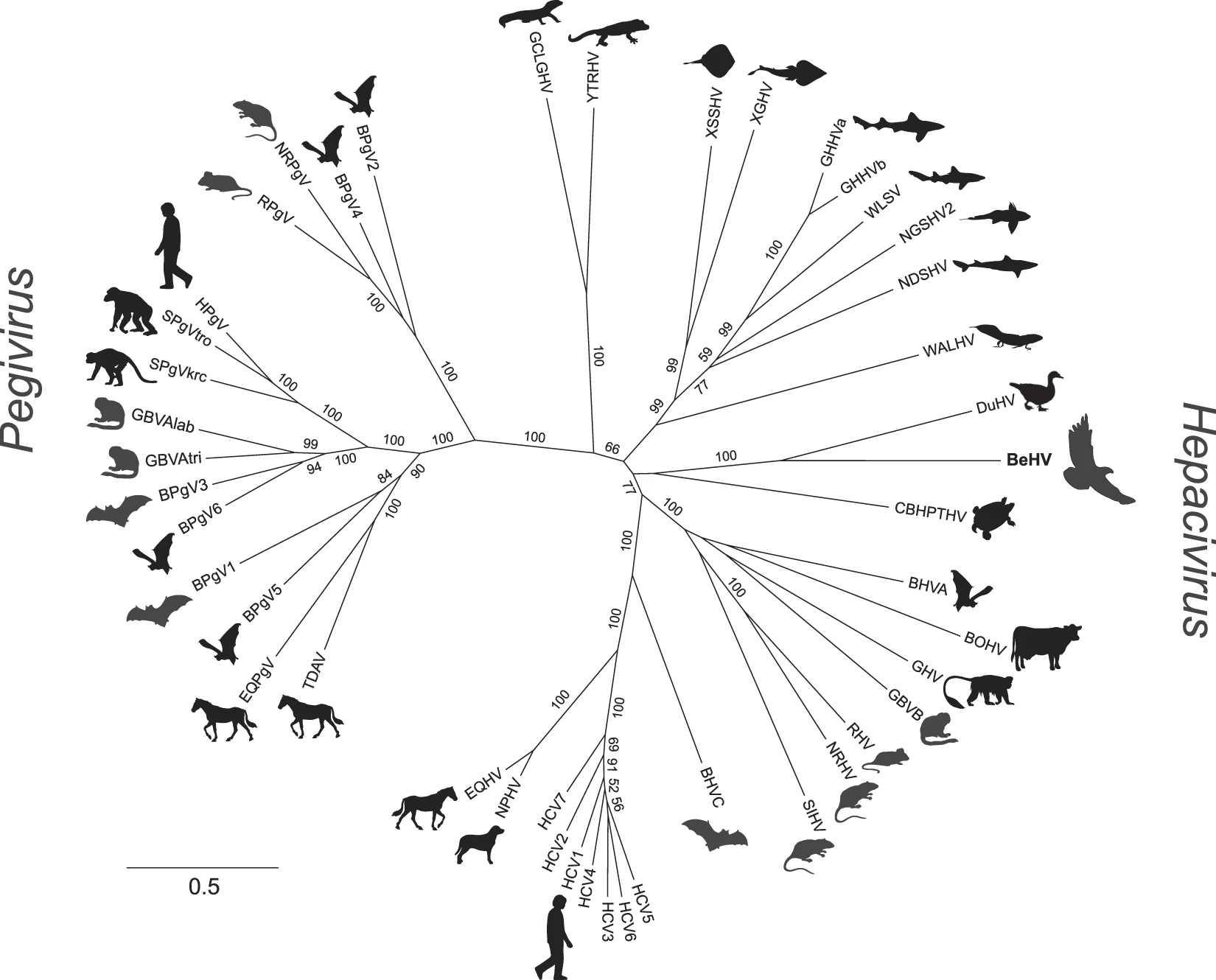
Phylogenetic tree of orthohepaciviruses and pegiviruses with their host

The genus contains the following species, listed by scientific name and followed by viruses that belong to the species:

- Orthohepacivirus bovis (bovine hepacivirus)
- Orthohepacivirus colobi (Guereza hepacivirus)
- Orthohepacivirus equi (canine hepacivirus, equine hepacivirus)
- Orthohepacivirus glareoli (rodent hepacivirus-RMU10-3382/GER/2010)
- Orthohepacivirus hominis (hepatitis C virus)
- Orthohepacivirus macronycteridis (bat hepacivirus-PDB-829)
- Orthohepacivirus myodae (rodent hepacivirus-NLR07-oct70)
- Orthohepacivirus norvegici (Norway rat hepacivirus 2)
- Orthohepacivirus otomopis (bat hepacivirus-PDB-491.1)
- Orthohepacivirus peromysci (rodent hepacivirus-339)
- Orthohepacivirus platyrrhini (GBV-B)
- Orthohepacivirus ratti (Norway rat hepacivirus 1)
- Orthohepacivirus rhabdomysis (rodent hepacivirus-SAR-3/RSA/2008)
- Orthohepacivirus vittatae (bat hepacivirus-PDB-112)

== Additional information ==
Additional orthohepaciviruses have been described from bats, rodents including bank voles, horses, and dogs. Rodent hepacivirus is found in the deer mouse (Peromyscus maniculatus). Viruses related to orthohepaciviruses have been found in bamboo rats (Rhizomys pruinosus) and long-tailed ground squirrels Spermophilus undulatus.

Cattle are a host for viruses of the species Orthohepacivirus bovis. The viruses most closely related to Orthohepacivirus hominis are the equine hepaciviruses of the species Orthohepacivirus equi. There are at least two subtypes of equine hepacivirus. Hepacivirus A infecting horses has also been found in donkeys.

A virus related to the orthohepaciviruses has been isolated from bald eagles (Haliaeetus leucocephalus). Another unclassified virus in this taxon is duck hepacivirus-like virus. A virus related to orthohepaciviruses has been isolated from the graceful catshark (Proscyllium habereri). The virus – Jogalong virus – has been described that appears to belong to another species in this genus.
