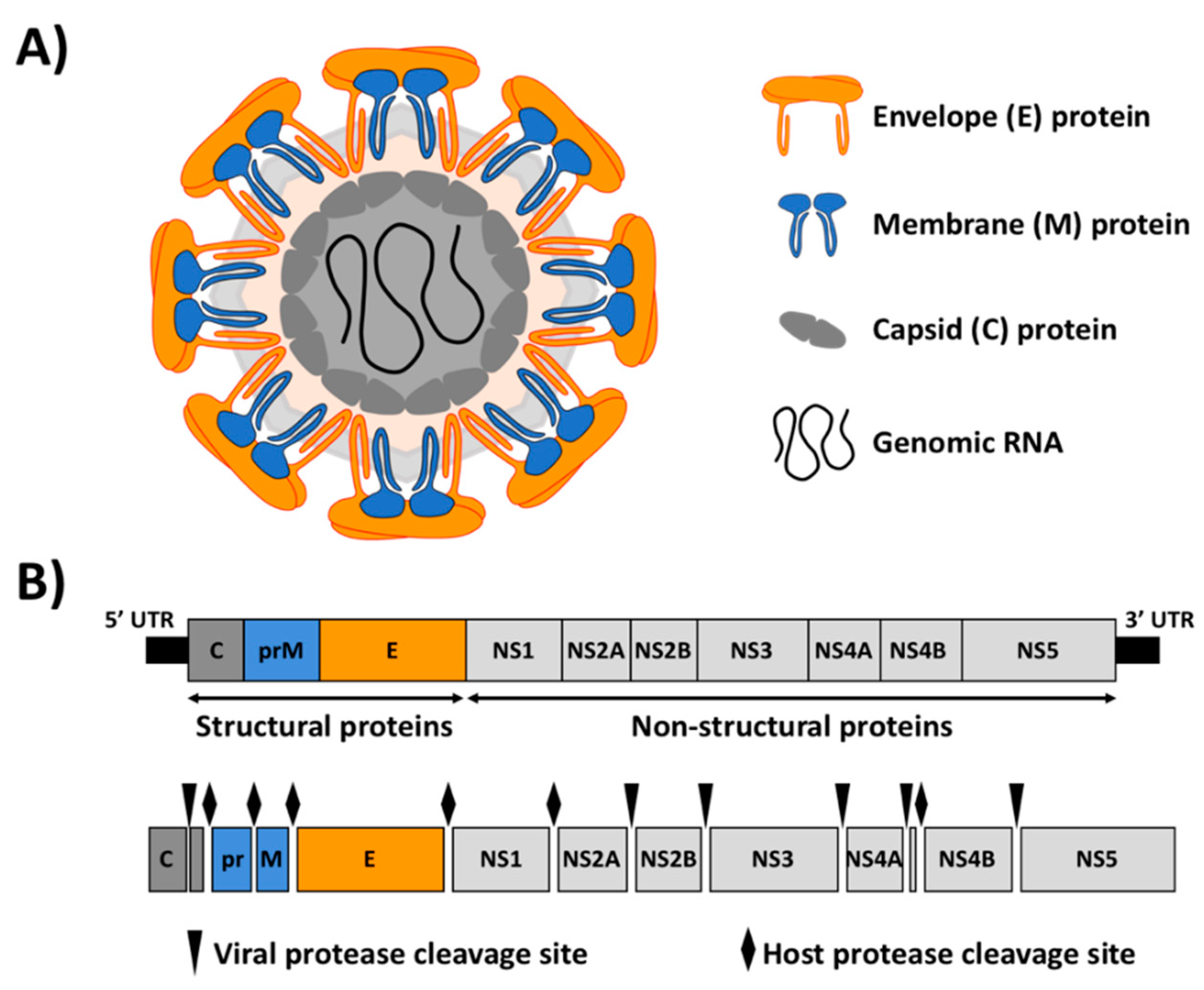
- Zika virus virion structure and genome

Virus classification
- (unranked): Virus
- Realm: Riboviria
- Kingdom: Orthornavirae
- Phylum: Kitrinoviricota
- Class: Flasuviricetes
- Order: Amarillovirales
- Family: Flaviviridae

Genera
- See text

= Flaviviridae =

Family of viruses

Flaviviridae, commonly flavivirus, flaviviral, and flaviviruses, is a family of enveloped positive-strand RNA viruses which mainly infect mammals and birds. They are primarily spread through arthropod vectors (mainly ticks and mosquitoes). The family gets its name from the yellow fever virus; flavus is Latin for "yellow", and yellow fever in turn was named because of its propensity to cause jaundice in victims. The family has five genera. Diseases associated with the group include: hemorrhagic fever, encephalitis, and the birth defect microcephaly.

== Structure ==
Virus particles are enveloped and spherical with icosahedral-like geometries that have pseudo T=3 symmetry. They are about 40–60 nm in diameter.

== Life cycle ==
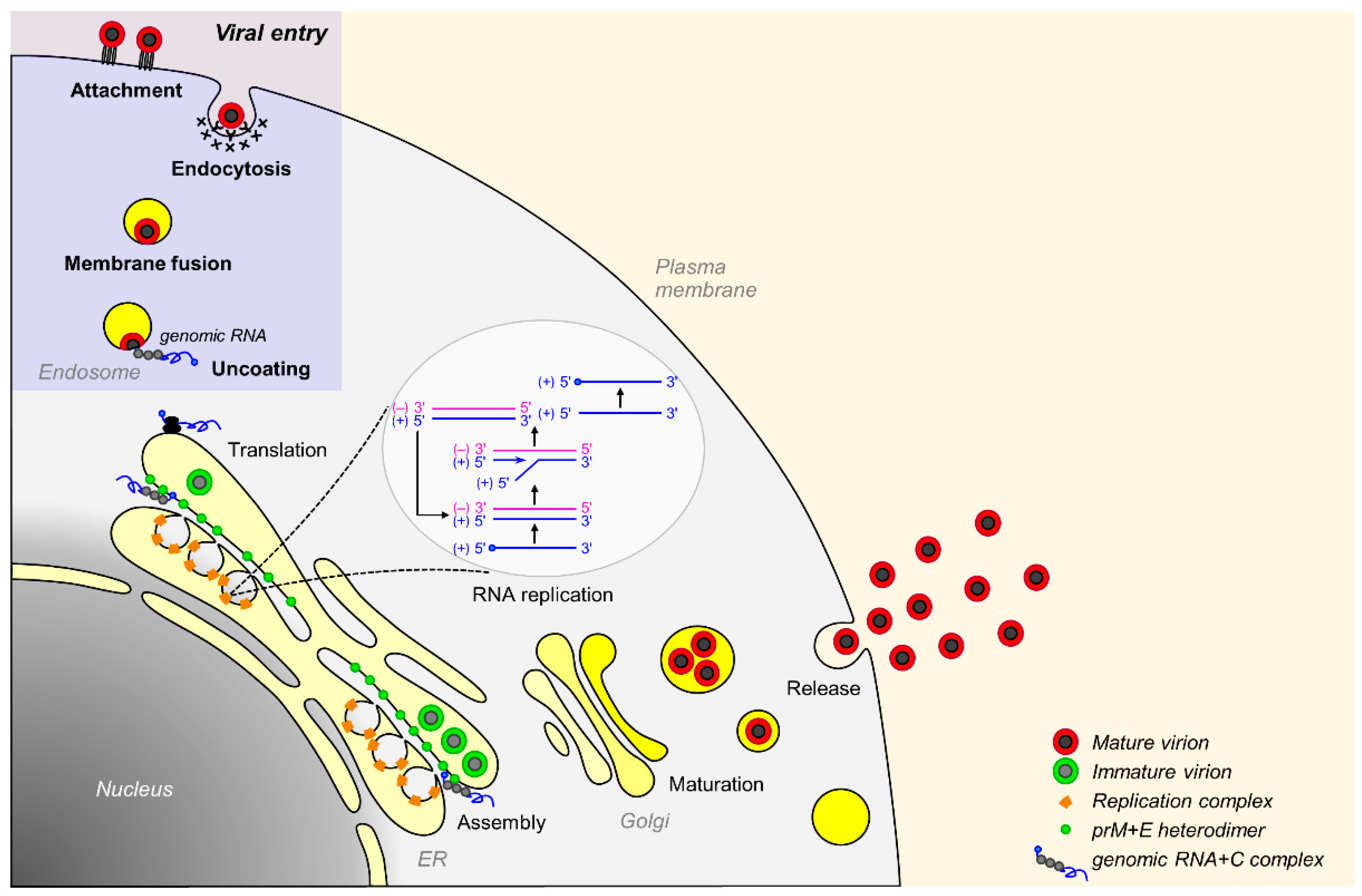
Life cycle of Japanese encephalitis virus (JEV)

Viral replication is cytoplasmic. Entry into the host cell is achieved by attachment of the viral envelope protein E to host receptors, which mediates clathrin-mediated endocytosis. Replication follows the positive-stranded RNA virus replication model. Positive-stranded RNA virus transcription is the method of transcription. Translation takes place by viral initiation. The virion assembles by budding through intracellular membranes and exits the host cell by exocytosis.

== Host range and evolutionary history ==
A wide variety of natural hosts are used by different members of the Flaviviridae, including fish, mammals including humans and various invertebrates, such as those specific to mollusks and crustaceans. The genomes of these flaviviruses show close synteny with that of the yellow fever virus. One flavivirus, the Wenzhou shark flavivirus, infects both Pacific spadenose sharks (Scoliodon macrorhynchos) and Gazami crabs (Portunus trituberculatus) with overlapping ranges, raising the possibility of a two-host marine lifecycle. However, another clade of flavivirus, the insect-specific flaviviruses, have genomes that do not demonstrate strong synteny with any of these groups, suggesting a complex evolutionary history.

Flavivirus endogenous viral elements, traces of flavivirus genomes integrated into the host's DNA, are found in many species, including a tadpole shrimp Lepidurus articus, the water flea Daphnia magna and a freshwater jellyfish Craspedacusta sowerbii, suggesting ancient coevolution between animal and flavivirus lineages. Many of the well-known members of the family causing disease in vertebrates are transmitted via arthropod vectors (ticks and mosquitoes).

== Taxonomy ==
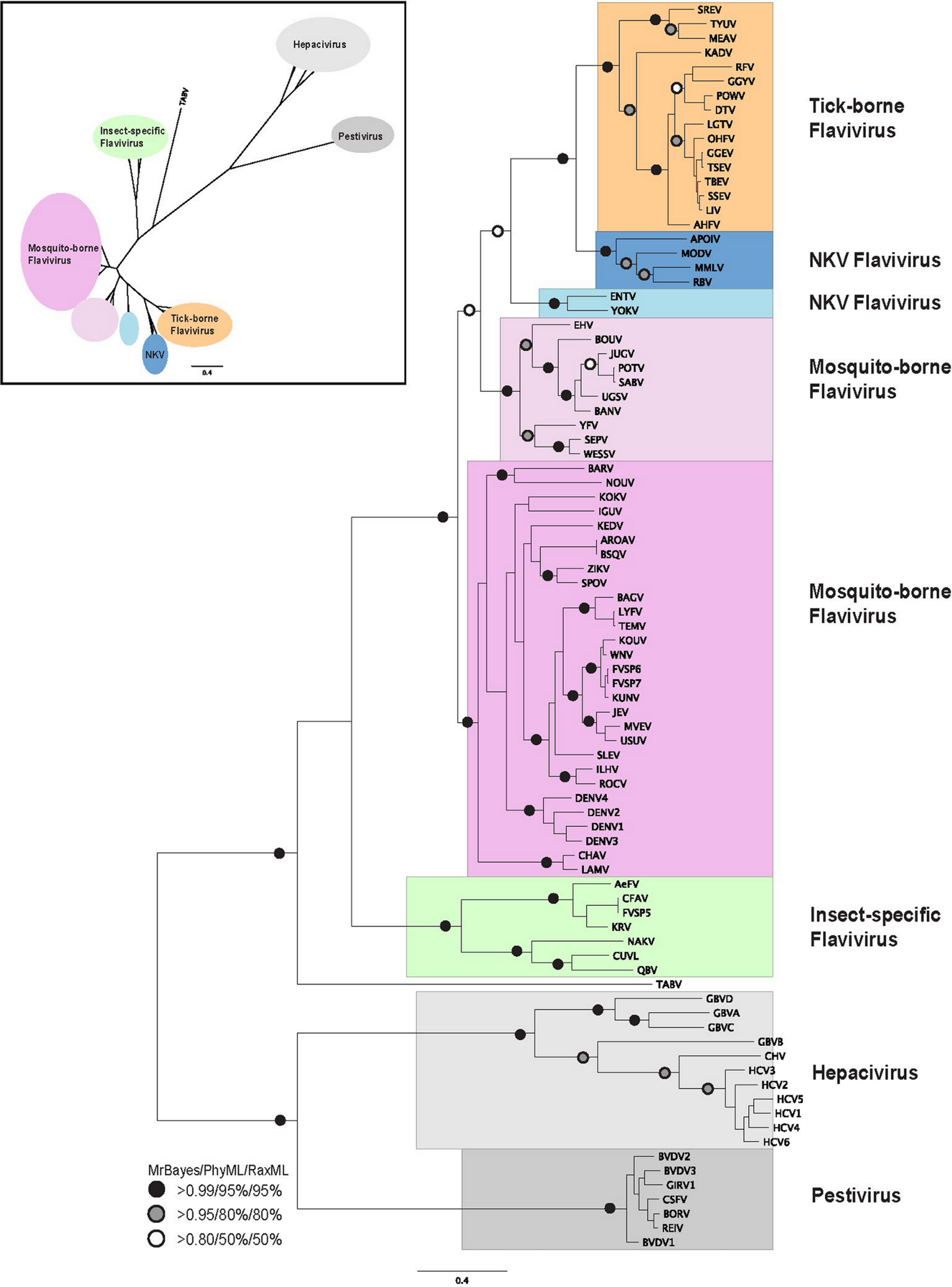
Phylogenetic tree of Flaviviridae using the NS3 protein sequences

The Flaviviridae are part of RNA virus supergroup II, which includes certain plant viruses and bacterial viruses. In 2022, the International Committee on Taxonomy of Viruses (ICTV) discussed in 2022 the common names such as flavivirus, flaviviral, and flaviviruses used for both the family and the genus Flavivirus. As more viruses particularly classified under separate genera became established, the names became confusing. The ICTV therefore resolved in 2023 that the genus Flavivirus should be replaced with Orthoflavivirus and that the common names can be used for the entire family. In 2026, the Flaviviridae family was reorganized, and the genera Hepacivirus, Pegivirus, and Pestivirus were moved to other families in the same order as Flaviviridae, Amarillovirales.

The family has the following genera:

- Guaicovirus
- Jingmenvirus
- Orthoflavivirus
- Tamanavirus
- Termitovirus

== Clinical importance ==
Major diseases caused by members of the family Flaviviridae include:

- Alkhurma hemorrhagic fever
- Dengue fever
- Japanese encephalitis
- Kyasanur Forest disease
- Murray Valley encephalitis
- Omsk hemorrhagic fever
- St. Louis encephalitis
- Tick-borne encephalitis
- West Nile encephalitis
- Yellow fever
- Zika fever
