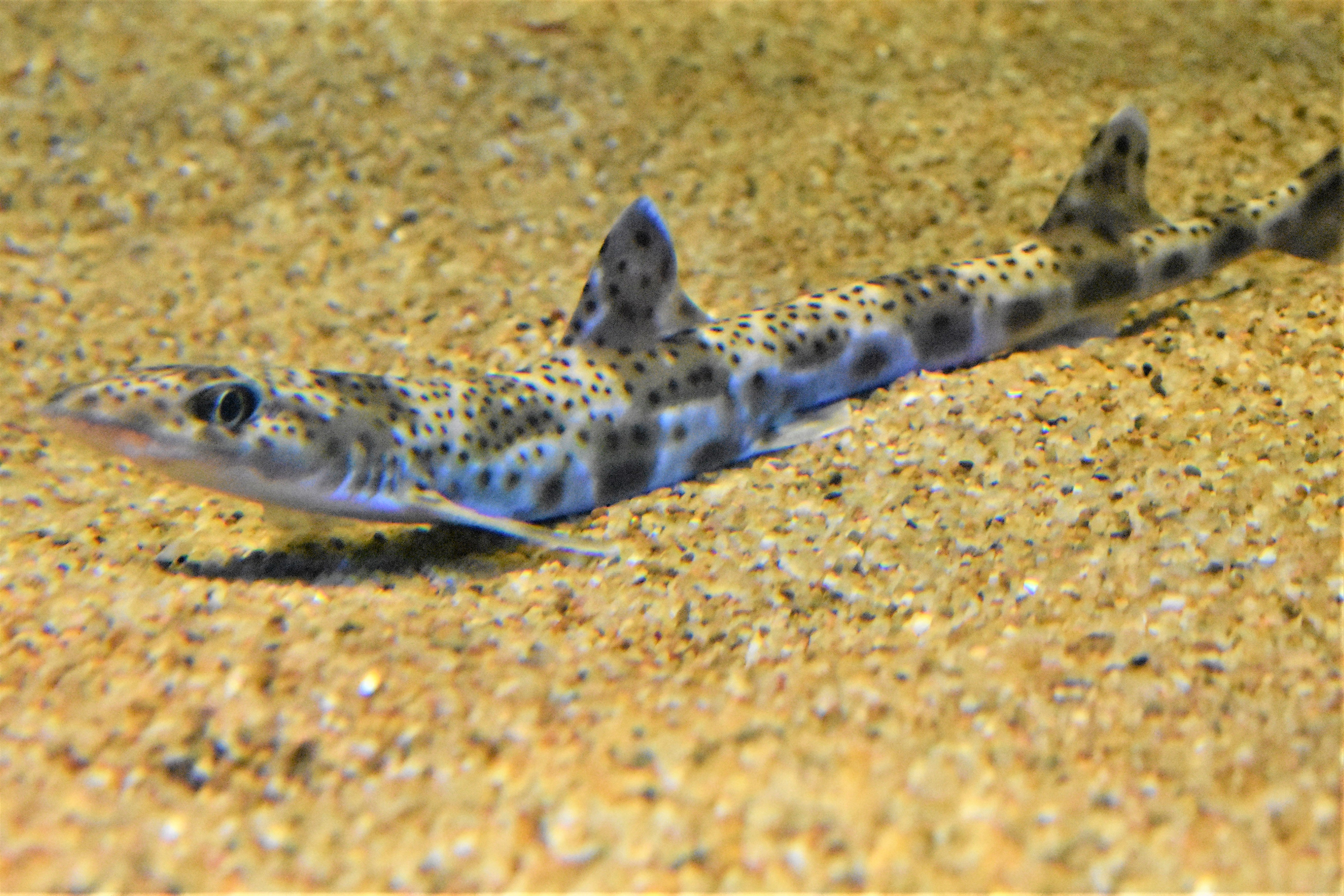

Conservation status
- Vulnerable (IUCN 3.1)

Scientific classification
- Kingdom: Animalia
- Phylum: Chordata
- Class: Chondrichthyes
- Subclass: Elasmobranchii
- Division: Selachii
- Order: Carcharhiniformes
- Family: Proscylliidae
- Genus: Proscyllium
- Species: P. habereri

Binomial name
- Proscyllium habereri Hilgendorf, 1904
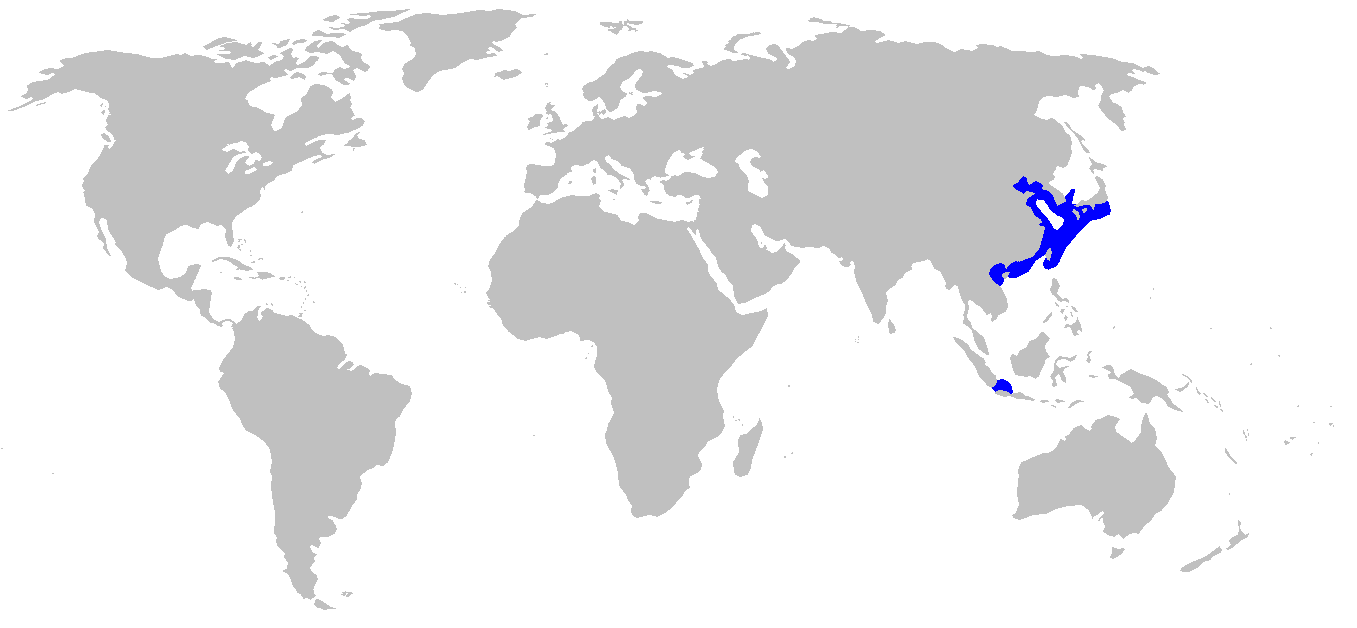
- Range of the graceful catshark

= Graceful catshark =

Species of shark

The graceful catshark (Proscyllium habereri) is a species of finback catshark, belonging to the family Proscylliidae. This shark is found in the western Pacific Ocean, from southeastern Japan to Vietnam and northwestern Java, at depths between 50 and 100 m. Females can reach a length of 65 cm.
