= WHO Disease Staging System for HIV Infection and Disease in Adults and Adolescents =

Medical classification for HIV/AIDS

WHO Disease Staging System for HIV Infection and Disease in Adults and Adolescents was first produced in 1990 by the World Health Organization and updated in September 2005. It is an approach for use in resource limited settings and is widely used in Africa and Asia and has been a useful research tool in studies of progression to symptomatic HIV disease.

Following infection with HIV, the rate of clinical disease progression varies enormously between individuals. Many factors such as host susceptibility and immune function, health care and co-infections, as well as factors relating to the viral strain may affect the rate of clinical disease progression.

== Revised World Health Organization (WHO) Clinical Staging of HIV/AIDS For Adults and Adolescents (2005) ==
(This is the interim African Region version for persons aged 15 years or more who have had a positive HIV antibody test or other laboratory evidence of HIV infection) (The United Nations defines adolescents as persons aged 10−19 years but for surveillance purposes, the category of adults and adolescents comprises people aged 15 years and over)

=== Primary HIV infection ===
- Asymptomatic
- Acute retroviral syndrome

=== Clinical stage 1 ===
- Asymptomatic
- Persistent generalized lymphadenopathy

=== Clinical stage 2 ===
- Moderate and unexplained weight loss (<10% of presumed or measured body weight)
- Recurrent respiratory tract infections (such as sinusitis, bronchitis, otitis media, pharyngitis)
- Herpes zoster
- Recurrent oral ulcerations
- Papular pruritic eruptions
- Angular cheilitis
- Seborrhoeic dermatitis
- Onychomycosis (fungal nail infections)

=== Clinical stage 3 ===
Conditions where a presumptive diagnosis can be made on the basis of clinical signs or simple investigations

- Unexplained chronic diarrhoea for longer than one month
- Unexplained persistent fever (intermittent or constant for longer than one month)
- Severe weight loss (>10% of presumed or measured body weight)
- Oral candidiasis
- Oral hairy leukoplakia
- Pulmonary tuberculosis (TB) diagnosed in last two years
- Severe presumed bacterial infections (e.g. pneumonia, empyema, meningitis, bacteraemia, pyomyositis, bone or joint infection)
- Acute necrotizing ulcerative stomatitis, gingivitis or periodontitis

Conditions where confirmatory diagnostic testing is necessary

- Unexplained anaemia (< 80 g/L), and or neutropenia (<500/μl) and or thrombocytopenia (<50 000/ μl) for more than one month

=== Clinical stage 4 ===
Conditions where a presumptive diagnosis can be made on the basis of clinical signs or simple investigations

- HIV wasting syndrome
- Pneumocystis pneumonia
- Recurrent severe or radiological bacterial pneumonia
- Chronic herpes simplex infection (orolabial, genital or anorectal of more than one month's duration)
- Esophageal candidiasis
- Extrapulmonary tuberculosis
- Kaposi's sarcoma
- Central nervous system toxoplasmosis
- HIV encephalopathy

Conditions where confirmatory diagnostic testing is necessary

- Extrapulmonary cryptococcosis including meningitis
- Disseminated non-tuberculous mycobacteria infection
- Progressive multifocal leukoencephalopathy
- Candida of trachea, bronchi or lungs
- Cryptosporidiosis
- Isosporiasis
- Visceral herpes simplex infection
- Cytomegalovirus (CMV) infection (retinitis or of an organ other than the liver, spleen or lymph nodes)
- Any disseminated mycosis (e.g. histoplasmosis, coccidioidomycosis, penicilliosis)
- Recurrent non-typhoidal salmonella sepsis
- Lymphoma (cerebral or B cell non-Hodgkin)
- Invasive cervical carcinoma
- Visceral leishmaniasis

== Original proposal in 1990 ==
=== Clinical Stage I ===
- Asymptomatic
- Generalised lymphadenopathy
- In some cases symptoms similar to those of cold flue would be manifested.

Performance scale: 1: asymptomatic, normal activity.

=== Clinical Stage II ===
- Weight loss, < 10% of body weight
- Minor mucocutaneous manifestations (seborrheic dermatitis, prurigo, fungal nail infections, recurrent oral ulcerations, angular cheilitis)
- Herpes zoster within the last five years
- Recurrent upper respiratory tract infections (i.e. bacterial sinusitis)

And/or performance scale 2: symptomatic, normal activity.

=== Clinical Stage III ===
- Weight loss, > 10% of body weight
- Unexplained chronic diarrhoea > 1 month
- Unexplained prolonged fever (intermittent or constant), > 1 month
- Oral [candidiasis] ([thrush])
- Oral hairy leucoplakia
- Pulmonary tuberculosis
- Severe bacterial infections (i.e. pneumonia, pyomyositis)

And/or performance scale 3: bedridden < 50% of the day during last month.

=== Clinical Stage IV ===
The declaration of AIDS

- HIV wasting syndrome *
- Pneumocystis carinii pneumonia
- Toxoplasmosis of the brain
- Cryptosporidiosis with diarrhoea > 1 month
- Cryptococcosis, extrapulmonary
- Cytomegalovirus disease of an organ other than liver, spleen or lymph node (ex: retinitis)
- Herpes simplex virus infection, mucocutaneous (>1 month) or visceral
- Progressive multifocal leucoencephalopathy
- Any disseminated endemic mycosis
- Candidiasis of esophagus, trachea, bronchi
- Atypical mycobacteriosis, disseminated or lungs
- Non-typhoid Salmonella septicemia
- Extrapulmonary tuberculosis
- Lymphoma
- Kaposi's sarcoma
- HIV encephalopathy **

And/or performance scale 4: bedridden > 50% of the day during last month.

(*) HIV wasting syndrome: weight loss of > 10% of body weight, plus either unexplained chronic diarrhoea (> 1 month) or chronic weakness and unexplained prolonged fever (> 1 month).

(**) HIV encephalopathy: clinical findings of disabling cognitive and/or motor dysfunction interfering with activities of daily living, progressing over weeks to months, in the absence of a concurrent illness or condition other than HIV infection which could explain the findings.
