= Hepatitis C virus envelope glycoprotein E2 =

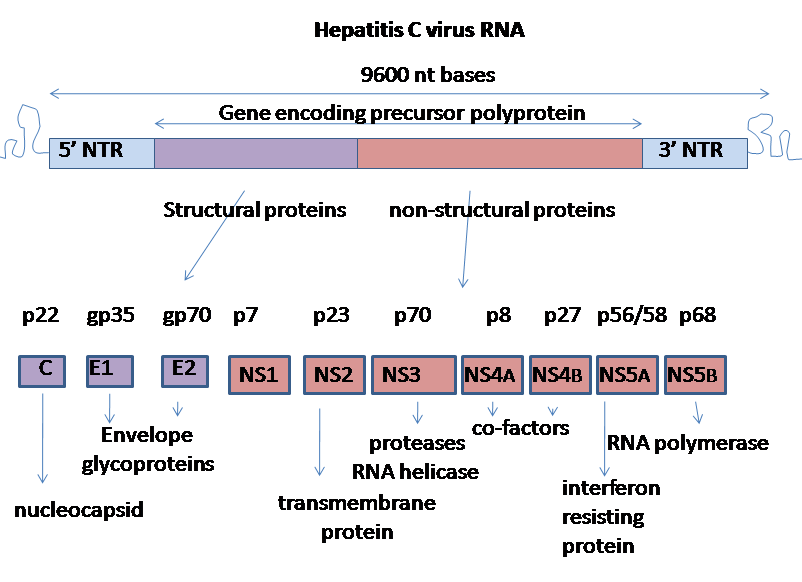
HCV genome

E2 is a viral structural protein found in the hepatitis C virus. It is present on the viral envelope and functions as a host receptor binding protein, mediating entry into host cells. It is a key target for the design of entry inhibitors and vaccine immunogens.
