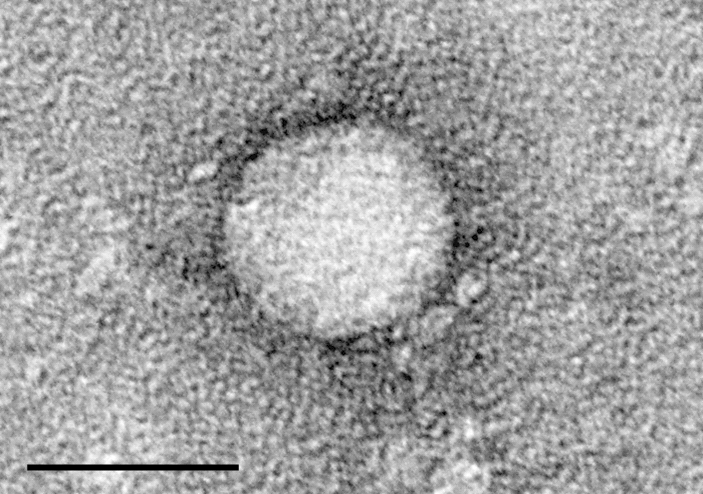
- Electron micrograph of Hepatitis C virus purified from cell culture. Scale bar = 50 nanometres

Virus classification
- (unranked): Virus
- Realm: Riboviria
- Kingdom: Orthornavirae
- Phylum: Kitrinoviricota
- Class: Flasuviricetes
- Order: Amarillovirales
- Family: Hepaciviridae
- Genus: Orthohepacivirus
- Species: Orthohepacivirus hominis

Synonyms
- Hepatitis C virus HCV human hepatitis C virus; Hepacivirus C; Hepacivirus hominis

= Hepatitis C virus =

Species of virus

The hepatitis C virus (HCV) is a small (55–65 nm in size), enveloped, positive-sense single-stranded RNA virus of the family Hepacivirus. The hepatitis C virus is the cause of hepatitis C and some cancers such as liver cancer (hepatocellular carcinoma, abbreviated HCC) and lymphomas in humans.

== Taxonomy ==
The hepatitis C virus belongs to the genus Orthohepacivirus, a member of the family Hepacivirus. Before 2011, it was considered to be the only member of this genus. However a member of this genus has been discovered in dogs: canine hepacivirus. There is also at least one virus in this genus that infects horses. Several additional viruses in the genus have been described in bats and rodents.

== Structure ==
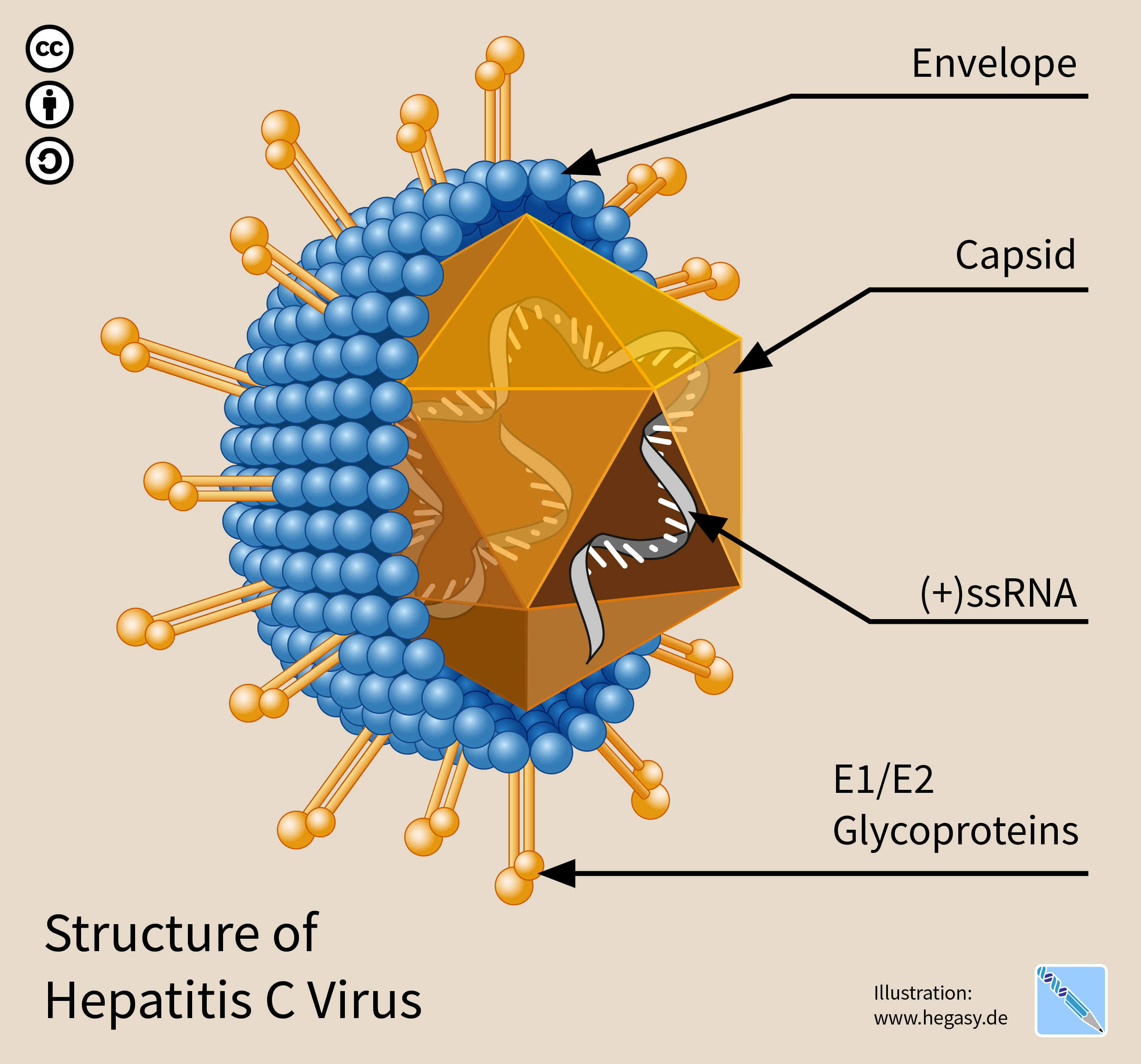
Structure of Hepatitis C Virus

The hepatitis C virus particle consists of a lipid membrane envelope that is 55 to 65 nm in diameter. Two viral envelope glycoproteins, E1 and E2, are embedded in the lipid envelope. They take part in viral attachment and entry into the cell. Within the envelope is an icosahedral core that is 33 to 40 nm in diameter. Inside the core is the RNA material of the virus.

=== E1 and E2 glycoproteins ===
E1 and E2 are covalently bonded when embedded in the envelope of HCV and are stabilized by disulfide bonds. E2 is globular and seems to protrude 6 nm out from the envelope membrane according to electron microscope images.

These glycoproteins play an important role in the interactions hepatitis C has with the immune system. A hypervariable region, the hypervariable region 1 (HVR1) can be found on the E2 glycoprotein. HVR1 is flexible and quite accessible to surrounding molecules. HVR1 helps E2 shield the virus from the immune system. It prevents CD81 from latching onto its respective receptor on the virus. In addition, E2 can shield E1 from the immune system. Although HVR1 is quite variable in amino acid sequence, this region has similar chemical, physical, and conformational characteristics across many E2 glycoproteins.

== Genome ==
Structure of the IRES located in the 5′-UTR of HCV

Hepatitis C virus has a positive sense single-stranded RNA genome. The genome consists of a single open reading frame that is 9,600 nucleotide bases long. This single open reading frame is translated to produce a single protein product, which is then further processed to produce smaller active proteins. This is why on publicly available databases, such as the European Bioinformatics Institute, the viral proteome only consists of 2 proteins.

At the 5′ and 3′ ends of the RNA are the untranslated regions (UTR), that are not translated into proteins but are important to translation and replication of the viral RNA. The 5′ UTR has a ribosome binding site or internal ribosome entry site (IRES) that initiates the translation of a very long protein containing about 3,000 amino acids. The core domain of the HCV IRES contains a four-way helical Holliday junction that is integrated within a predicted pseudoknot. The conformation of this core domain constrains the open reading frame's orientation for positioning on the 40S ribosomal subunit. The large pre-protein is later cleaved by cellular and viral proteases into the 10 smaller proteins that allow viral replication within the host cell, or assemble into the mature viral particles. Structural proteins made by the hepatitis C virus include Core protein, E1 and E2; nonstructural proteins include NS2, NS3, NS4A, NS4B, NS5A, and NS5B.

== Molecular biology ==
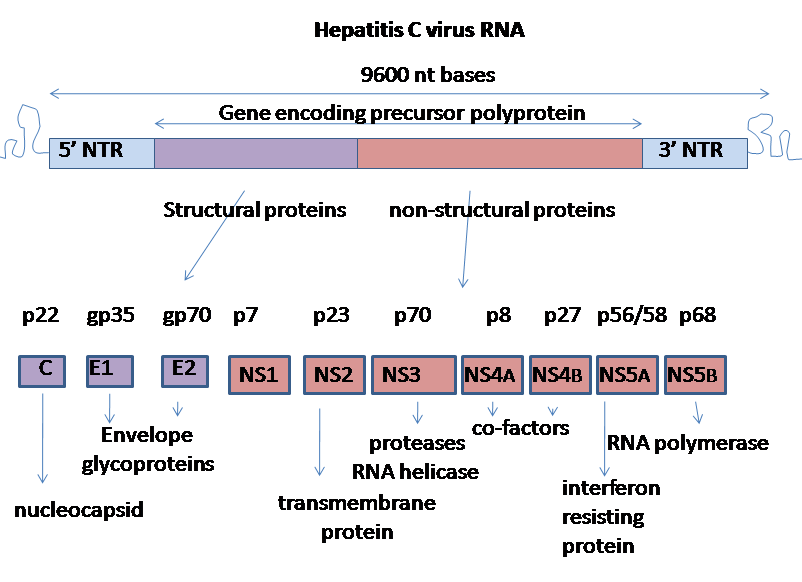
Genome organisation of hepatitis C virus

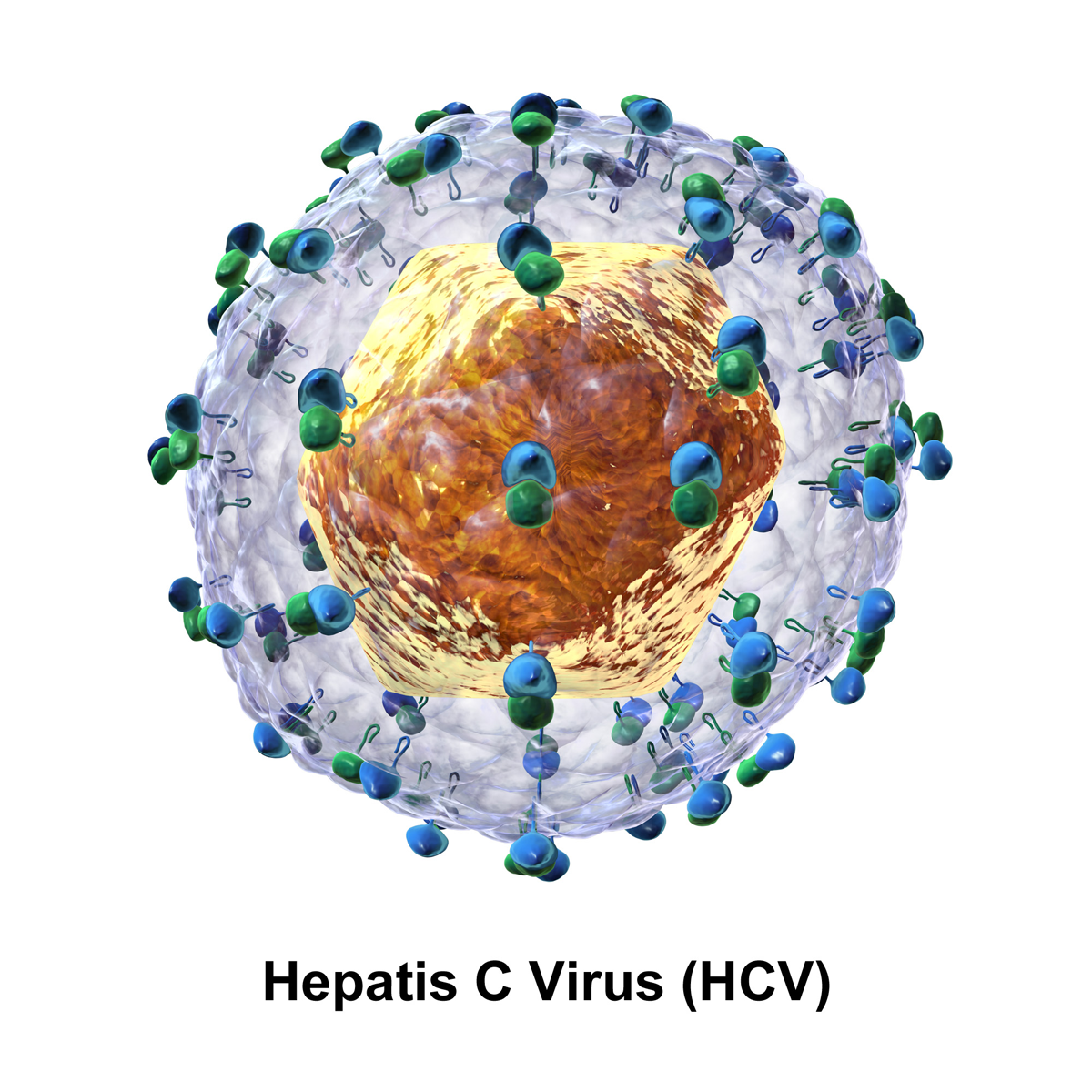
Diagram of the structure of the hepatitis C virus particle

The proteins of this virus are arranged along the genome in the following order: N terminal-core-envelope (E1)–E2–p7-nonstructural protein 2 (NS2)–NS3–NS4A–NS4B–NS5A–NS5B–C terminal. The mature nonstructural proteins (NS2 to NS5B) generation relies on the activity of viral proteinases. The NS2/NS3 junction is cleaved by a metal-dependent autocatalytic proteinase encoded within NS2 and the N-terminus of NS3. The remaining cleavages downstream from this site are catalysed by a serine protease also contained within the N-terminal region of NS3.

- The core protein has 191 amino acids and can be divided into three domains on the basis of hydrophobicity: domain 1 (residues 1–117) contains mainly basic residues with two short hydrophobic regions; domain 2 (residues 118–174) is less basic and more hydrophobic and its C-terminus is at the end of p21; domain 3 (residues 175–191) is highly hydrophobic and acts as a signal sequence for E1 envelope protein.
- Both envelope proteins (E1 and E2) are highly glycosylated and important in cell entry. E1 serves as the fusogenic subunit and E2 acts as the receptor binding protein. E1 has 4–5 N-linked glycans and E2 has 11 N-glycosylation sites.
- NS1 (p7) protein is dispensable for viral genome replication but plays a critical role in virus morphogenesis. This protein is a 63 amino acid membrane-spanning protein which locates itself in the endoplasmic reticulum. Cleavage of p7 is mediated by the endoplasmic reticulum's signal peptidases. Two transmembrane domains of p7 are connected by a cytoplasmic loop and are oriented towards the endoplasmic reticulum's lumen.
- NS2 protein is a 21–23 kilodalton (kDa) transmembrane protein with protease activity.
- NS3 is 67 kDa protein whose N-terminal has serine protease activity and whose C-terminal has NTPase/helicase activity. It is located within the endoplasmic reticulum and forms a heterodimeric complex with NS4A—a 54 amino acid membrane protein that acts as a cofactor of the proteinase.
- NS4A—a 54 amino acid membrane protein that acts as a cofactor of the proteinase.
- NS4B is a small (27 kDa) hydrophobic integral membrane protein with four transmembrane domains. It is located within the endoplasmic reticulum and plays an important role for recruitment of other viral proteins. It induces morphological changes to the endoplasmic reticulum forming a structure termed the membranous web.
- NS5A is a hydrophilic phosphoprotein which plays an important role in viral replication, modulation of cell signaling pathways and the interferon response. It is known to bind to endoplasmic reticulum-anchored human VAP proteins.
- The NS5B protein (65 kDa) is the viral RNA-dependent RNA polymerase. NS5B has the key function of replicating the HCV's viral RNA by using the viral positive sense RNA strand as its template and catalyzes the polymerization of ribonucleoside triphosphates (rNTP) during RNA replication. Several crystal structures of NS5B polymerase in several crystalline forms have been determined based on the same consensus sequence BK (HCV-BK, genotype 1). The structure can be represented by a right hand shape with fingers, palm, and thumb. The encircled active site, unique to NS5B, is contained within the palm structure of the protein. Recent studies on NS5B protein genotype 1b strain J4's (HC-J4) structure indicate a presence of an active site where possible control of nucleotide binding occurs and initiation of de-novo RNA synthesis. De-novo adds necessary primers for initiation of RNA replication. Current research attempts to bind structures to this active site to alter its functionality in order to prevent further viral RNA replication.

An 11th protein has also been described. This protein is encoded by a +1 frameshift in the capsid gene. It appears to be antigenic but its function is unknown.

== Replication ==
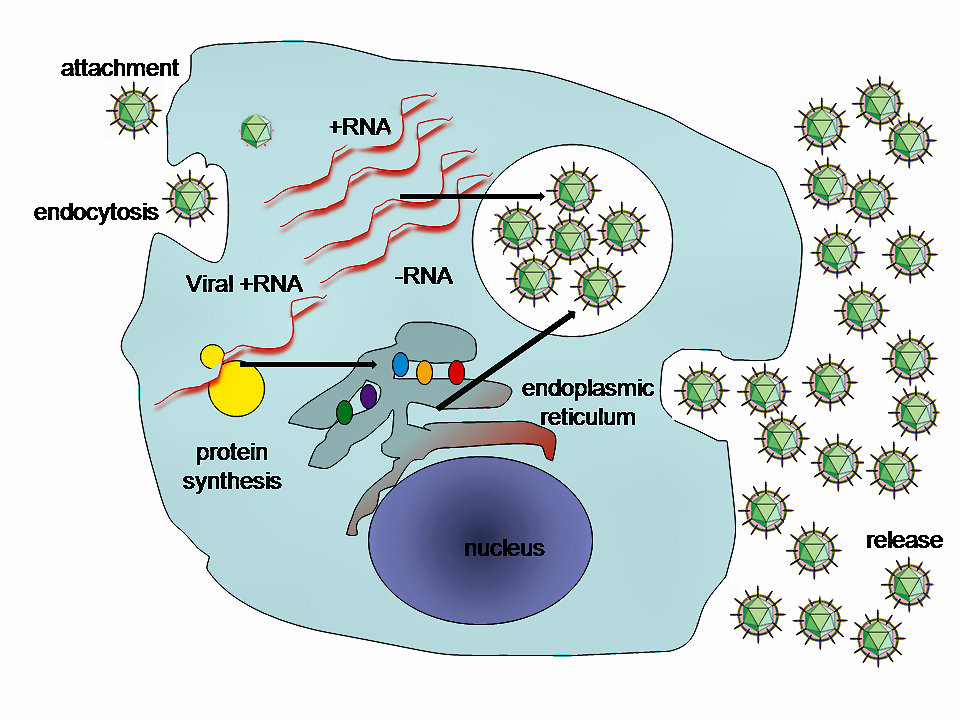
A simplified diagram of the hepatitis C virus replication cycle

Replication of HCV involves several steps. The virus replicates mainly in the hepatocytes of the liver, where it is estimated that daily each infected cell produces approximately fifty virions (virus particles) with a calculated total of one trillion virions generated. The virus may also replicate in peripheral blood mononuclear cells, potentially accounting for the high levels of immunological disorders found in chronically infected HCV patients. In the liver, the HCV particles are brought into the hepatic sinusoids by blood flow. These sinusoids neighbor hepatocyte cells. HCV is able to pass through the endothelium of the sinusoids and make its way to the basolateral surface of the hepatocyte cells.

HCV has a wide variety of genotypes and mutates rapidly due to a high error rate on the part of the virus' RNA-dependent RNA polymerase. The mutation rate produces so many variants of the virus it is considered a quasispecies rather than a conventional virus species. Entry into host cells occur through complex interactions between virions, especially through their glycoproteins, and cell-surface molecules CD81, LDL receptor, SR-BI, DC-SIGN, Claudin-1, and Occludin.

The envelope of HCV is similar to very low-density lipoproteins (VLDL) and low-density lipoproteins (LDL). Because of this similarity, the virus is thought to be able to associate with apolipoproteins. It could surround itself with lipoproteins, partially covering up E1 and E2. Recent research indicates that these apolipoproteins interact with scavenger receptor B1 (SR-B1). SR-B1 is able to remove lipids from the lipoproteins around the virus to better allow for HVR1 contact. Claudin 1, which is a tight-junction protein, and CD81 link to create a complex, priming them for later HCV infection processes. As the immune system is triggered, macrophages increase the amount of TNF-α around the hepatocytes which are being infected. This triggers the migration of occludin, which is another tight-junction complex, to the basolateral membrane. The HCV particle is ready to enter the cell.

These interactions lead to the endocytosis of the viral particle. This process is aided by clathrin proteins. Once inside an early endosome, the endosome and the viral envelope fuse and the RNA is allowed into the cytoplasm.

HCV takes over portions of the intracellular machinery to replicate. The HCV genome is translated to produce a single protein of around 3,011 amino acids. The polyprotein is then proteolytically processed by viral and cellular proteases to produce three structural (virion-associated) and seven nonstructural (NS) proteins. Alternatively, a frameshift may occur in the Core region to produce an alternate reading frame protein (ARFP). HCV encodes two proteases, the NS2 cysteine autoprotease and the NS3-4A serine protease. The NS proteins then recruit the viral genome into an RNA replication complex, which is associated with rearranged cytoplasmic membranes. RNA replication takes place via the viral RNA-dependent RNA polymerase NS5B, which produces a negative strand RNA intermediate. The negative strand RNA then serves as a template for the production of new positive strand viral genomes. Nascent genomes can then be translated, further replicated or packaged within new virus particles.

The virus replicates on intracellular lipid membranes. The endoplasmic reticulum in particular is deformed into uniquely shaped membrane structures termed 'membranous webs'. These structures can be induced by sole expression of the viral protein NS4B. The core protein associates with lipid droplets and utilises microtubules and dyneins to alter their location to a perinuclear distribution. Release from the hepatocyte may involve the VLDL secretory pathway. Another hypothesis states that the viral particle may be secreted from the endoplasmic reticulum through the endosomal sorting complex required for transport (ESCRT) pathway. This pathway is normally utilized to bud vesicles out of the cell. The only limitation to this hypothesis is that the pathway is normally used for cellular budding, and it is not known how HCV would commandeer the ESCRT pathway for use with the endoplasmic reticulum.

== Genotypes ==
Based on genetic differences between HCV isolates, the hepatitis C virus species is classified into six genotypes (1–6) with several subtypes within each genotype (represented by lowercase letters). Subtypes are further broken down into quasispecies based on their genetic diversity. Genotypes differ by 30–35% of the nucleotide sites over the complete genome. The difference in genomic composition of subtypes of a genotype is usually 20–25%. Subtypes 1a and 1b are found worldwide and cause 60% of all cases.

=== Recombination ===
When two viruses infect the same cell, genetic recombination may occur. Although infrequent, HCV recombination has been observed between different genotypes, between subtypes of the same genotype and even between strains of the same subtype.

== Epidemiology ==
Hepatitis C virus is predominantly a blood-borne virus, with very low risk of sexual or vertical transmission. Because of this mode of spread the key groups at risk are intravenous drug users (IDUs), recipients of blood products and sometimes patients on haemodialysis. Common setting for transmission of HCV is also intra-hospital (nosocomial) transmission, when practices of hygiene and sterilization are not correctly followed in the clinic. A number of cultural or ritual practices have been proposed as a potential historical mode of spread for HCV, including circumcision, genital mutilation, ritual scarification, traditional tattooing and acupuncture. It has also been argued that given the extremely prolonged periods of persistence of HCV in humans, even very low and undetectable rates of mechanical transmission via biting insects may be sufficient to maintain endemic infection in the tropics, where people receive a large number of insect bites.

== Evolution ==
Identification of the origin of this virus has been difficult but genotypes 1 and 4 appear to share a common origin. A Bayesian analysis suggests that the major genotypes diverged about 300–400 years ago from the common ancestor virus. The minor genotypes diverged about 200 years ago from their major genotypes. All of the extant genotypes appear to have evolved from genotype 1 subtype 1b.

A study of genotype 6 strains suggests an earlier date of evolution: approximately 1,100 to 1,350 years Before Present. The estimated rate of mutation was 1.8 × 10^{−4}. An experimental study estimated the mutation rate at 2.5–2.9 × 10^{−3} base substitutions per site per year. This genotype may be the ancestor of the other genotypes.

A study of European, US and Japanese isolates suggested that the date of origin of genotype 1b was approximately in the year 1925. The estimated dates of origin of types 2a and 3a were 1917 and 1943 respectively. The time of divergence of types 1a and 1b was estimated to be 200–300 years.

A study of genotype 1a and 1b estimated the dates of origin to be 1914–1930 for type 1a and 1911–1944 for type 1b. Both types 1a and 1b underwent massive expansions in their effective population size between 1940 and 1960. The expansion of HCV subtype 1b preceded that of subtype 1a by at least 16 years. Both types appear to have spread from the developed world to the developing world.

The genotype 2 strains from Africa can be divided into four clades that correlate with their country of origin: (1) Cameroon and Central African Republic (2) Benin, Ghana and Burkina Faso (3) Gambia, Guinea, Guinea-Bissau and Senegal (4) Madagascar. There is also strong evidence for the dissemination of HCV genotype 2 from West Africa to the Caribbean by the trans-Atlantic slave trade.

Genotype 3 is thought to have its origin in South East Asia.

These dates from these various countries suggests that this virus may have evolved in South East Asia and was spread to West Africa by traders from Western Europe. It was later introduced into Japan once that country's self-imposed isolation was lifted. Once introduced to a country its spread has been influenced by many local factors including blood transfusions, vaccination programmes, intravenous drug use and treatment regimes. Given the reduction in the rate of spread once screening for HCV in blood products was implemented in the 1990s, it would seem that previously blood transfusion was an important method of spread. Additional work is required to determine the dates of evolution of the various genotypes and the timing of their spread across the globe.

== Vaccination ==
Unlike hepatitis A and B, there is currently no vaccine to prevent hepatitis C infection.

== See also ==
- Blood-borne disease
- Cancer virus
- Discovery and development of NS5A inhibitors
- HCV IRES
- Hepatitis C virus stem-loop VII
- Hepatitis C virus 3′X element
- Hepatitis C virus (HCV) cis-acting replication element (CRE)
- Sexually transmitted infection
