= Langat virus =

Virus classification
- (unranked): Virus
- Realm: Riboviria
- Kingdom: Orthornavirae
- Phylum: Kitrinoviricota
- Class: Flasuviricetes
- Order: Amarillovirales
- Family: Flaviviridae
- Genus: Orthoflavivirus
- Subgenus: Euflavivirus
- Species: Orthoflavivirus langatense

Species of virus

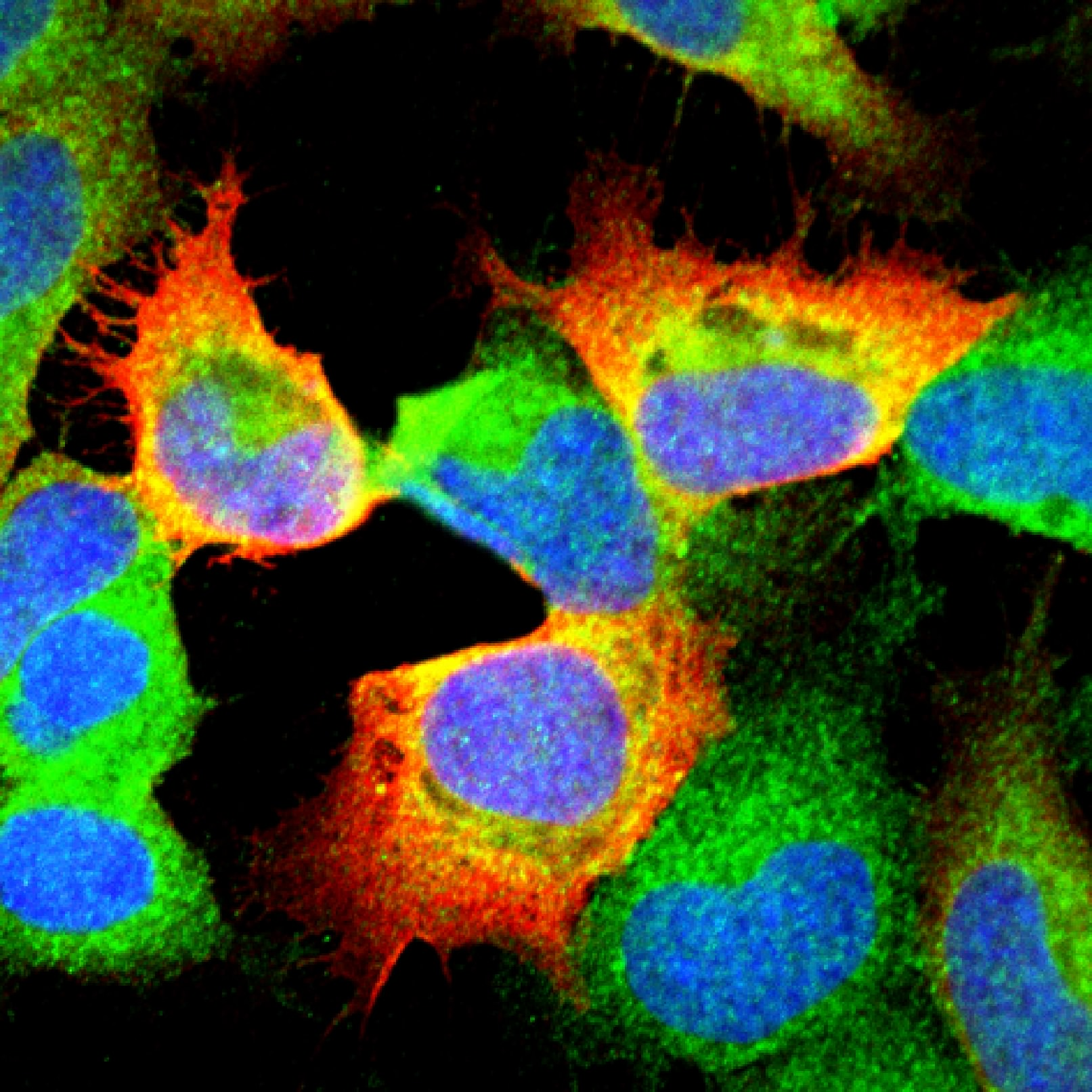
Cells infected by the Langat Virus under a microscope

Langat virus (LGTV) is a virus of the genus Orthoflavivirus. The virus was first isolated in Malaysia in 1956 from a hard tick of the Ixodes genus. This virus is antigenically related to Omsk hemorrhagic fever virus, Kyasanur forest disease virus, Alkhurma virus, Louping ill virus and other viruses of the tick-borne encephalitis virus (TBEV) complex. The Langat virus does not pose a significant epidemiological threat in comparison with TBEV. There are no known cases of human diseases associated with LGTV. The Malaysian strain (LGT strain TP21, also known as the Yelantsev virus) is naturally attenuated and induces neutralizing antibodies to tick-borne encephalitis virus (TBEV) and protection against other TBEV complex viruses in animals.

== LGTV-based vaccine ==
In the 1970s a live attenuate LGTV-based vaccine against tick-borne encephalitis was made. At the same time, another vaccine was tested, but the group vaccinated with the LGTV-based vaccine had the lowest level of developing infection decease. The vaccine was considered highly effective before it was found to cause encephalitis in 1 in 10,000 people. Since then, LGTV-based live vaccines have not been used.
