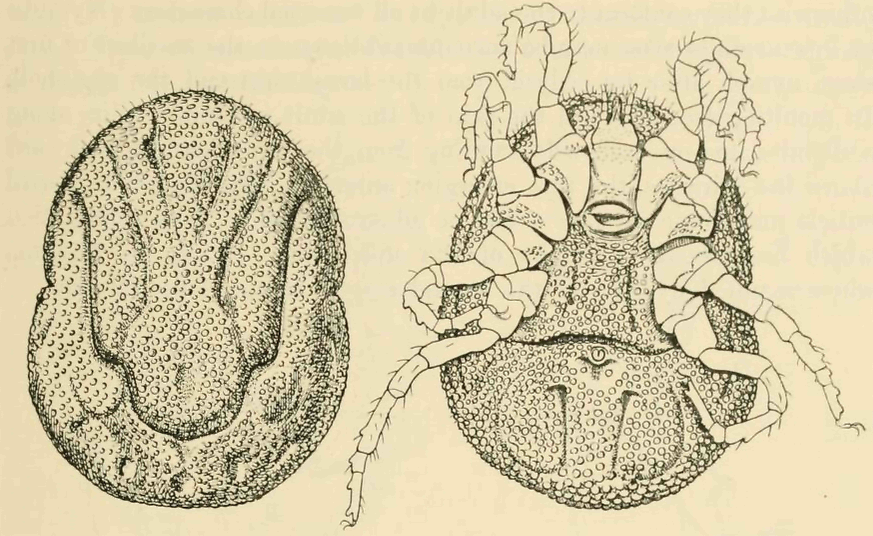
- Female

Scientific classification
- Domain: Eukaryota
- Kingdom: Animalia
- Phylum: Arthropoda
- Subphylum: Chelicerata
- Class: Arachnida
- Order: Ixodida
- Family: Argasidae
- Genus: Ornithodoros
- Species: O. moubata

Binomial name
- Ornithodoros moubata Murray, 1877

= Ornithodoros moubata =

Species of tick

Ornithodoros moubata, commonly known as the African hut tampan or the eyeless tampan, is a species of tick in the family Argasidae. It is an ectoparasite and vector of relapsing fever in humans, and African swine fever in pigs.

== Description ==
Soft ticks in the family Argasidae are characterised by the mouth being on the underside, and thus not visible from above, and by having no rigid scutum, the sclerotised plate on the anterior dorsal surface, just posterior to the head, possessed by hard ticks. This species has a leathery, wrinkled dorsal surface covered with small nodules. It has no eyes, and lacks a "suture line" at the junction of the dorsal and ventral surfaces. It has long mouthparts, armed with large, backward-pointing barbs for piercing a host's skin. The female grows to about 10 mm (0.4 in) long and the male to 8 mm (0.3 in).

== Distribution ==
This species occurs in Kenya, Malawi, Mozambique, Namibia, South Africa, Tanzania, Uganda, Zambia, and Zimbabwe, but mainly in wildlife reserves. They also occur in southern Sudan, Somalia and southern Ethiopia, as well as the Democratic Republic of Congo, the Central African Republic and Chad, and infrequently in West Africa.

== Habitat ==
O. moubata typically resides in animal burrows. It is also encountered in pigsties, soil, and crevices of human habitations.

== Lifecycle ==
The lifecycle of O. moubata involves several nymphal stages and one adult stage. Each of these stages requires a blood meal, suitable hosts being humans, poultry, and members of the pig family, Suidae. When the nymph or adult has engorged itself, it drops off its host and enters a quiescent state while the blood is digested. When ready to feed again, it finds another host for this purpose. Adult females lay a batch of eggs, which hatch into larvae that develop into the first nymphal stage.

== Role in disease ==
=== Tick-borne relapsing fever ===
Relapsing fever in humans is a vector-borne infectious disease caused by certain bacteria of the genus Borrelia. Tick-borne relapsing fever is transmitted through the bites of lice or soft-bodied ticks (genus Ornithodoros). Each species of Borrelia is typically associated with a single tick species, with Borrelia duttoni being transmitted by O. moubata, and being responsible for the relapsing fever found in central, eastern, and southern Africa. Unlike in most other species of Borrelia, which have rodents as reservoir hosts, B. duttoni has humans as reservoir hosts. O. moubata exhibits vertical transmission of the pathogen across generations and thereby appears to represent its major reservoir. It excretes the pathogen in saliva and coxal fluid.

=== African swine fever ===
African swine fever is a vector-borne disease of domestic pigs, warthogs, and bushpigs, caused by infection with the African swine fever virus and carried by O. moubata. In wild members of the family Suidae, the disease seems symptomless, but in domestic pigs, it causes a haemorrhagic fever with high mortality rates. Transmission can be by tick bite or by eating infected tissues.

=== Other infections ===
Other infections that can survive inside this tick include West Nile virus, HIV, hepatitis B, Royal Farm virus, Langat virus, Rickettsia, Babesia equi, and Acanthocheilonema viteae, but only some of these can be transmitted by the ticks to humans. Although HIV-1BRU can remain viable in the tick's digestive tract for up to ten days, this is a shorter interval than the tick normally takes between blood meals, and laboratory tests indicate that mechanical transmission of HIV is unlikely.

== See also ==
- Ticks of domestic animals
