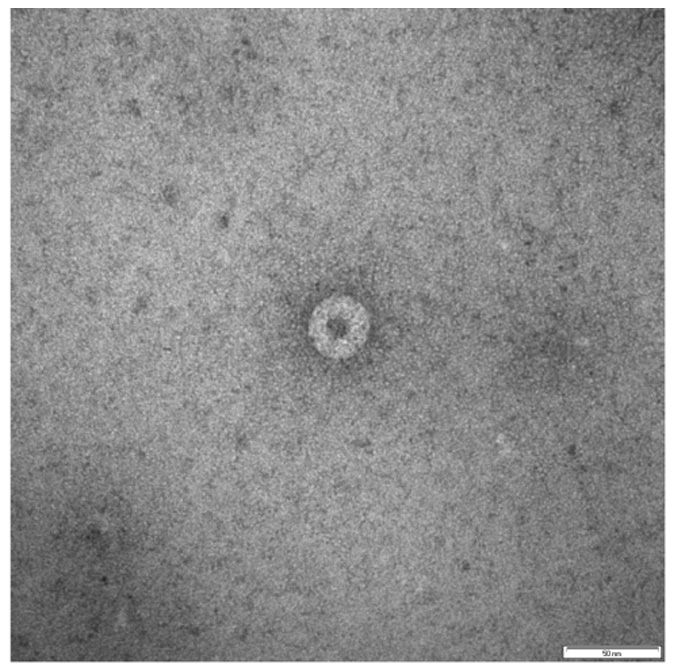
- Transmission electron micrograph of a PCV particle

Virus classification
- (unranked): Virus
- Realm: Riboviria
- Kingdom: Orthornavirae
- Phylum: Kitrinoviricota
- Class: Flasuviricetes
- Order: Amarillovirales
- Family: Flaviviridae
- Genus: Orthoflavivirus
- Virus: Palm Creek virus

= Palm Creek virus =

Species of virus

Palm Creek virus (PCV) is an insect virus belonging to the genus Orthoflavivirus, of the family Flaviviridae. It was discovered in 2013 from the mosquito Coquillettidia xanthogaster. The female mosquitoes were originally collected in 2010 from Darwin, Katherine, Alice Springs, Alyangula, Groote Eylandt, Jabiru and the McArthur River Mine, and had since been preserved. The discovery was made by biologists at the University of Queensland. The virus is named after Palm Creek, near Darwin, from where it was originally isolated.

PCV is the first insect-specific virus discovered in Australia. Genetically it most closely related to Nakiwogo virus, isolated from Mansonia mosquito in Uganda, and clustered more broadly with Culex-associated viruses, such as Culex flavivirus (CxFV).In one experiment in 2016, when cultivated mosquito [Aedes albopictus (C6/36)] cells were preinfected with PCV, human-pathogenic viruses such as West Nile and Murray Valley encephalitis viruses were found to be unable to develop in the infected cells.

The follow-up experiment confirmed the fact that pre-infection of mosquitoes prevents transmission of harmful arbovirus. Further, it shown that PCV could not infect Culex annulirostris, the primary vector of encephalitic flaviviruses in Australia, through blood meal indicating that the virus is not a threat to human, or other vertebrate, health. However, the virus could be inoculated (at the thorax region) with successful infection in the C. annulirostris, Aedes aegypti and A. vigilax. This further supports the fact that preinfection of these disease-vector mosquitoes with PCV can be prevented from transmitting harmful viral diseases in humans, since a mosquito generally do not carry mixed infection.

The PCV genome encodes a polyprotein that consists of 3,364 amino acids. Genetic analysis shows that it is most closely related African virus Nakiwogo virus (NAKV), sharing 63.7% nucleotide similarity. A report indicates that the virus is also closely related to Assam virus, discovered in Assam, India, in 2015.

The complete structure of the 3'UTR RNA of PCV has been solved, revealing that that PCV has evolved to produce multiple sfRNAs from its 3'UTR. Duplicated xrRNAs in PCV appear to be evolutionarily selected for to provide functional redundancy allowing the production of sfRNAs if one structures is disabled by mutations.
