= Parramatta River virus =

Virus classification
- (unranked): Virus
- Realm: Riboviria
- Kingdom: Orthornavirae
- Phylum: Kitrinoviricota
- Class: Flasuviricetes
- Order: Amarillovirales
- Family: Flaviviridae
- Genus: Orthoflavivirus (?)
- Virus: Parramatta River virus

Insect virus discovered in Australia

Parramatta River virus (PaRV) is an insect virus belonging to Flaviviridae and endemic to Australia. It was discovered in 2015. The virus was identified from the mosquito Aedes vigilax collected from Sydney under the joint research project by scientists at the University of Queensland and the University of Sydney. In experimental infections, the virus is unable to grow in vertebrate cells, but only in Aedes-derived mosquito cell lines. This suggests that the virus does not infect vertebrates. The name is given because it was discovered from Silverwater, a suburb of Sydney on the southern bank of the Parramatta River. The mosquitoes from which the virus was isolated were actually collected in 2007, and had been preserved since then. The study commenced only after the development of the technique of viral detection in mosquitoes in the University of Queensland.

The virus was identified as a result of investigation on the outbreak of Ross River virus in 2015. Both the viruses are transmitted by the same mosquitoes, but PaRV is not transmitted to humans, unlike RRV. According to one of the co-authors, Cameron Webb of the University of Sydney, this unique transmission of PaRV could hold a key "to vaccinate mosquitoes and stop their bites making thousands of Australians sick every summer." The reason, explained by Jody Hobson-Peters of the University of Queensland, is that if mosquitoes (vectors for human diseases) are infected with the PaRV, then they will no longer be able to carry other human-infectious viruses.

The virus was identified from the whole genome sequence using Sanger sequencing. The viral genome consists of 10,893 nucleotides and encodes a polyprotein of 3384 amino acids. Comparison with the genomes of other viruses showed that its closest relatives are the Mediterranean Ochlerotatus flavivirus (MoFV) isolated from Ochlerotatus mosquitoes in Spain, and the Hanko virus (HANKV) from Ochlerotatus mosquitoes in Finland (both identified in 2012). With MoFV its shares 72.7% nucleotide identity, and with HANKV the nucleotide similarity is 71.4%.

The complete structure of the 3'UTR RNA of PaRV has been solved, revealing that that PaRV has evolved to produce multiple separate sfRNAs from its 3'UTR. Duplicated xrRNAs in PaRV and other insect-specific Flaviviruses appear to be evolutionarily selected for to provide functional redundancy allowing the production of sfRNAs if one structures is disabled by mutations.
