= Wesselsbron virus =

Virus classification
- (unranked): Virus
- Realm: Riboviria
- Kingdom: Orthornavirae
- Phylum: Kitrinoviricota
- Class: Flasuviricetes
- Order: Amarillovirales
- Family: Flaviviridae
- Genus: Orthoflavivirus
- Subgenus: Euflavivirus
- Species: Orthoflavivirus wesselsbronense

Species of virus

Wesselsbron (WSL) virus is an arthropod-borne virus in the genus Orthoflavivirus of the family Flaviviridae that causes Wesselsbron disease in cattle, sheep, goats, camels, pigs, donkeys, horses, ostriches, and wild ruminants with occasional incidental spillover to humans. It is transmitted by mosquitoes in the genus Aedes including A. caballus and A. circumluteolus.

== History ==
The first known outbreak was reported in 1955 on a sheep farm in the town of Wesselsbrons in Orange Free State Province, South Africa after an increase of lamb deaths and ewe abortions.

Wesselsbron is located in Free State (South African province)

Since the flock had been vaccinated 2 weeks before for protection against the Rift Valley virus, the possibility of a "new" disease was not put into consideration; the vaccine was assumed to be the culprit. Although they both share similarities, the WSL virus was isolated as distinct from the Rift Valley virus after the examination of a dead lamb's liver and brain.

== Geographical Distribution ==
Since 1955, WSL virus has been found in animals and mosquitos from Zimbabwe, Uganda, Kenya, Nigeria, Central African Republic, Senegal, Cameroon, and Ivory Coast. Serologic evidence has also shown the virus to be present in Mozambique, Botswana, Namibia, Angola, and Madagascar. Outside of Africa, WSL virus has been found in Thailand.

== Effect on Sheep ==
Although it can infect a wide variety of animals, WSL virus is most commonly found in sheep. In newborn lambs, death may occur within 72 hours following an incubation period of 1–3 days. Signs of illness, which include but are not limited to fever, anorexia, listlessness, weakness, and increased respiration, can often go undetected because they are not specific to any disease. Pregnant ewes generally suffer from abortions, but rams and non-pregnant ewes usually only develop a fever. There is no specific treatment for the virus, but sheep can be immunized with an attenuated vaccine that lasts a lifetime.

== Human Cases ==
Most documented human infections have been acquired by field workers bitten by mosquitoes or in the laboratory. Person-to-Person transmission of the virus has yet to be reported, so it is not considered to be contagious in humans. The WSL virus has an incubation period of 2–4 days before leading to a sudden onset of a generally mild, acute phase that includes fever, rigors, headache, myalgia, arthralgia, and impaired vision.
