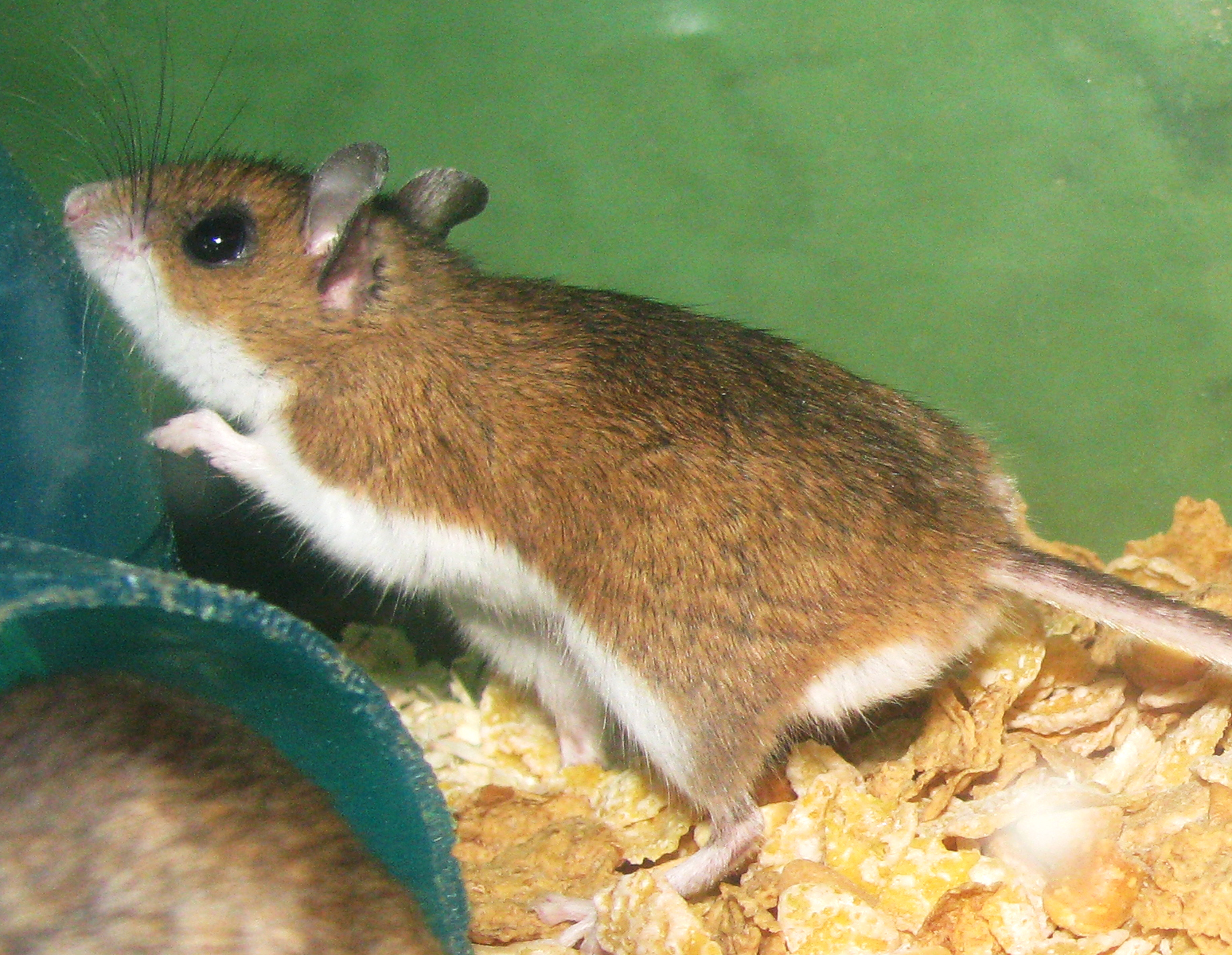
- Deer mouse, known host of Modoc virus

Virus classification
- (unranked): Virus
- Realm: Riboviria
- Kingdom: Orthornavirae
- Phylum: Kitrinoviricota
- Class: Flasuviricetes
- Order: Amarillovirales
- Family: Flaviviridae
- Genus: Orthoflavivirus
- Subgenus: Euflavivirus
- Species: Orthoflavivirus modocense

= Modoc virus =

Species of virus

Modoc virus (MODV) is a rodent-associated orthoflavivirus. Small and enveloped, MODV contains positive single-stranded RNA. Taxonomically, MODV is part of the Orthoflavivirus genus and Flaviviridae family. The Flavivirus genus includes nearly 80 viruses, both vector-borne and no known vector (NKV) species. Known flavivirus vector-borne viruses include Dengue virus, Yellow Fever virus, tick-borne encephalitis virus, and West Nile virus.

In 1958, MODV was first isolated from the mammary gland tissue of a white-footed deer mouse (Peromyscus maniculatus) captured in Modoc County, California. Since the first isolation, the MODV has also been isolated from deer mice in Oregon, Colorado, and Montana. There are other anti-genetically and genetically related viruses which also have no known vector such as Jutiapa virus, the Cowbone Ridge virus, the Sal Vieja virus, and the San Perlita virus. Little information is known about these viruses as well.

== Structure ==
The MODV virus has a particle size of about 45 nm which is comparable with other flaviviruses particles that are about 40-60 nm in diameter. A mature flavivirus has a spherical shape and contains multiple copies of three structural proteins (C, M, and E), a host-derived membrane bilayer, and a single copy of a positive-sense RNA genome of approximately 11,000 nucleotides. The first structure of a flavivirus, the Dengue virus, was determined by using cryo-electron microscopy and an electron density map fitted with the known structure of glycoprotein E (Fig.1).

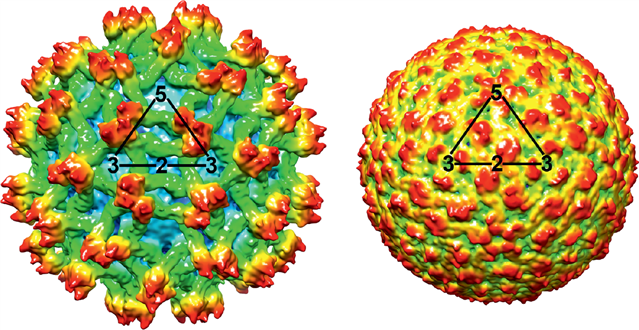
Figure 1. Dengue virus three-dimensional cryo-electron microscopic reconstruction

== Genome ==
Flaviviruses have positive (+) ssRNA genomes about 11kb in size. The MODV genome is 10,600 nucleotides in length with a single open reading frame extending from nucleotides 110 to 10,234, encoding 3374 amino acids. The ORF has the gene order C-prM-E-NS1-NS2A-NS2B-NS3-NS4A-NS4B-NS5 which is consistent with mosquito- and tick-borne flaviviruses (Fig.2).

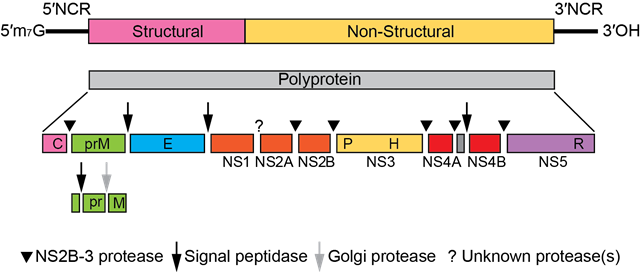
Figure 2. Flavivirus genome organization

== Replication cycle ==
Similar to most positive (+) ssRNA viruses, flaviviruses generate organelle-like structures in the endoplasmic reticulum (ER) of the host organism for replication. Since the ER is involved in de novo biogenesis of some cell organelles, viruses take advantage of the replication location to take over some of the organelle functions for its own replication cycle. Viral genome replication in the ER occurs in structures called virus replication organelles. The organelles include two distinct subdomains, vesicle packets (VP) and convoluted membranes (CMs). The site of viral genome replication is found within the vesicle packets which are clusters of small vesicle compartments. The function of CMs is relatively unknown, but they are described as electron-dense amorphous structures near the VPs. The large single polypeptide encoded by the genome is processed in the ER membrane by host or viral proteases. The large polypeptide is divided into three structural proteins (capsid, prM, and E) and a group of non-structural proteins (NS1-NS5). The viral genomic RNA forms a nucleocapsid complex with the capsid protein which aids in genome packaging into mature virus particles. The prM and E proteins are considered significant components of the virus particle and can even form spherical virus particles. The exact functions of NS proteins are relatively unknown, however, they are assumed to play a role in the formation of virus particle replication organelles. The NS1 protein has a large ectodomain which is believed to function in the deformation of the ER membrane from the luminal side. NS2B protein, a transmembrane protein, directly interacts with NS3 which is a soluble protein anchored to the membrane. With its protease activity and RNA helicase activity, the NS3 protein is involved in viral polyprotein processing and viral RNA replication. NS5 plays a role in the replication of the viral genomic RNA and the formation of the 5’-cap structure for protein translation with its RNA dependent and RNA polymerase (RdRp) activity and methyltransferase activity. The 5′-end possesses a type I cap (m7GpppAmp) that is not seen in viruses of the other genera. Proteins N2SA, NS4A, and NS4B are membrane-integrated proteins but have no clear function.

== Life cycle ==
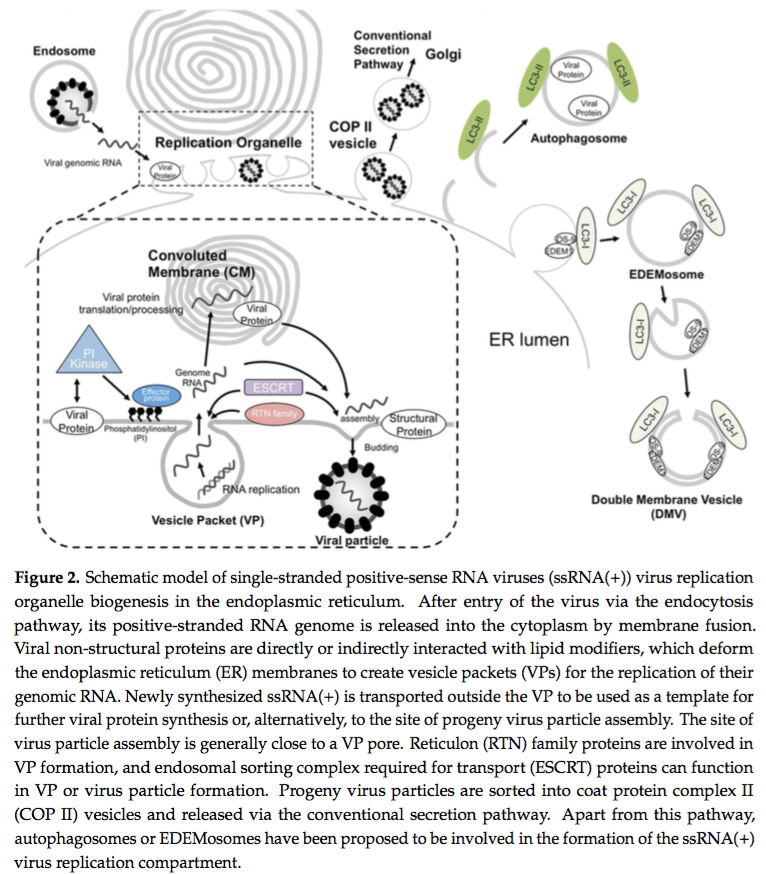
Schematic model of single-stranded positive-sense RNA viruses

=== Entry into cell ===
To enter the cell, MODV virus is assumed to invade the cell via steps similar to the Flavivirus family. Through endocytosis, the virus enters the host cell and then releases its positive (+) ssRNA genome into the cytoplasm through membrane fusion.

=== Replication ===
The MDOV genome codes for a single ORF, which is processed by both cellular and viral proteases to form three structural proteins and at least seven non-structural proteins.

On either side of the ORF, untranslated regions (UTRs) are present and fold into complex stem-loop structures required for replication. The 5’ UTR consists of 109 nucleotides and the 3’ UTR consists of 366 nucleotides. Comparing MODV to 20 other flaviviruses, several regions with high sequence similarity appeared. The regions corresponded to functionally important domains and conserved sites for proteolytic cleavage by viral and cellular proteases.

=== Assembly and release ===
The rough endoplasmic reticulum is believed to be the site of viral assembly. Following genome replication, the newly synthesized RNA interacts with the capsid and buds into the ER lumen along with immature prM and E proteins which undergo maturation in the Golgi and endosomes. For instance, the prM protein is cleaved by furin or a furin-like cellular protease to generate mature virions. The virion moves through the cytoplasm until it is released from the cell via exocytosis.

== Transmission and tropism ==
Since no vector has been identified for MODV, the exact mode transmission is not known. However, the studied field strain of MODV showed persistent infection of the virus in deer mouse lungs that may be transmitted horizontally through close, prolonged contact of infected and susceptible individuals. Direct contact (i.e., salivary secretions) or indirect contact (i.e., fomites, aerosols and urine) may enable viral spread. Rodent nests during the winter provide conditions suitable for the horizontal transmission of viruses. In addition, transmission presumably occurs horizontally since attempts to infect ticks and mosquitoes as cultured cell lines or in vivo have been unsuccessful. Other studies suggest cannibalism does not play a direct role in viral transmission, but the possibility of sexual transmission has yet to be explored.

The molecular determinants of transmission are unknown, but comparison of the conserved sequence differences between the two groups suggests vector-borne conserved pentanucleotide sequence (CPS) nor variable region (VR) of the conserved sequences are required for vector-borne transmission.

A transient viremia in deer mice (Peromyscus maniculatus) produced a measurable production of antibody titers and showed persistence in the lungs. While deer mice are accepted as the main host organism, the presence of antibodies in chipmunks (Tamias minimus) and red squirrels (Tamias-ciurus hudsonicus) suggests the virus has multiple hosts. Virus transmission in chipmunks and red squirrels was more successful than in deer mice, which may be due to a difference in viral shedding under experimental conditions and field conditions. Field conditions may cause more stress due to cold temperatures and food shortages.

== Associated diseases ==
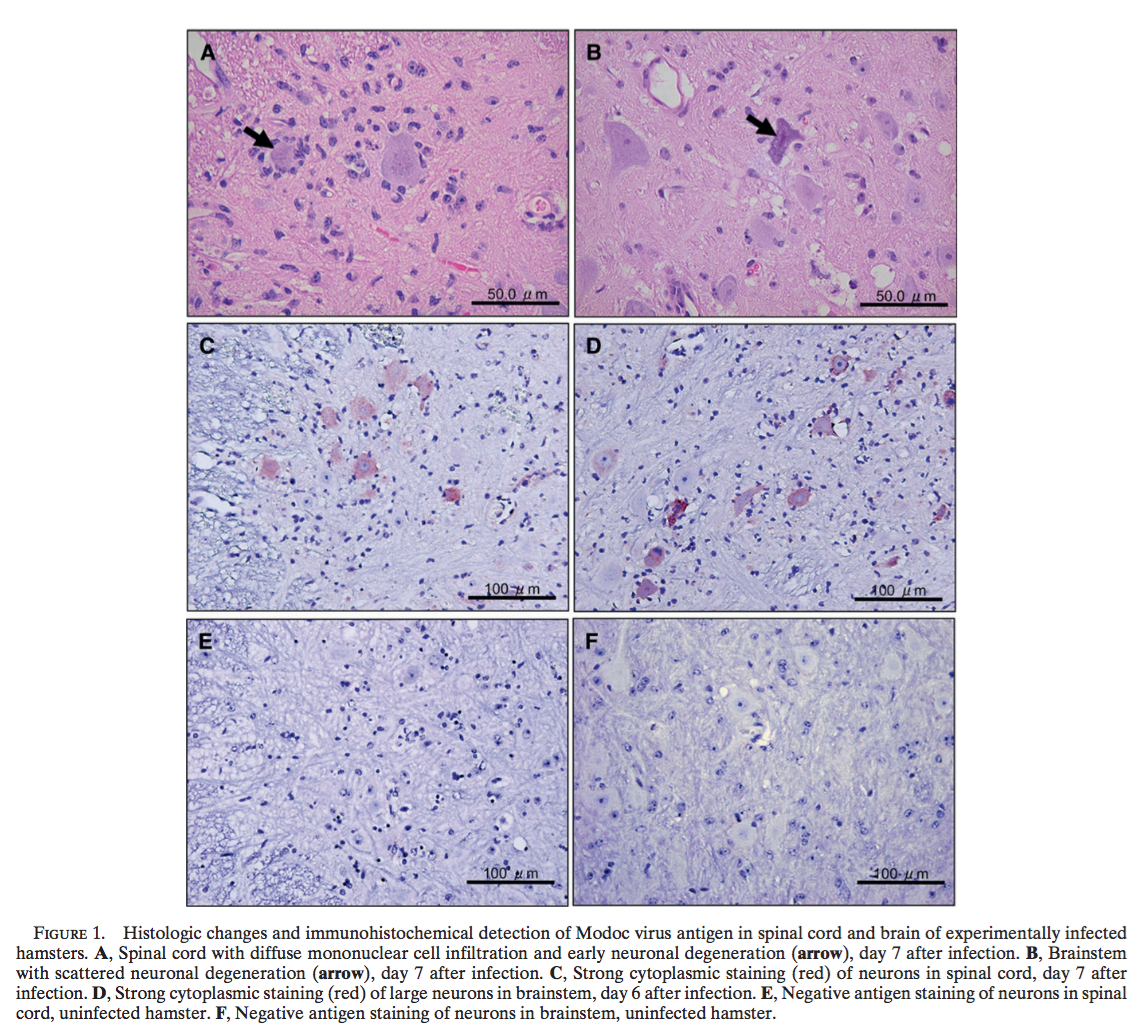
Modoc virus antigen in spinal cord and brain

A rodent-associated virus, MODV has the potential to cause disease in humans similar to other flaviviruses. It was determined that MODV was the responsible virus for a case of aseptic meningitis when the virus was first discovered in California.

Typically, flaviviruses cause encephalitis in host organisms. MODV causes flavivirus-like encephalitis in SCID (severe combined immunodeficiency) mice and in hamsters with histopathological features reminiscent of flavivirus encephalitis in man. Studies suggest envelope (E) proteins encoded for by the genome may play a dominant role as a determinant of flavivirus neurovirulence. A single amino acid substitution was shown to cause major effects on neurovirulence. The mechanisms and determinants involved in Flavivirus neuroinvasiveness remains unknown. However, evidence suggests neuroinvasiveness depends entirely on envelope proteins E and prM (pre-membrane)

In a study investigating the effects of MODV on hamsters, severe encephalitis, bilateral hindlimb paralysis, and complete paralysis with an intact corneal reflex were observed. MODV-induced encephalitis in hamsters was characterized by movement of monocytes and lymphocytes into the cortex and bulbus olfactorius, causing massive destruction of the tissue structure. In all surviving hamsters, IgM and HI antibodies to MODV were present in the blood after subcutaneous infection. Of all infected hamsters, no substantial microscopic lesions were observed in the liver, spleen, lung, and heart. However, rare focal portal inflammation of the liver and mild reactive lymphoid hyperplasia of the spleen were noted. Considerable pathological changes were observed in the brain and spinal cord during early infection. During early infection, the lesions in the spinal cord were more severe than those observed in the brain. In immunocompetent mice, MODV causes 100% morbidity and mortality when the virus was inoculated directly into the brain. Alternatively, when inoculated via the intranasal route, 50% morbidity and mortality was observed

Infectious MODV was also isolated from kidney tissue for at least eight months after infection, specifically the epithelium of the renal tubules. Despite the presence of antibodies, infected hamsters continued to shed viruses in the urine for up to four months. Due to viral shedding in the urine, there is the potential use of urinalysis to monitor the effectiveness of therapy on viral replication by monitoring the viral RNA in the urine using quantitative RT-PCR assays
