= Kedougou virus =

Virus classification
- (unranked): Virus
- Realm: Riboviria
- Kingdom: Orthornavirae
- Phylum: Kitrinoviricota
- Class: Flasuviricetes
- Order: Amarillovirales
- Family: Flaviviridae
- Genus: Orthoflavivirus
- Subgenus: Euflavivirus
- Species: Orthoflavivirus kedougouense

Species of virus

Kedougou virus (KEDV) is an arbovirus of the Flaviviridae family, genus Orthoflavivirus, belongs to the IV group of a ((+) ssRNA) viruses. The virus was first isolated from Aedes minutus mosquitoes in Senegal in 1971. KEDV belongs to the Kedougou virus group. It is endemically present in the Kédougou Region, from which it takes its name, together with other arboviruses of the genus Flavivirus such as: Yellow fever virus (YFV), West Nile virus (WNV) and Zika virus (ZIKV). KEDV has also been isolated from Aedes circumluteolus mosquitoes collected in Ndumu, KwaZulu-Natal, South Africa.

While there is serological evidence for previous infection in humans, and one isolate from humans identified in the Central African Republic, to date no disease has been reported.
