= Sepik virus =

Virus classification
- (unranked): Virus
- Realm: Riboviria
- Kingdom: Orthornavirae
- Phylum: Kitrinoviricota
- Class: Flasuviricetes
- Order: Amarillovirales
- Family: Flaviviridae
- Genus: Orthoflavivirus
- Subgenus: Euflavivirus
- Species: Orthoflavivirus sepikense

Mosquito transmitted virus endemic to Papua New Guinea

Sepik virus (SEPV) is an arthropod-borne virus (arbovirus) of the genus Orthoflavivirus and family Flaviviridae. Flaviviridae is one of the most well characterized viral families, as it contains many well-known viruses that cause diseases that have become very prevalent in the world, like Dengue virus. The genus Orthoflavivirus is one of the largest viral genera and encompasses over 50 viral species, including tick and mosquito borne viruses like Yellow fever virus and West Nile virus. Sepik virus is much less well known and has not been as well-classified as other viruses because it has not been known of for very long. Sepik virus was first isolated in 1966 from the mosquito Mansonia septempunctata, and it derives its name from the Sepik River area in Papua New Guinea, where it was first found. The geographic range of Sepik virus is limited to Papua New Guinea, due to its isolation.

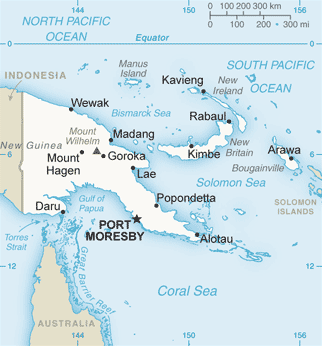
Map of Papua New Guinea, the only place Sepik virus has been found

Arboviruses are a continuing threat to public health in Papua New Guinea especially because of lack of surveillance and reporting, so much of the prevalence of disease due to these viruses are unknown in that area. Arboviruses cause outbreaks when the virus that infects an endemic population spreads through a vector like mosquitoes or ticks to humans. While the principal host species for Sepik virus is still unknown, it has been discovered that the primary mosquito species that transmits Sepik virus is Ficalbia spp. This differs from other related viruses, as most of the well-classified mosquito borne viruses public health officials focus on are transmitted by Culex and Aedes aegypti mosquito species.

== Viral classification and evolution ==
Sepik virus is in the genus Orthoflavivirus, which means it is similar to yellow fever virus, as Yellow Fever Virus is the type virus for the family. It is also an arbovirus, so the virus is transmitted by an arthropod vector. The genus Orthoflavivirus can further be broken down into clades based on whether the vector that transmits the virus to humans, and what the vector is. If the vector is known, it forms a clade, which is further broken down into type of vector. In the known vector clade, there is a mosquito group and a tick group, which diverged early in the phylogeny and do not have much overlap, ecologically. The mosquito group is further divided into the types of diseases the virus causes, like neurotropic viruses and hemorrhagic disease viruses. Neurotropic viruses like Japanese encephalitis virus cause encephalitic disease and is commonly spread by Culex mosquito species and has a reservoir in birds, while hemorrhagic disease viruses like Yellow Fever are commonly spread by Aedes mosquito species and have primate hosts. Sepik virus is classified as a hemorrhagic disease virus because it is in the Yellow fever group, as it is most closely related to Yellow Fever virus. However, Sepik virus does not have the same pathogenicity or virulence as Yellow Fever virus, as it is not known to cause hemorrhagic fever, but rather a febrile illness.

== Viral structure ==
Similar to other viruses in the genus Orthoflavivirus, Sepik virus is a circular, enveloped virus that displays icosahedral symmetry in the nucleocapsid. The virion is relatively small, only about 50 nm in diameter. The virus particle contains three major structural proteins; there are two membrane-associated proteins, the envelope protein (E) and membrane protein (M). The virus also has a capsid protein (C) that protects the genome from the environment, which could cause the genome to dry out or become degraded. The capsid is mainly protein, but 17% of the capsid are lipids by weight, which were derived from the host cell membrane; the capsid is also about 9% carbohydrate by weight in the form of glycolipids and glycoproteins.

== Viral genome ==
The genome for Sepik virus is a non-segmented, single stranded, positive sense RNA molecule that is about 10.79 kilobases in length. The genome consists of a short non-coding region at the 5’ end, a single long open reading frame (ORF) that contains the genes for all the genes the virus produces, and a non-coding region at the 3’ end and the genome does not have a poly-A tail typically seen at the end of mRNA molecules. The non-coding regions are useful in determining phylogenetic relationships between viruses within the Orthoflavivirus genus, as well as within groups, like the Yellow Fever virus group. The non-coding regions also contain motifs that are important in viral translation, replication and packaging. The genome serves as both genomic data and mRNA, encoding 3 structural proteins necessary for the virion and 8 non-structural proteins necessary for replication. The genome also contains a type I cap and a conserved stem loop at the 5’ end, labeled as m7GpppAmp, that is not seen in viruses in other families or genera. The cap serves as an initiation site for transcription, as well as stability to the mRNA.

== Replication cycle ==
=== Entry ===
Entry of Sepik virus into the cell is mediated by the envelope protein (E), which is the viral entry protein. The envelope protein binds to the host cell receptor which then signals to the cell to bring the virus inside using endocytosis. The envelope protein then helps the viral envelope fuse to the host cell membrane in order to release the viral capsid into the cell.

=== Replication and transcription ===
Once the genome is in the cell, replication occurs along the membrane of the rough endoplasmic reticulum. Replication usually occurs in membrane invaginations to shield the replicating genome from host defenses like RNA interference, because single stranded positive RNA viruses replicate through a double stranded RNA intermediate. The genome also functions as mRNA and the virus uses the host cell’s machinery to translate one long polyprotein containing both the structural and non-structural proteins. This one long polyprotein is later cleaved into the capsid, envelope and membrane protein, and also proteins that are not assembled into the virion, which are denoted as non-structural proteins. The non-structural proteins function in viral replication and assembly. These proteins are named NS1, NS2A, NS2B, NS3, NS4A, NS4B, NS5, and NS2K, where NS denotes “non-structural”. NS3 has enzymatic activity as a helicase and protease, while NS5 is an RNA dependent RNA polymerase, allowing the virus to replicate a new (+)RNA genome by creating a complementary (-)RNA strand and using that as a template for the genome. The other non-structural proteins function in RNA replication, viral assembly and release, processing the viral polyprotein and inhibiting the host’s innate immunity, like inhibiting interferon signaling.

=== Assembly and release ===
There is no known structured nucleocapsid for any viruses in the genus Orthoflavivirus, as no viruses belonging to the genus have been seen using cryo-electron microscopy. Therefore, assembly of the virion likely consists of the capsid protein (C) and the genomic RNA becoming aggregated and condensed, with the capsid protein acting as a charge neutralizer for the RNA, to eventually form a small particle that does not have any contact with the envelope. Virions are released by budding of the capsid protein and the RNA into the endoplasmic reticulum membrane to form a lipid envelope that are sporadically ingrained with glycoproteins, like the envelope (E) glycoprotein that is used for entry into the next host cell. The virions are later secreted out of the host cell to infect new, susceptible cells.

== Transmission ==
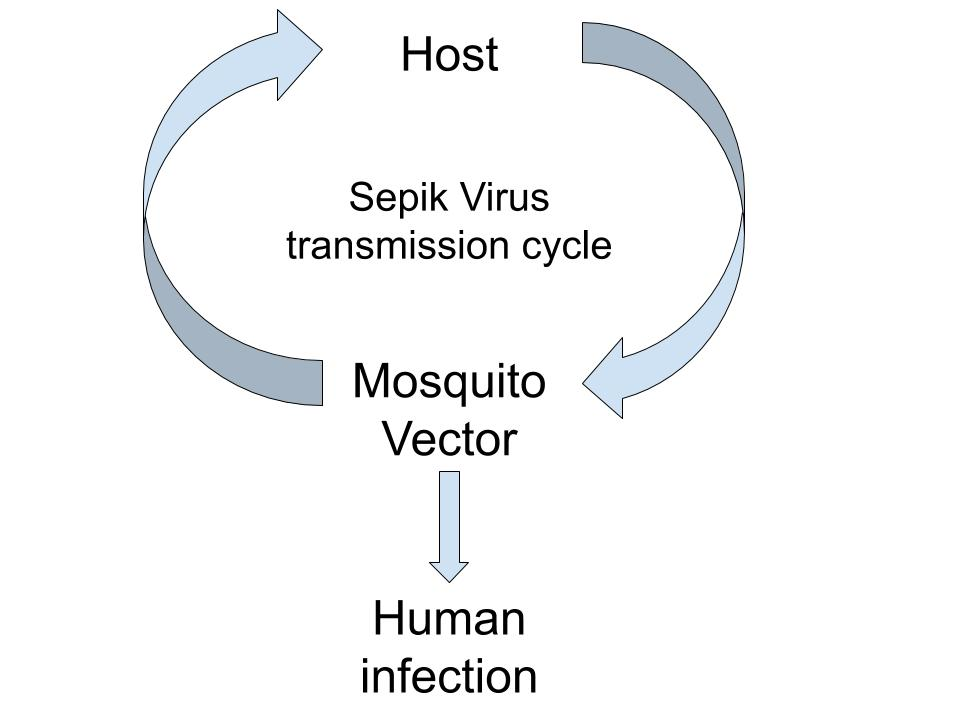
This diagram shows how Sepik virus gets from the natural host of the virus to humans to make them sick.

Sepik virus, like all other arboviruses, is transmitted from a host reservoir to humans through a viral vector. Some arboviruses can be maintained in a population with minimal input from the reservoir, meaning the vector can use infected humans as a source of the virus to spread to new, susceptible people. However, Sepik virus cannot be maintained in the population and therefore cannot be passed via mosquito vector between humans. This means that the host reservoir is the only known source of Sepik virus, but the host reservoir is unknown at this time.

== Associated diseases ==
Sepik virus causes a fever in humans, much like other viruses in the genus Orthoflavivirus like Dengue virus and Yellow fever virus. However, Sepik virus is only known to cause a non-severe febrile fever and not hemorrhagic fever like the more well classified viruses. Fever as a result of Sepik virus infection has only been seen in Papua New Guinea and has remained isolated from the rest of the world. However, reporting and surveillance for this fever is lacking, so spread of the vector and Sepik virus fever may have begun to spread outside its normal range, and no notice has been taken.

Arboviruses, mainly highly pathogenic ones like Yellow Fever virus or Dengue virus, are important emerging pathogens in many tropical and developing countries because of the high prevalence of the viral vector and many countries have poor sanitation and do not have vector control methods. The known geographic regions many arboviruses are currently found are not concrete, as changing global temperatures contribute to the widening of vector habitat, as many arboviruses that have been limited to tropical zones are now seen further into the temperate zones as the vector, mainly mosquitoes, moves into new areas and can infect naïve populations.
