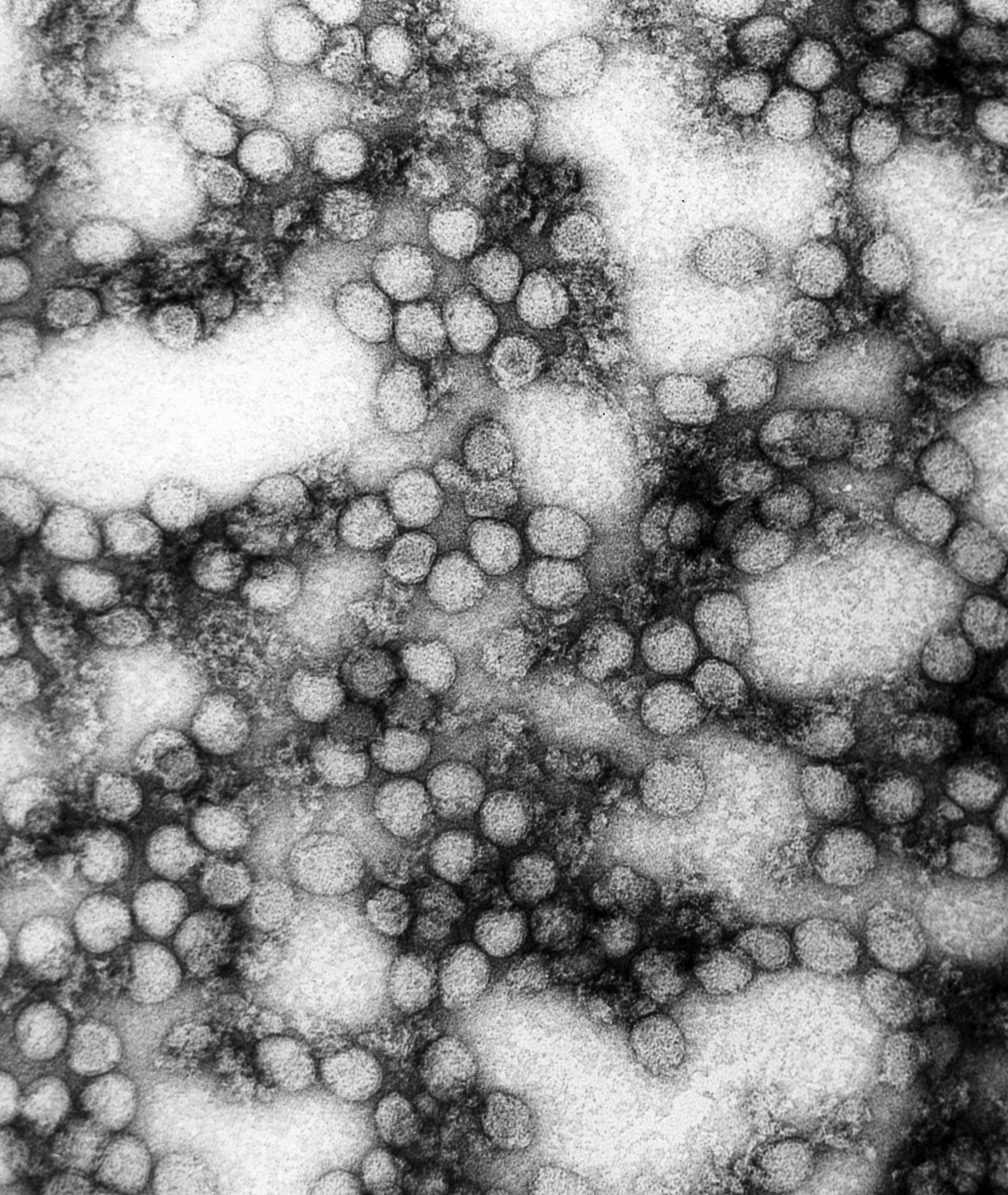
- A TEM micrograph of Yellow fever virus
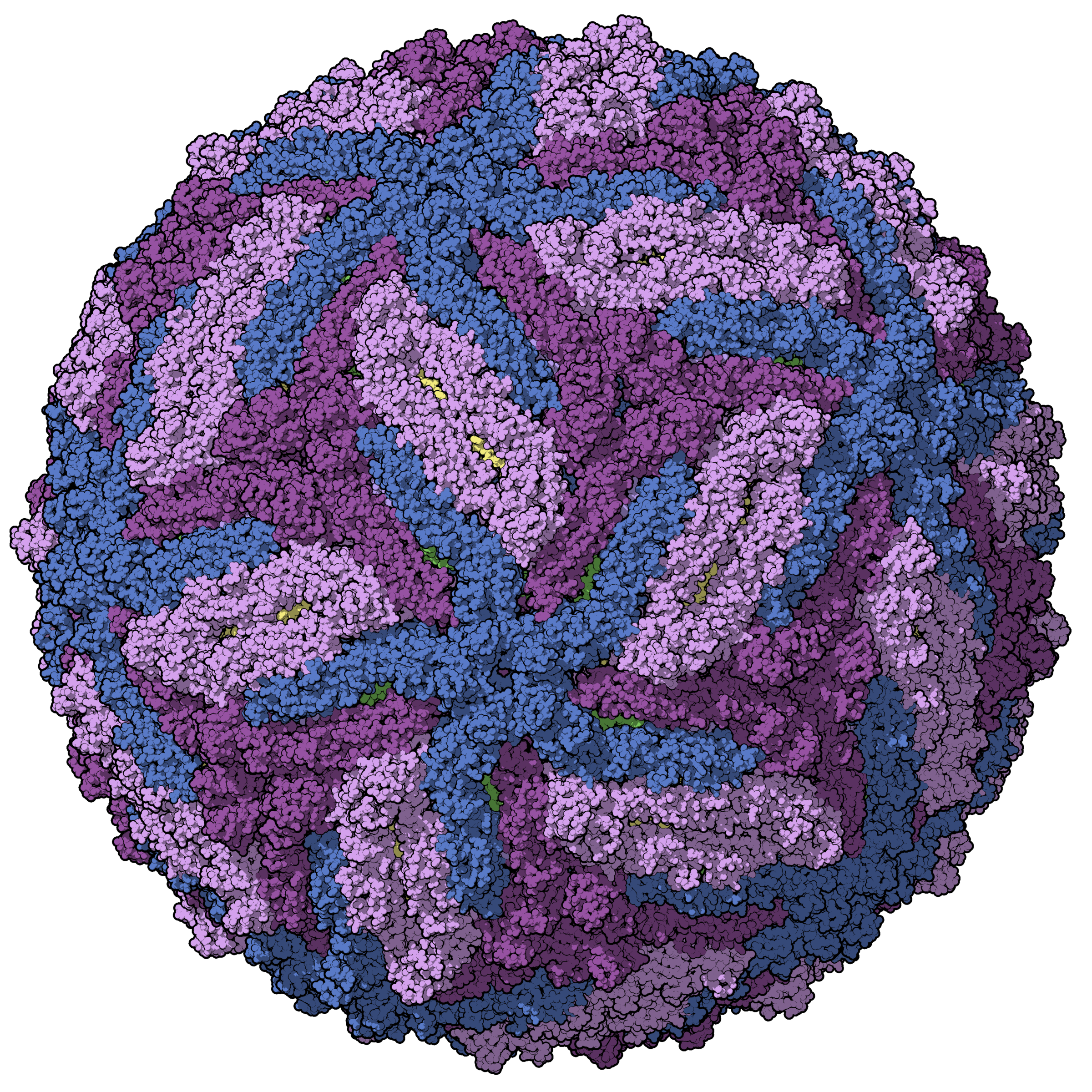
- Zika virus viral envelope model, colored by chains, PDB entry 5ire

Virus classification
- (unranked): Virus
- Realm: Riboviria
- Kingdom: Orthornavirae
- Phylum: Kitrinoviricota
- Class: Flasuviricetes
- Order: Amarillovirales
- Family: Flaviviridae
- Genus: Orthoflavivirus

Species
- See text

= Orthoflavivirus =

Genus of viruses

Orthoflavivirus (Flavivirus prior to 2023; common name orthoflavivirus, orthoflaviviral or orthoflaviviruses) is a genus of positive-strand RNA viruses in the family Flaviviridae. The genus includes the West Nile virus, dengue virus, tick-borne encephalitis virus, yellow fever virus, Zika virus and several other viruses which may cause encephalitis, as well as insect-specific flaviviruses (ISFs) such as cell fusing agent virus (CFAV), Palm Creek virus (PCV), and Parramatta River virus (PaRV). While dual-host flaviviruses can infect vertebrates as well as arthropods, insect-specific flaviviruses are restricted to their competent arthropods. The means by which flaviviruses establish persistent infection in their competent vectors and cause disease in humans depends upon several virus-host interactions, including the intricate interplay between flavivirus-encoded immune antagonists and the host antiviral innate immune effector molecules.

Orthoflaviviruses are named for the yellow fever virus; the word flavus means 'yellow' in Latin, and yellow fever in turn is named from its propensity to cause yellow jaundice in victims.

Orthoflaviviruses share several common aspects: common size (40–65 nm), symmetry (enveloped, icosahedral nucleocapsid), nucleic acid (positive-sense, single-stranded RNA around 10,000–11,000 bases), and appearance under the electron microscope.

Most of these viruses are primarily transmitted by the bite from an infected arthropod (mosquito or tick), and hence are classified as arboviruses. Human infections with most of these arboviruses are incidental, as humans are unable to replicate the virus to high enough titers to reinfect the arthropods needed to continue the virus life-cycle – humans are then a dead end host. The exceptions to this are the yellow fever virus, Dengue virus and Zika virus. These three viruses still require mosquito vectors but are well-enough adapted to humans as to not necessarily depend upon animal hosts (although they continue to have important animal transmission routes, as well).

Other virus transmission routes for arboviruses include handling infected animal carcasses, blood transfusion, sex, childbirth and consumption of unpasteurised milk products. Transmission from nonhuman vertebrates to humans without an intermediate vector arthropod however mostly occurs with low probability. For example, early tests with yellow fever showed that the disease is not contagious.

The known non-arboviruses of the flavivirus family reproduce in either arthropods or vertebrates, but not both, with one odd member of the genus affecting a nematode.

== History and name ==
Yellow fever is the first human viral disease extensively investigated and the nature of the infection established. In 1900, the U.S. military programme, the Yellow Fever Commission, announced that the disease was transmitted by mosquitoes. In 1927, a British physician Adrian Stokes identified the virus in Ghana.

Other viruses like West Nile virus, Japanese encephalitis virus, tick-borne encephalitis virus, Zika virus and dengue virus were subsequently discovered in the early 20th century. When the authority on viral classification, the International Committee on Nomenclature of Viruses (ICNV), published it first report in 1971, all the viruses were grouped under the genus Arbovirus group B. In 1974, the ICNV created a more technical name following biological nomenclature, Flavivirus; derived from Latin flavi 'yellow', as Yellow fever virus was accepted as the type species. ICNV also changed its name to the International Committee on Taxonomy of Viruses (ICTV). The family name Togaviridae was also created for the virus group, which was changed to Flaviviridae in 1984.

It was the customary to call members of Flaviviridae and its genus Flavivirus by common names like flavivirus, flaviviral, and flaviviruses. However, the confusion arose when other viruses of the family but different genera were described such as Hepacivirus, Pegivirus, and Pestivirus. To resolve the issue, ICTV decided in 2022 to change the genus name to Orthoflavivirus, which was adopted in 2023. By the new name, the genus Orthoflavivirus should be known by vernacular names like orthoflavivirus, orthoflaviviral or orthoflaviviruses. According to ICTV resolution:

To preclude this potential confusion, a taxonomic proposal (TaxoProp 2022.007S.A.Flaviviridae_1genren_sprenamed) was submitted to the ICTV in 2022. It proposed that the genus Flavivirus be renamed Orthoflavivirus, which roughly translates to "true flaviviruses" or "flaviviruses sensu stricto". This proposal was approved by the ICTV Executive Committee in late 2022 and ratified by the ICTV in April 2023 . Consequently, the terms "flaviviral", "flavivirus", and "flaviviruses" should be used to refer to the collective members of the family Flaviviridae, whereas the terms "orthoflaviviral", "orthoflavivirus", and "orthoflaviviruses" should be used for viruses of the genus Orthoflavivirus (all orthoflaviviruses are flaviviruses, but not all flaviviruses are orthoflaviviruses).

== Structure ==
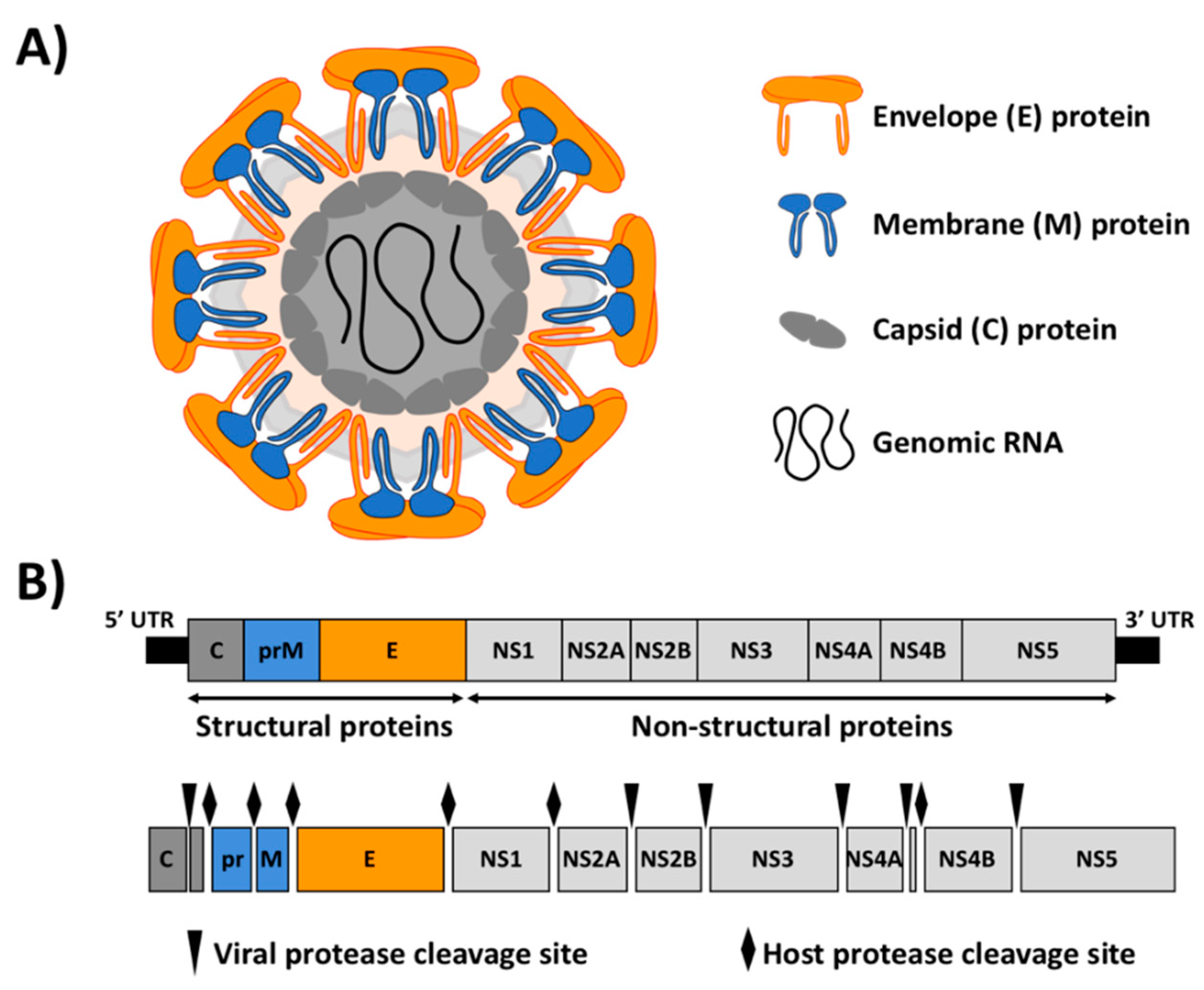
Zika virus structure and genome

Orthoflaviviruses are enveloped and spherical and have icosahedral geometries with a pseudo T=3 symmetry. The virus particle diameter is around 50 nm.

== Genome ==
Orthoflaviviruses have positive-sense, single-stranded RNA genomes which are non-segmented and around 10–11 kb in length. In general, the genome encodes three structural proteins (Capsid, prM, and Envelope) and seven non-structural proteins (NS1, NS2A, NS2B, NS3, NS4A, NS4B, NS5). The genomic RNA is modified at the 5′ end of positive-strand genomic RNA with a cap-1 structure (me^{7}-GpppA-me^{2}).

== Life cycle ==
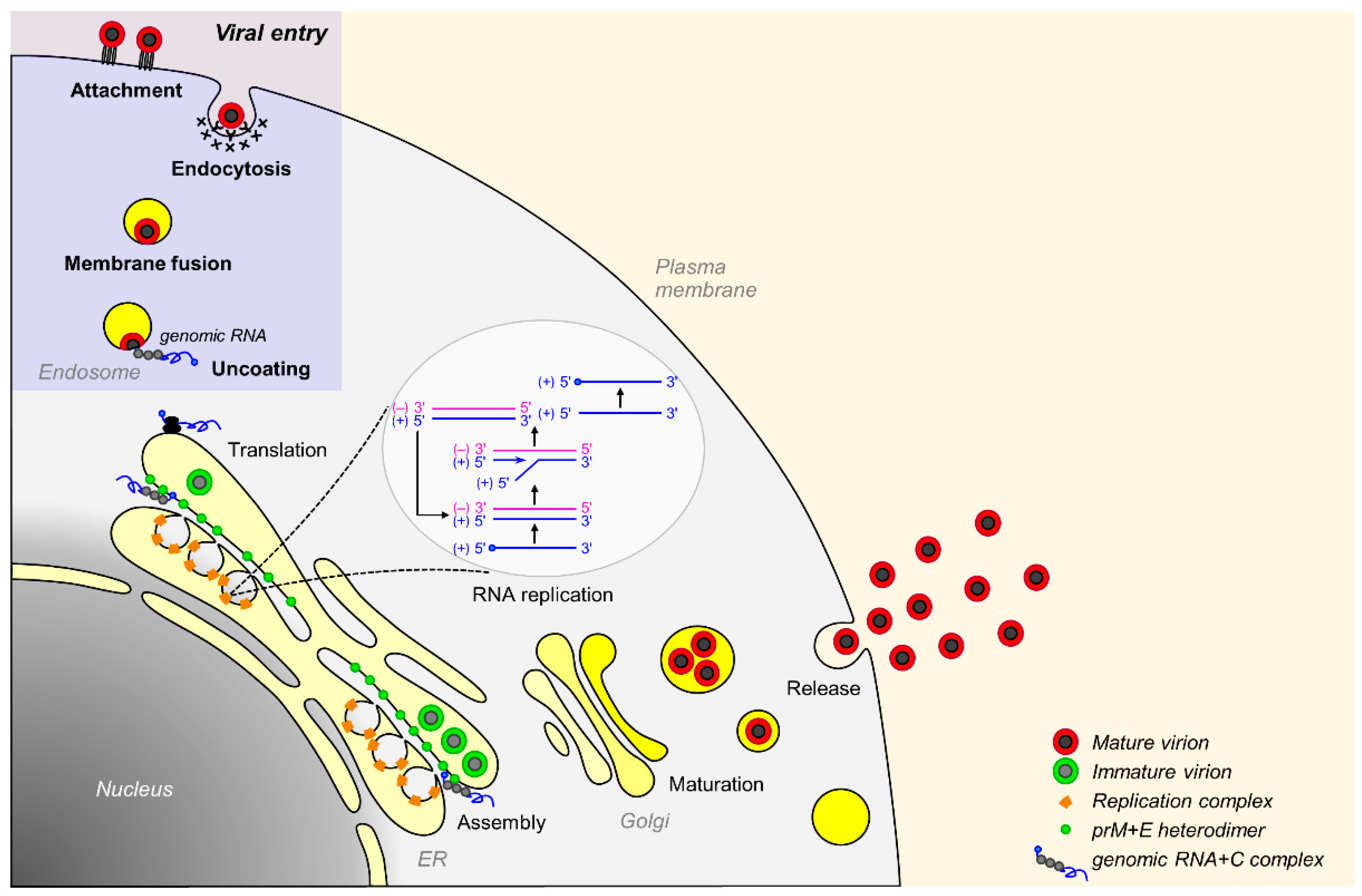
Replication of Japanese encephalitis virus (JEV)

Orthoflaviviruses replicate in the cytoplasm of the host cells. The genome mimics the cellular mRNA molecule in all aspects except for the absence of the poly-adenylated (poly-A) tail. This feature allows the virus to exploit cellular apparatuses to synthesize both structural and non-structural proteins, during replication. The cellular ribosome is crucial to the replication of the flavivirus, as it translates the RNA, in a similar fashion to cellular mRNA, resulting in the synthesis of a single polyprotein.

Cellular RNA cap structures are formed via the action of an RNA triphosphatase, with guanylyltransferase, N7-methyltransferase and 2′-O methyltransferase. The virus encodes these activities in its non-structural proteins. The NS3 protein encodes a RNA triphosphatase within its helicase domain. It uses the helicase ATP hydrolysis site to remove the γ-phosphate from the 5′ end of the RNA. The N-terminal domain of the non-structural protein 5 (NS5) has both the N7-methyltransferase and guanylyltransferase activities necessary for forming mature RNA cap structures. RNA binding affinity is reduced by the presence of ATP or GTP and enhanced by S-adenosyl methionine. This protein also encodes a 2′-O methyltransferase.

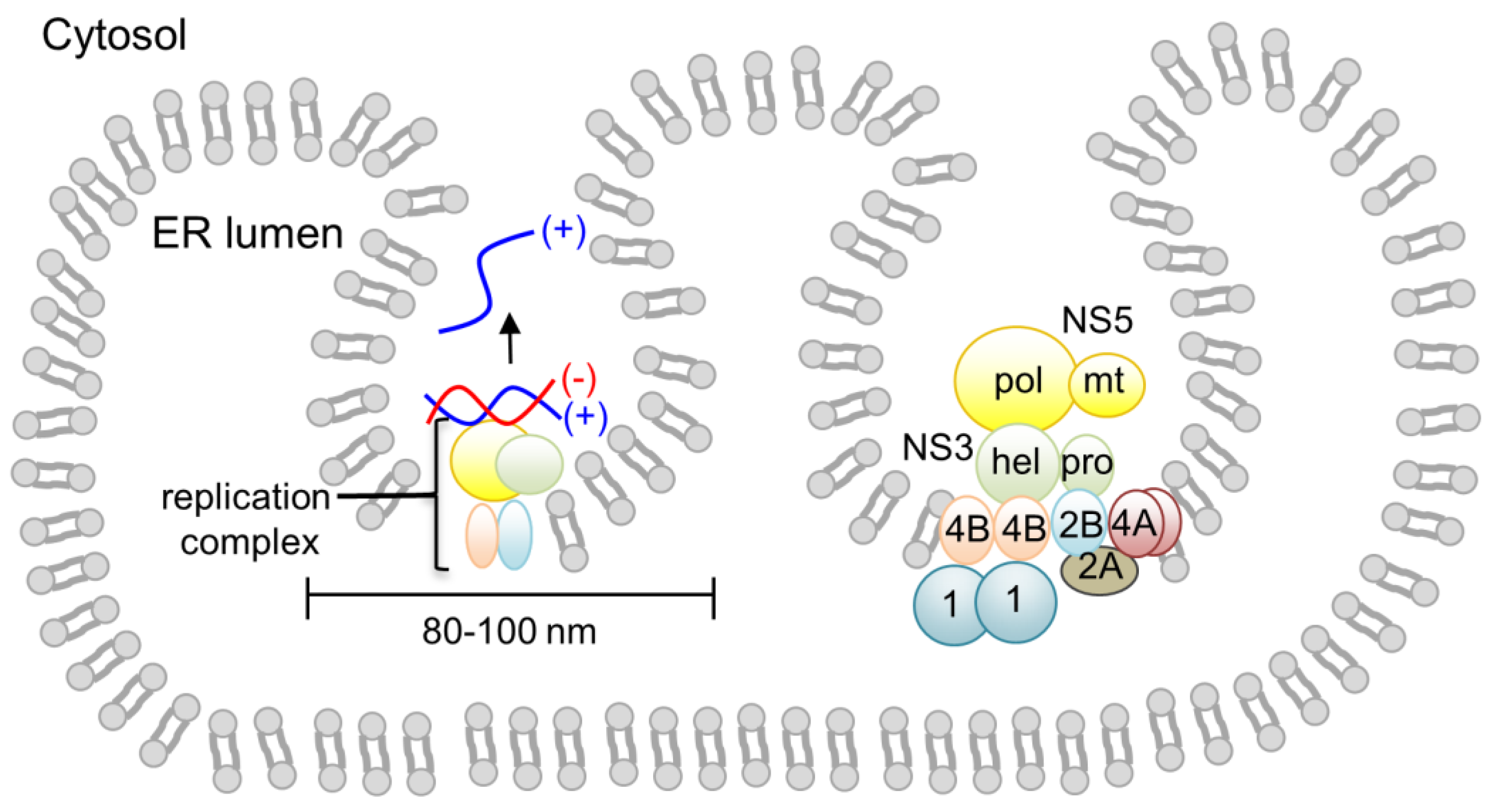
Replication complex formed on the cytoplasmic side of the ER membrane

Once translated, the polyprotein is cleaved by a combination of viral and host proteases to release mature polypeptide products. Nevertheless, cellular post-translational modification is dependent on the presence of a poly-A tail; therefore this process is not host-dependent. Instead, the poly-protein contains an autocatalytic feature which automatically releases the first peptide, a virus specific enzyme. This enzyme is then able to cleave the remaining poly-protein into the individual products. One of the products cleaved is a RNA-dependent RNA polymerase, responsible for the synthesis of a negative-sense RNA molecule. Consequently, this molecule acts as the template for the synthesis of the genomic progeny RNA.

Flavivirus genomic RNA replication occurs on rough endoplasmic reticulum membranes in membranous compartments. New viral particles are subsequently assembled. This occurs during the budding process which is also responsible for the accumulation of the envelope and cell lysis.

A G protein-coupled receptor kinase 2 (also known as ADRBK1) appears to be important in entry and replication for several viruses in Flaviviridae.

Humans, mammals, mosquitoes, and ticks serve as the natural host. Transmission routes are zoonosis and bite.

Genus	Host details	Tissue tropism	Entry details	Release details	Replication site	Assembly site	Transmission
Flavivirus	Humans; mammals; mosquitoes; ticks	Epithelium: skin; epithelium: kidney; epithelium: intestine; epithelium: testes	Clathrin-mediated endocytosis	Secretion	Cytoplasm	Cytoplasm	Zoonosis; arthropod bite

== RNA secondary structure elements ==
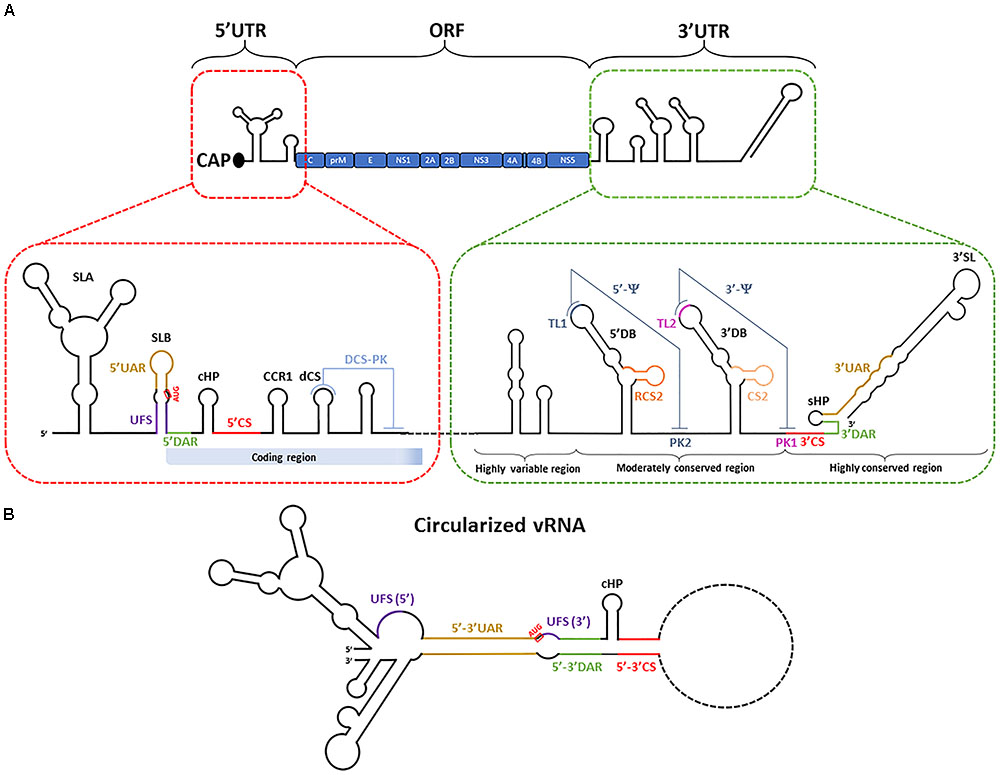
Flavivirus RNA genome showing the 3' and 5' UTRs and cyclisation

The positive sense RNA genome of Flavivirus contains 5' and 3' untranslated regions (UTRs).

=== 5'UTR ===
The 5'UTRs are 95–101 nucleotides long in Dengue virus. There are two conserved structural elements in the Flavivirus 5'UTR, a large stem loop (SLA) and a short stem loop (SLB). SLA folds into a Y-shaped structure with a side stem loop and a small top loop. SLA is likely to act as a promoter, and is essential for viral RNA synthesis. SLB is involved in interactions between the 5'UTR and 3'UTR which result in the cyclisation of the viral RNA, which is essential for viral replication.

=== 3'UTR ===
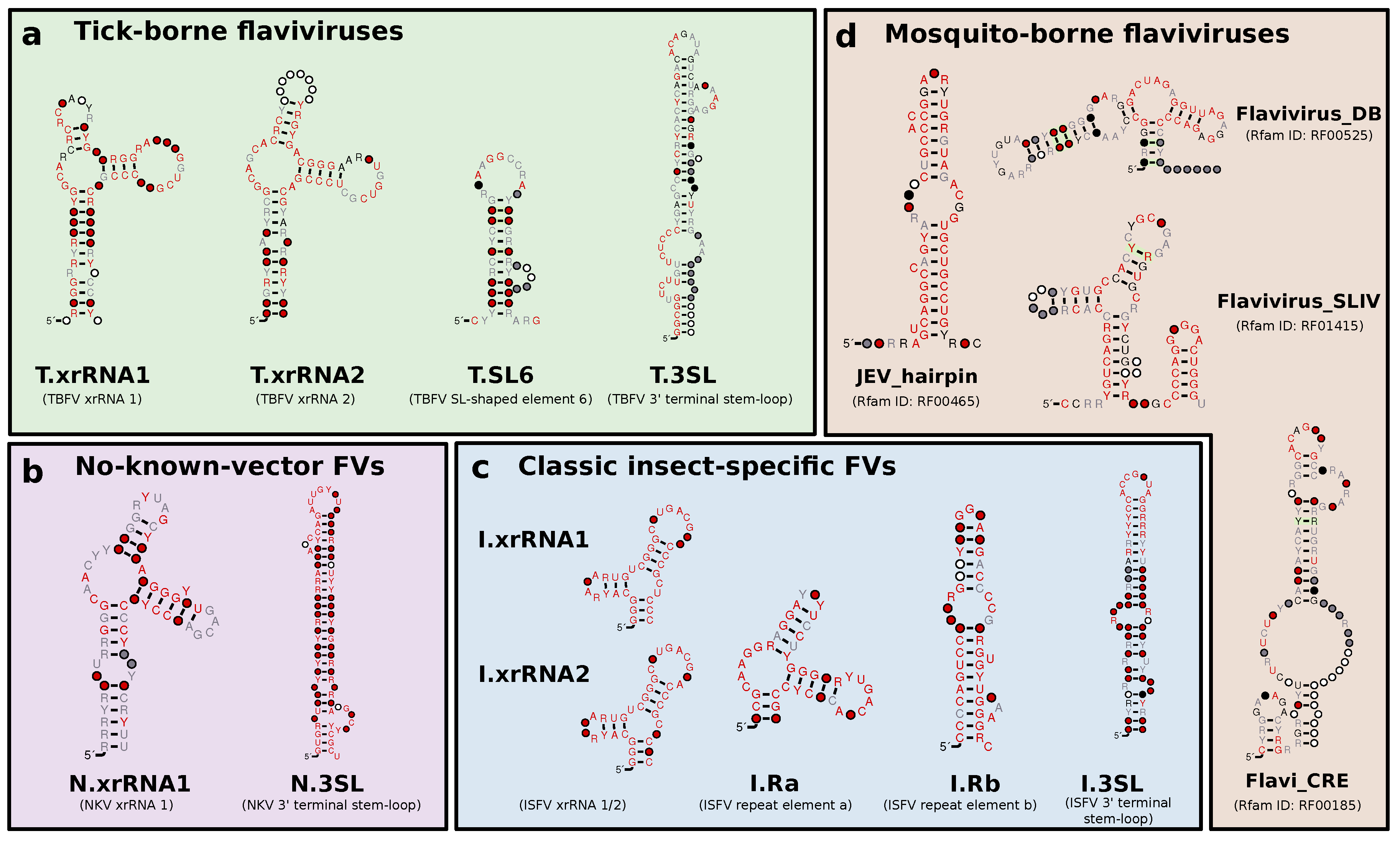
RNA secondary structure elements of different flavivirus 3′UTRs

The 3'UTRs are typically 0.3–0.5 kb in length and contain a number of highly conserved secondary structures which are conserved and restricted to orthoflaviviruses. The majority of analysis has been carried out using West Nile virus (WNV) to study the function the 3'UTR.

Currently 8 secondary structures have been identified within the 3'UTR of WNV and are (in the order in which they are found with the 3'UTR) SL-I, SL-II, SL-III, SL-IV, DB1, DB2 and CRE. Some of these secondary structures have been characterised and are important in facilitating viral replication and protecting the 3'UTR from 5' endonuclease digestion. Nuclease resistance protects the downstream 3' UTR RNA fragment from degradation and is essential for virus-induced cytopathicity and pathogenicity.

- SL-II

SL-II has been suggested to contribute to nuclease resistance. It may be related to another hairpin loop identified in the 5'UTR of the Japanese encephalitis virus (JEV) genome. The JEV hairpin is significantly over-represented upon host cell infection and it has been suggested that the hairpin structure may play a role in regulating RNA synthesis.

- SL-IV

This secondary structure is located within the 3'UTR of the genome of Flavivirus upstream of the DB elements. The function of this conserved structure is unknown but is thought to contribute to ribonuclease resistance.

- DB1/DB2

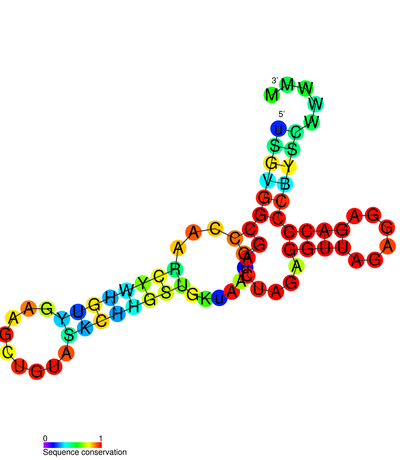
Secondary structure of the Flavivirus DB element

These two conserved secondary structures are also known as pseudo-repeat elements. They were originally identified within the genome of Dengue virus and are found adjacent to each other within the 3'UTR. They appear to be widely conserved across the Flaviviradae. These DB elements have a secondary structure consisting of three helices and they play a role in ensuring efficient translation. Deletion of DB1 has a small but significant reduction in translation but deletion of DB2 has little effect. Deleting both DB1 and DB2 reduced translation efficiency of the viral genome to 25%.

- CRE

CRE is the Cis-acting replication element, also known as the 3'SL RNA elements, and is thought to be essential in viral replication by facilitating the formation of a "replication complex". Although evidence has been presented for an existence of a pseudoknot structure in this RNA, it does not appear to be well conserved across orthoflaviviruses. Deletions of the 3' UTR of orthoflaviviruses have been shown to be lethal for infectious clones.

=== Conserved hairpin cHP ===
A conserved hairpin (cHP) structure was later found in several orthoflavivirus genomes and is thought to direct translation of capsid proteins. It is located just downstream of the AUG start codon.

== The role of RNA secondary structures in sfRNA production ==
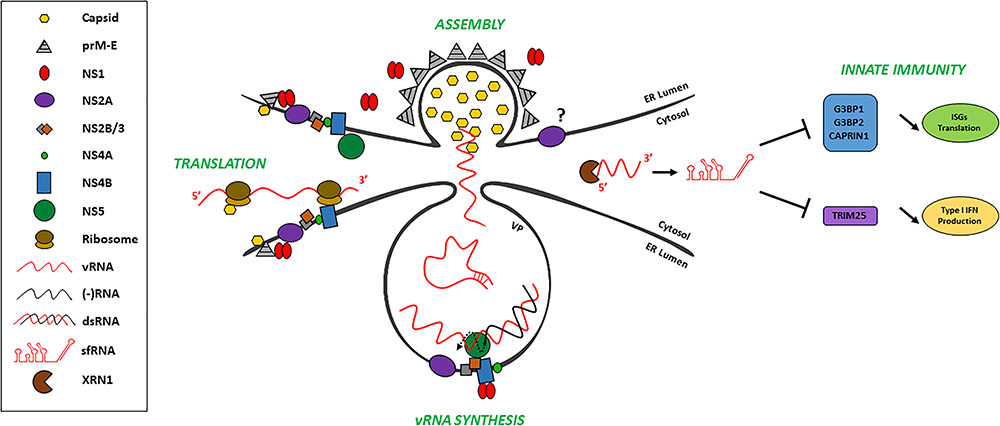
Different fates of viral RNA of orthoflaviviruses and formation of sfRNA

Subgenomic orthoflavivirus RNA (sfRNA) is an extension of the 3' UTR and has been demonstrated to play a role in flavivirus replication and pathogenesis. sfRNA is produced by incomplete degradation of genomic viral RNA by the host cells 5'-3' exoribonuclease 1 (XRN1). As the XRN1 degrades viral RNA, it stalls at stemloops formed by the secondary structure of the 5' and 3' UTR. This pause results in an undigested fragment of genome RNA known as sfRNA. sfRNA influences the life cycle of the flavivirus in a concentration dependent manner. Accumulation of sfRNA causes (1) antagonization of the cell's innate immune response, thus decreasing host defense against the virus (2) inhibition of XRN1 and Dicer activity to modify RNAi pathways that destroy viral RNA (3) modification of the viral replication complex to increase viral reproduction. Overall, sfRNA is implied in multiple pathways that compromise host defenses and promote infection by orthoflaviviruses.

== Evolution ==
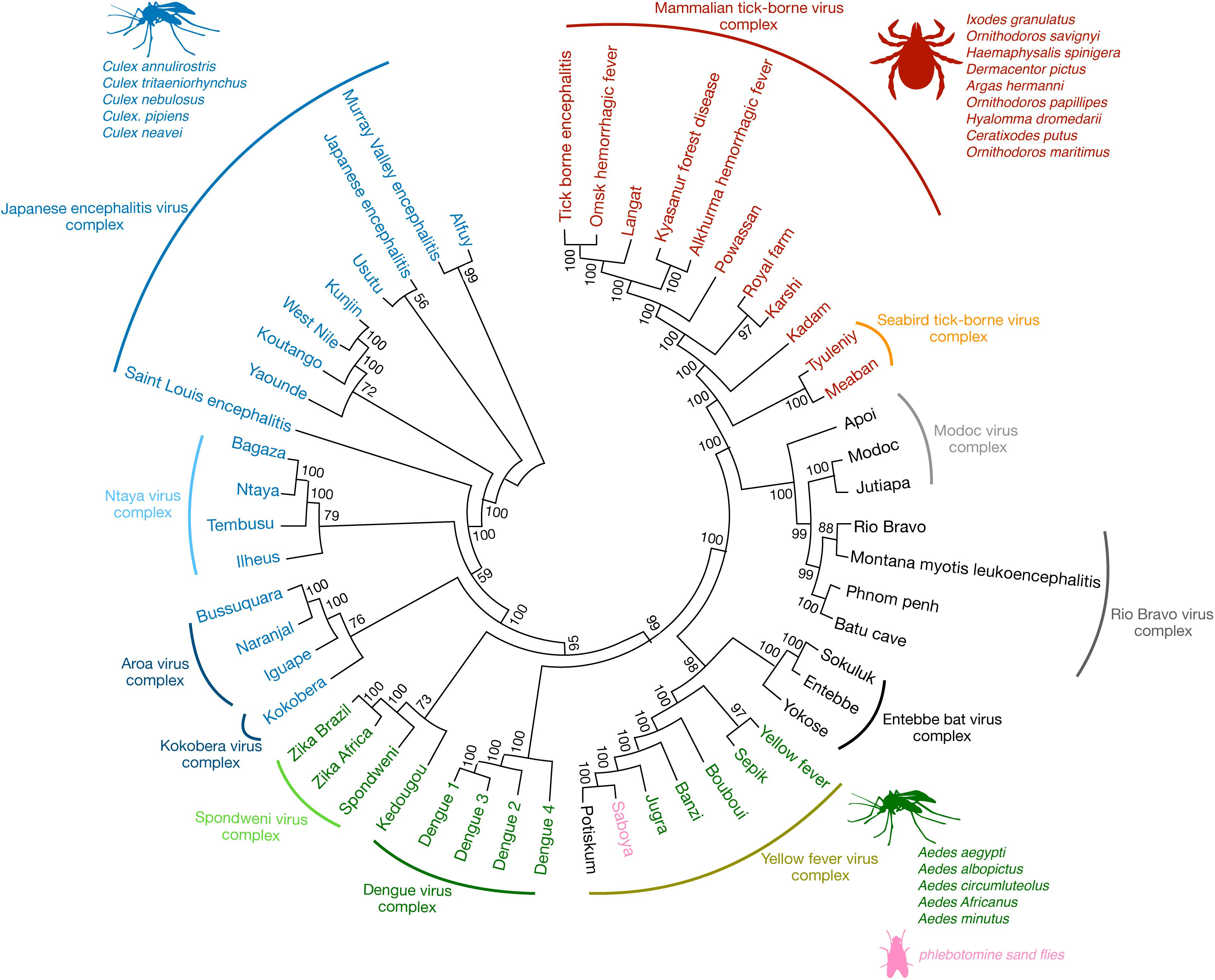
Phylogenetic tree of Flavivirus with corresponding vectors and groups

The ortholaviviruses can be divided into two clades: one with vector-borne viruses and the other with no known vector. The vector clade, in turn, can be subdivided into a mosquito-borne clade and a tick-borne clade. These groups can be divided again.

The mosquito group can be divided into two branches: one branch contains neurotropic viruses, often associated with encephalitic disease in humans or livestock. This branch tends to be spread by Culex species and to have bird reservoirs. The second branch is the non-neurotropic viruses associated with human haemorrhagic disease. These tend to have Aedes species as vectors and primate hosts.

The tick-borne viruses also form two distinct groups: one is associated with seabirds and the other – the tick-borne encephalitis complex viruses – is associated primarily with rodents.

The viruses that lack a known vector can be divided into three groups: one closely related to the mosquito-borne viruses, which is associated with bats; a second, genetically more distant, is also associated with bats; and a third group is associated with rodents.

Evolutionary relationships between endogenised viral elements of orthoflaviviruses and contemporary flaviviruses using maximum likelihood approaches have identified that arthropod-vectored flaviviruses likely emerged from an arachnid source. This contradicts earlier work with a smaller number of extant viruses showing that the tick-borne viruses emerged from a mosquito-borne group.

Several partial and complete genomes of orthoflaviviruses have been found in aquatic invertebrates such as the sea spider Endeis spinosa and several crustaceans and cephalopods. These sequences appear to be related to those in the insect-specific orthoflaviviruses and also the Tamana bat virus groupings. While it is not presently clear how aquatic orthoflaviviruses fit into the evolution of this group of viruses, there is some evidence that one of these viruses, Wenzhou shark flavivirus, infects both a crustacean (Portunus trituberculatus) Pacific spadenose shark (Scoliodon macrorhynchos) shark host, indicating an aquatic arbovirus life cycle.

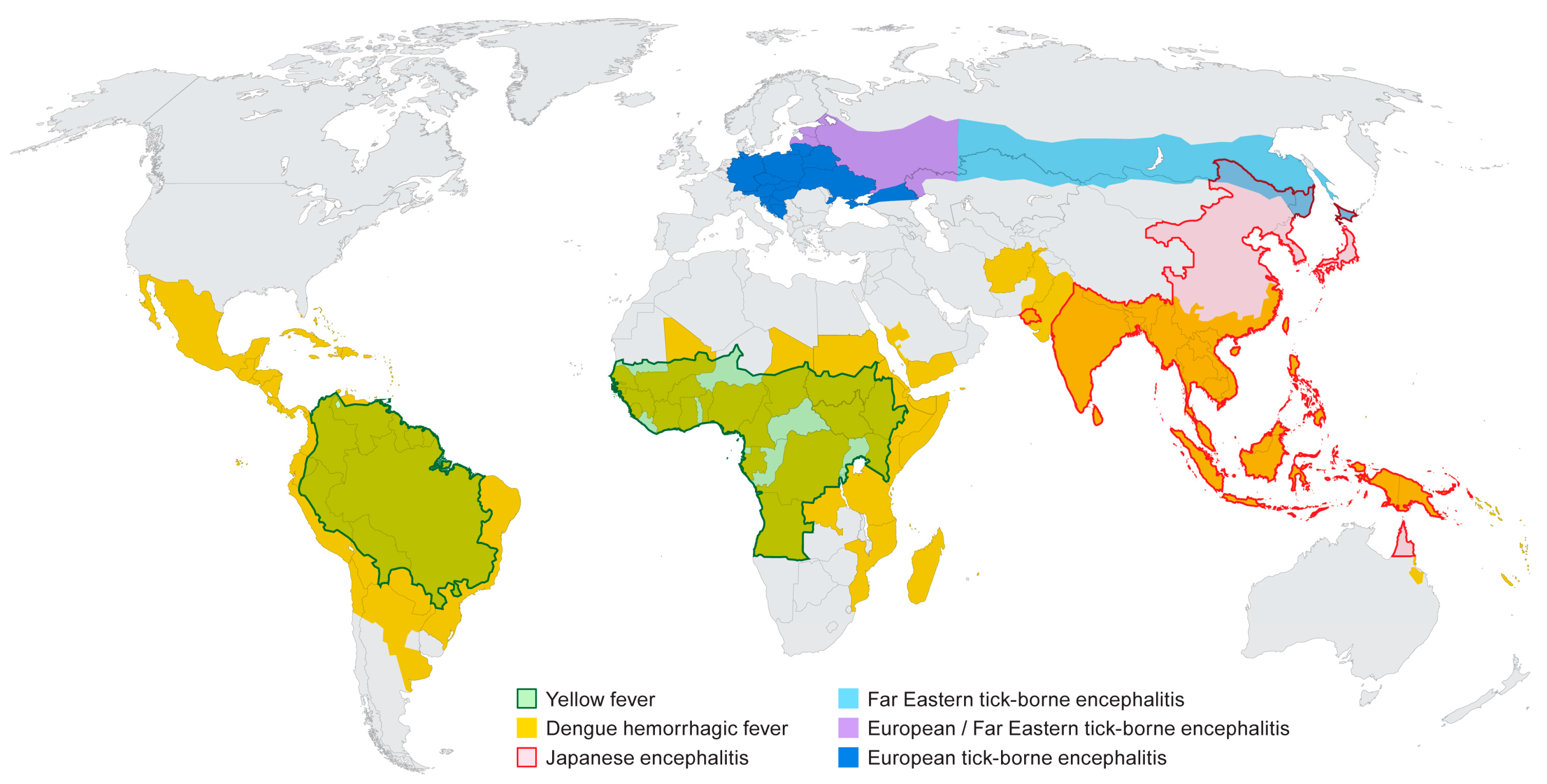
Distribution of major orthoflaviviruses

Estimates of divergence times have been made for several of these viruses. The origin of these viruses appears to be at least 9400 to 14,000 years ago. The Old World and New World dengue strains diverged between 150 and 450 years ago. The European and Far Eastern tick-borne encephalitis strains diverged about 1087 (1610–649) years ago. European tick-borne encephalitis and louping ill viruses diverged about 572 (844–328) years ago. This latter estimate is consistent with historical records. Kunjin virus diverged from West Nile virus approximately 277 (475–137) years ago. This time corresponds to the settlement of Australia from Europe. The Japanese encephalitis group appears to have evolved in Africa 2000–3000 years ago and then spread initially to South East Asia before migrating to the rest of Asia.

Phylogenetic studies of the West Nile virus has shown that it emerged as a distinct virus around 1000 years ago. This initial virus developed into two distinct lineages, lineage 1 and its multiple profiles is the source of the epidemic transmission in Africa and throughout the world. Lineage 2 was considered an Africa zoonosis. However, in 2008, lineage 2, previously only seen in horses in sub-Saharan Africa and Madagascar, began to appear in horses in Europe, where the first known outbreak affected 18 animals in Hungary in 2008. Lineage 1 West Nile virus was detected in South Africa in 2010 in a mare and her aborted fetus; previously, only lineage 2 West Nile virus had been detected in horses and humans in South Africa. A 2007 fatal case in a killer whale in Texas broadened the known host range of West Nile virus to include cetaceans.

Omsk haemorrhagic fever virus appears to have evolved within the last 1000 years. The viral genomes can be divided into 2 clades — A and B. Clade A has five genotypes, and clade B has one. These clades separated about 700 years ago. This separation appears to have occurred in the Kurgan province. Clade A subsequently underwent division into clade C, D and E 230 years ago. Clade C and E appear to have originated in the Novosibirsk and Omsk Provinces, respectively. The muskrat Ondatra zibethicus, which is highly susceptible to this virus, was introduced into this area in the 1930s.

== Taxonomy ==
=== Species ===
The genus contains the following species, listed by subgenus and scientific name and followed by the exemplar virus of the species:

Subgenus: Crangovirus

- Orthoflavivirus aphei, Crangon crangon flavivirus
- Subgenus: Euflavivirus
- Orthoflavivirus apoiense, Apoi virus
- Orthoflavivirus aroaense, Aroa virus
- Orthoflavivirus bagazaense, Bagaza virus
- Orthoflavivirus banziense, Banzi virus
- Orthoflavivirus boubouiense, Bouboui virus
- Orthoflavivirus bravoense, Rio Bravo virus
- Orthoflavivirus bukalasaense, Bukalasa bat virus
- Orthoflavivirus cacipacoreense, Cacipacore virus
- Orthoflavivirus careyense, Carey Island virus
- Orthoflavivirus cowboneense, Cowbone Ridge virus
- Orthoflavivirus dakarense, Dakar bat virus
- Orthoflavivirus denguei, Dengue virus
- Orthoflavivirus edgehillense, Edge Hill virus
- Orthoflavivirus entebbeense, Entebbe bat virus
- Orthoflavivirus flavi, Yellow fever virus
- Orthoflavivirus gadgetsense, Gadgets Gully virus
- Orthoflavivirus ilheusense, Ilheus virus
- Orthoflavivirus israelense, Israel turkey meningoencephalomyelitis virus
- Orthoflavivirus japonicum, Japanese encephalitis virus
- Orthoflavivirus jugraense, Jugra virus
- Orthoflavivirus jutiapaense, Jutiapa virus
- Orthoflavivirus kadamense, Kadam virus
- Orthoflavivirus kedougouense, Kedougou virus
- Orthoflavivirus kokoberaorum, Kokobera virus
- Orthoflavivirus koutangoense, Koutango virus
- Orthoflavivirus kyasanurense, Kyasanur Forest disease virus
- Orthoflavivirus langatense, Langat virus
- Orthoflavivirus louisense, Saint Louis encephalitis virus
- Orthoflavivirus loupingi, Louping ill virus
- Orthoflavivirus meabanense, Meaban virus
- Orthoflavivirus mediterranense, Turkish sheep encephalitis virus
- Orthoflavivirus modocense, Modoc virus
- Orthoflavivirus montanaense, Montana myotis leukoencephalitis virus
- Orthoflavivirus murrayense, Murray Valley encephalitis virus
- Orthoflavivirus neudoerflense, Tick-borne encephalitis virus 2
- Orthoflavivirus nilense, West Nile virus
- Orthoflavivirus ntayaense, Ntaya virus
- Orthoflavivirus omskense, Omsk hemorrhagic fever virus
- Orthoflavivirus perlitaense, San Perlita virus
- Orthoflavivirus phnompenhense, Phnom Penh bat virus
- Orthoflavivirus powassanense, Powassan virus
- Orthoflavivirus royalense, Royal Farm virus
- Orthoflavivirus saboyaense, Saboya virus
- Orthoflavivirus saumarezense, Saumarez Reef virus
- Orthoflavivirus sepikense, Sepik virus
- Orthoflavivirus tembusu, Tembusu virus
- Orthoflavivirus tyuleniyense, Tyuleniy virus
- Orthoflavivirus ugandaense, Uganda S virus
- Orthoflavivirus usutuense, Usutu virus
- Orthoflavivirus viejaense, Sal Vieja virus
- Orthoflavivirus wesselsbronense, Wesselsbron virus
- Orthoflavivirus yaoundeense, Yaounde virus
- Orthoflavivirus yokoseense, Yokose virus
- Orthoflavivirus zikaense, Zika virus
- Orthoflavivirus zilberi, Tick-borne encephalitis virus 1

Subgenus: Fusivirus

- Orthoflavivirus iunctionis, Cell-fusing agent virus

=== Sorted by vector ===
List of species and strains of flavivirus by vector

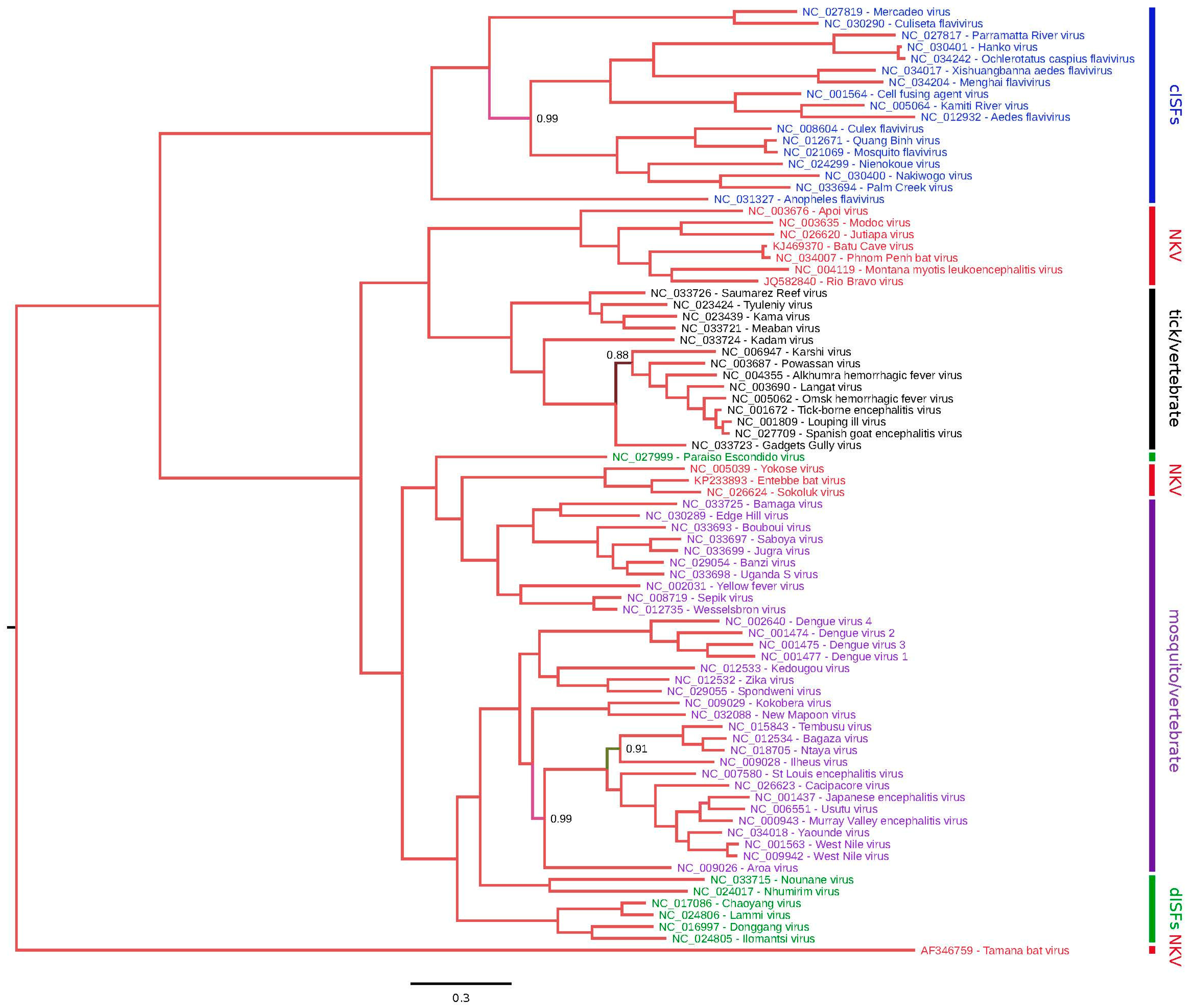
Phylogenetic tree of Flavivirus with vectors; tick-borne (black), mosquito-borne (purple), with no known vector (red), invertebrate viruses (blue/green)

Species and strains sorted by vectors:

=== Tick-borne viruses ===
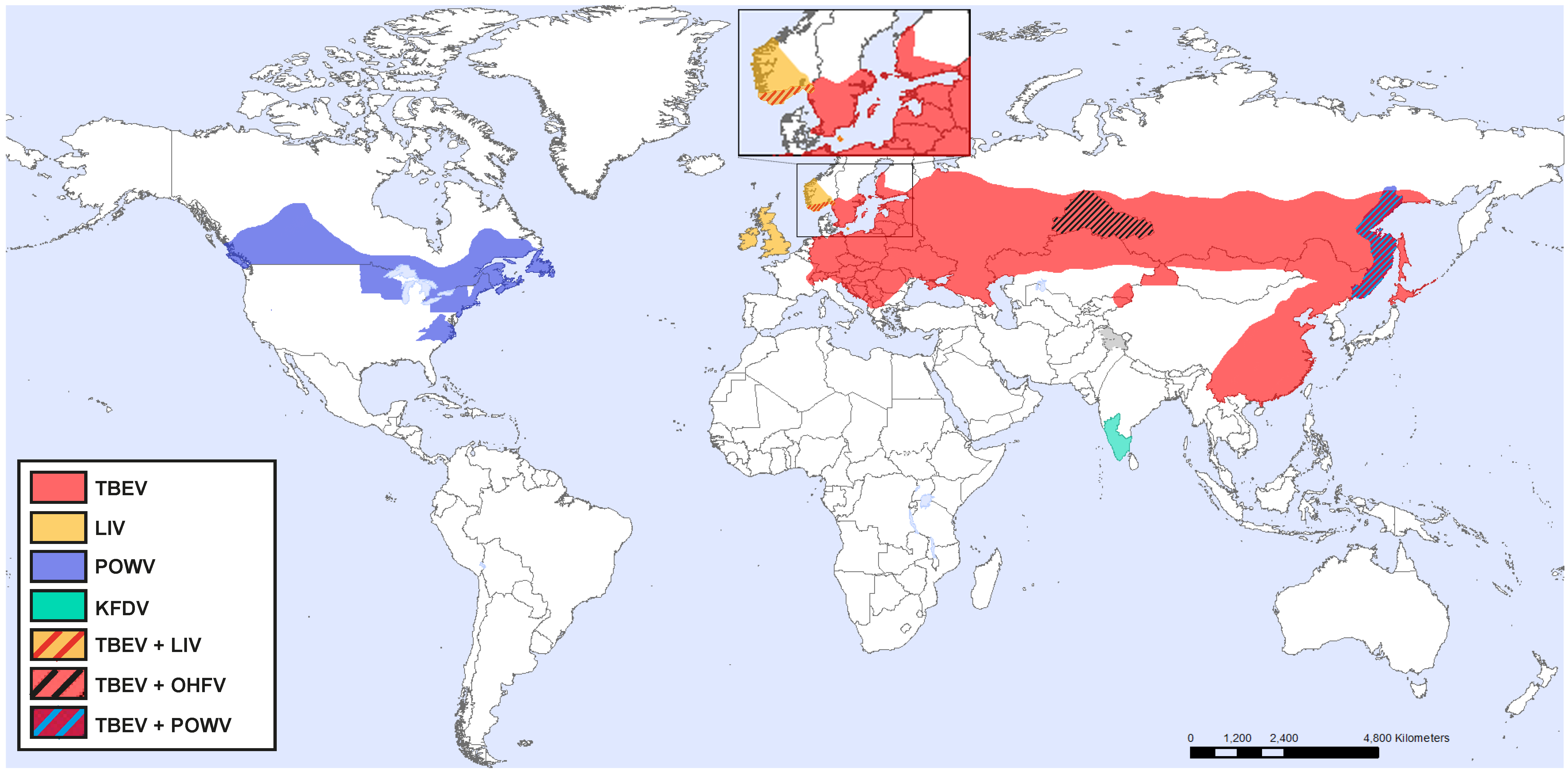
Distribution of tick-borne encephalitis virus (TBEV), Kyasanur forest disease virus (KFDV), Omsk hemorrhagic fever virus (OHFV), Powassan virus (POWV), and Louping-ill virus (LIV)

Mammalian tick-borne virus group

- Greek goat encephalitis virus (GGEV)
- Kadam virus (KADV)
- Krasnodar virus (KRDV)
- Mogiana tick virus (MGTV)
- Ngoye virus (NGOV)
- Sokuluk virus (SOKV)
- Spanish sheep encephalomyelitis virus (SSEV)
- Turkish sheep encephalitis virus (TSE)
- Tick-borne encephalitis virus serocomplex
  - Absettarov virus
  - Deer tick virus (DT)
  - Gadgets Gully virus (GGYV)
  - Karshi virus
  - Kyasanur Forest disease virus (KFDV)
    - Alkhurma hemorrhagic fever virus (ALKV)
  - Langat virus (LGTV)
  - Louping ill virus (LIV)
  - Omsk hemorrhagic fever virus (OHFV)
  - Powassan virus (POWV)
  - Royal Farm virus (RFV)
  - Tick-borne encephalitis virus (TBEV)

Seabird tick-borne virus group

- Kama virus (KAMV)
- Meaban virus (MEAV)
- Saumarez Reef virus (SREV)
- Tyuleniy virus (TYUV)

=== Mosquito-borne viruses ===
- Without known vertebrate host
  - Cell fusing clade
    - Aedes flavivirus
    - Cell fusing agent virus
  - Aedes galloisi flavivirus
  - Barkedji virus
  - Calbertado virus
  - Chaoyang virus
  - Culex flavivirus
  - Culex theileri flavivirus
    - Spanish Culex flavivirus
    - Wang Thong virus
  - Culiseta flavivirus
  - Donggang virus
  - Hanko virus
    - Ochlerotatus caspius flavivirus
    - Spanish Ochlerotatus flavivirus
  - Ilomantsi virus
  - Kamiti River virus
  - Lammi virus
  - Marisma mosquito virus
  - Nakiwogo virus
  - Nhumirim virus
  - Nienokoue virus
  - Nounané virus
  - Palm Creek virus
  - Panmunjeom flavivirus
  - Quang Binh virus
    - Yunnan Culex flavivirus
- Aroa virus group
  - Aroa virus (AROAV)
  - Bussuquara virus (BSQV)
  - Iguape virus (IGUV)
  - Naranjal virus (NJLV)
- Dengue virus group
  - Dengue virus (DENV)
  - Kedougou virus (KEDV)
- Japanese encephalitis virus group
  - Cacipacore virus (CPCV)
  - Koutango virus (KOUV)
  - Kunjin virus
  - Ilheus virus (ILHV)
  - Japanese encephalitis virus (JEV)
  - Murray Valley encephalitis virus (MVEV)
    - Alfuy virus
  - St. Louis encephalitis virus (SLEV)
  - Usutu virus (USUV)
  - West Nile virus (WNV)
  - Yaounde virus (YAOV)
- Kokobera virus group
  - Kokobera virus (KOKV)
  - New Mapoon virus (NMV)
  - Stratford virus (STRV)
- Ntaya virus group
  - Bagaza virus (BAGV)
  - Baiyangdian virus (BYDV)
  - Duck egg drop syndrome virus (DEDSV)
  - Ilheus virus (ILHV)
  - Israel turkey meningoencephalomyelitis virus (ITV)
  - Jiangsu virus (JSV)
  - Layer flavivirus
  - Ntaya virus (NTAV)
  - Rocio virus (ROCV)
  - Sitiawan virus (STWV)
  - T'Ho virus
  - Tembusu virus (TMUV)
- Spondweni virus group
  - Spondweni virus (SPOV)
  - Zika virus (ZIKV)
- Yellow fever virus group
  - Banzi virus (BANV)
  - Bamaga virus (BGV)
  - Bouboui virus (BOUV)
  - Edge Hill virus (EHV)
  - Fitzroy river virus
  - Jugra virus (JUGV)
  - Saboya virus (SABV)
  - Sepik virus (SEPV)
  - Uganda S virus (UGSV)
  - Wesselsbron virus (WESSV)
  - Yellow fever virus (YFV)
- Others
  - Batu cave virus
  - Bukulasa bat virus
  - Nanay virus
  - Rabensburg virus (RABV)
  - Sitiawan virus

=== Viruses with no known arthropod vector ===
- Tamana bat virus (TABV)
- Entebbe virus group
  - Entebbe bat virus (ENTV)
    - Sokoluk virus
  - Yokose virus (YOKV)
- Modoc virus group
  - Apoi virus (APOIV)
  - Cowbone Ridge virus (CRV)
  - Jutiapa virus (JUTV)
  - Modoc virus (MODV)
  - Sal Vieja virus (SVV)
  - San Perlita virus (SPV)
- Rio Bravo virus group
  - Bukalasa bat virus (BBV)
  - Carey Island virus (CIV)
  - Dakar bat virus (DBV)
  - Montana myotis leukoencephalitis virus (MMLV)
  - Phnom Penh bat virus (PPBV)
  - Rio Bravo virus (RBV)

=== Non vertebrate viruses ===
- Assam virus
- Bamaga virus
- Crangon crangon flavivirus
- Cuacua virus
- Donggang virus
- Firefly squid flavivirus
- Gammarus chevreuxi flavivirus
- Gammarus pulex flavivirus
- Karumba virus (KRBV)
- Hanko virus
- Haslams Creek virus
- Mac Peak virus (McPV)
- Marisma mosquito virus
- Mediterranean Ochlerotatus flavivirus
- Menghai flavivirus
- Nakiwogo virus (NAKV)
- Nanay virus
- Nounané virus
- Ochlerotatus caspius flavivirus
- Palm Creek virus
- Parramatta River virus
- Southern Pygmy squid flavivirus
- Soybean cyst nematode virus 5
- Xishuangbanna Aedes flavivirus

=== Viruses known only from sequencing ===
- Aedes flavivirus
- Aedes cinereus flavivirus
- Aedes vexans flavivirus
- Culex theileri flavivirus

== Vaccines ==
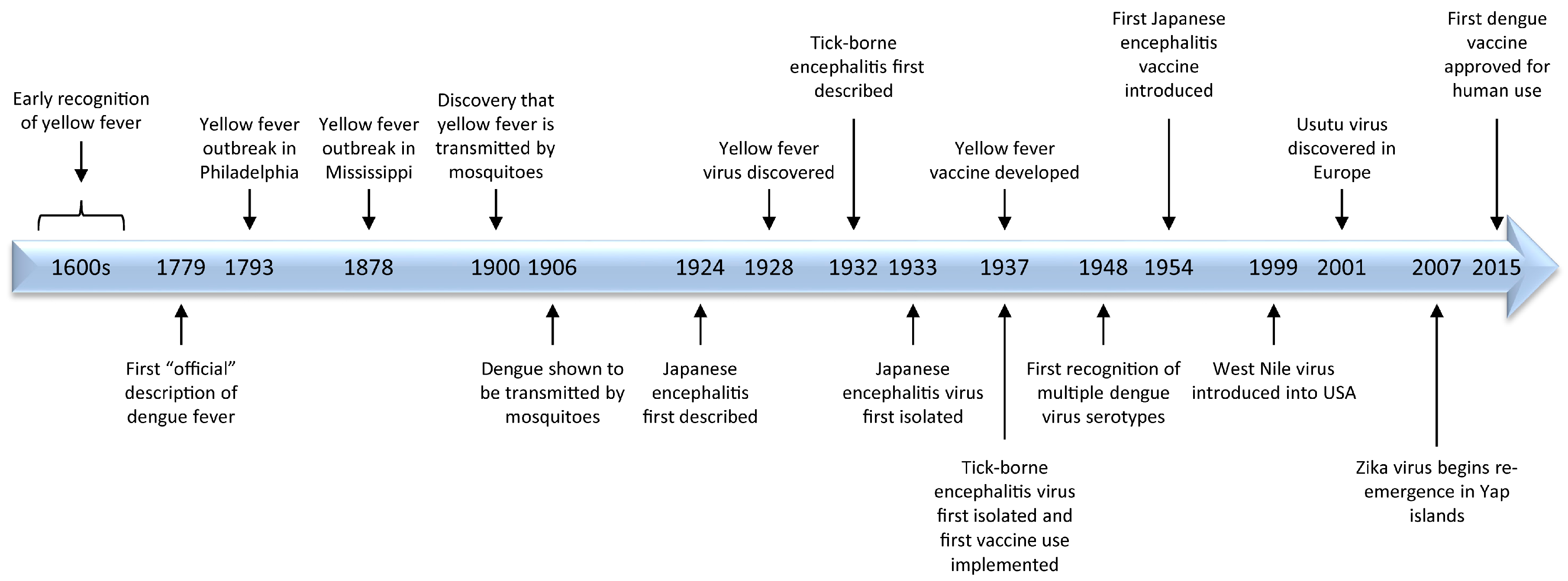
Time-line of historical highlights of flavivirus research

The very successful yellow fever 17D vaccine, introduced in 1937, produced dramatic reductions in epidemic activity.

Effective inactivated Japanese encephalitis and Tick-borne encephalitis vaccines were introduced in the middle of the 20th century. Unacceptable adverse events have prompted change from a mouse-brain inactivated Japanese encephalitis vaccine to safer and more effective second generation Japanese encephalitis vaccines. These may come into wide use to effectively prevent this severe disease in the huge populations of Asia—North, South and Southeast.

The dengue viruses produce many millions of infections annually due to transmission by a successful global mosquito vector. As mosquito control has failed, several dengue vaccines are in varying stages of development. CYD-TDV, sold under the trade name Dengvaxia, is a tetravalent chimeric vaccine that splices structural genes of the four dengue viruses onto a 17D yellow fever backbone. Dengvaxia is approved in five countries.

An alternate approach to the development of flavivirus vaccine vectors is based on the use of viruses that infect insects. Insect-specific flaviviruses, such as Binjari virus, are unable to replicate in vertebrate cells. Nevertheless, recombinant viruses in which structural protein genes (prME) of Binjari virus are exchanged with those of dengue virus, Zika virus, West Nile virus, yellow fever virus, or Japanese encephalitis virus replicate efficiently in insect cells where high titers of infectious virus particles are produced. Immunization of mice with a Binjari vaccine bearing the Zika virus structural proteins protected mice from disease after challenge. A similar approach employs the insect-specific alphavirus Eilat virus as a vaccine platform. ... These new vaccine platforms generated from insect-specific flaviviruses and alphaviruses represent affordable, efficient, and safe approaches to rapid development of infectious, attenuated vaccines against pathogens from these two virus families.
