= OHF =

OHF may refer to:

- Olympus Has Fallen, a 2013 American action-thriller film
- Oceania Handball Federation, the administrative and controlling body for Oceanian team handball
- Omsk hemorrhagic fever, a viral hemorrhagic fever caused by a Flavivirus
- One Hour Photo, a 2002 American psychological thriller film
- Ontario Hockey Federation, a governing body of ice hockey in the province of Ontario
- Open hearth furnace, a kind of furnace for producing steel
- Opinbert hlutafélag (ohf.), a form of government-owned corporation in Iceland
