= Gadgets Gully virus =

Virus classification
- (unranked): Virus
- Realm: Riboviria
- Kingdom: Orthornavirae
- Phylum: Kitrinoviricota
- Class: Flasuviricetes
- Order: Amarillovirales
- Family: Flaviviridae
- Genus: Orthoflavivirus
- Subgenus: Euflavivirus
- Species: Orthoflavivirus gadgetsense

Species of virus

Gadgets Gully virus (GGYV) is an arbovirus, a member of the genus Orthoflavivirus (family Flaviviridae) isolated first time from a hard tick Ixodes uriae, and named after Gadget's Gully on Macquarie Island in the southwest Pacific Ocean. Antibodies to the virus have been found in humans and in several species of penguin. Certain species of seabird are thought to be the natural reservoirs of the virus.

== Intraspecies genetic diversity ==
The delimitation analysis demonstrated that two isolates of GGYV available in GenBank and collected from Australia and Antarctica can be considered as two different virus species.
