= Kadam virus =

Virus classification
- (unranked): Virus
- Realm: Riboviria
- Kingdom: Orthornavirae
- Phylum: Kitrinoviricota
- Class: Flasuviricetes
- Order: Amarillovirales
- Family: Flaviviridae
- Genus: Orthoflavivirus
- Subgenus: Euflavivirus
- Species: Orthoflavivirus kadamense

Species of virus

Kadam virus (or KAD, strain MP6640) is a tick-borne flavivirus belonging to the genus Orthoflavivirus.

== Located ==
The virus was first isolated by the Uganda Virus Research Institute in Entebbe, Uganda, after samples were taken from cattle in Karamoja in 1967. The viruses were usually only found from Rhipicephalus and Amblyomma ticks around Kenya and Uganda infecting cattle and humans.

== Spread ==
In the early 1980s, Kadam virus was found to be spread in Saudi Arabia by Hyalomma ticks when found on a dead camel at Wadi Thamamah in Riyadh.
