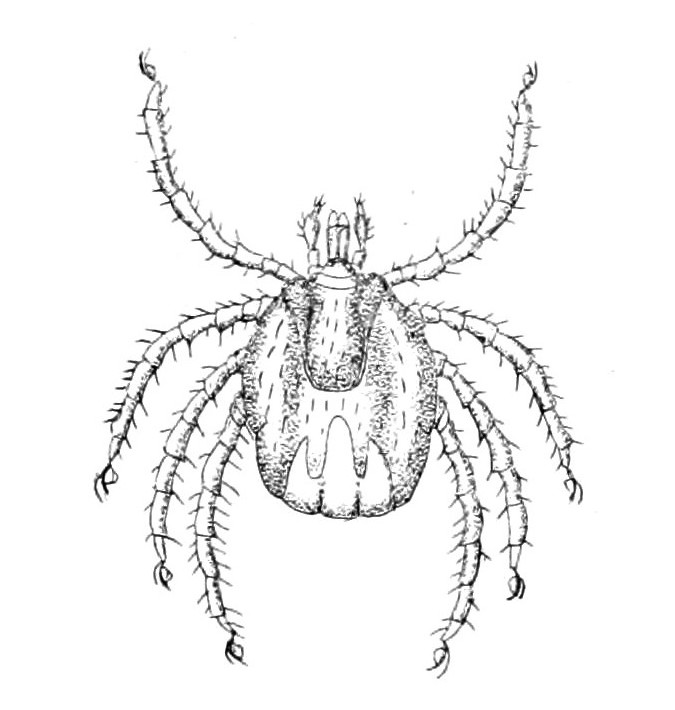

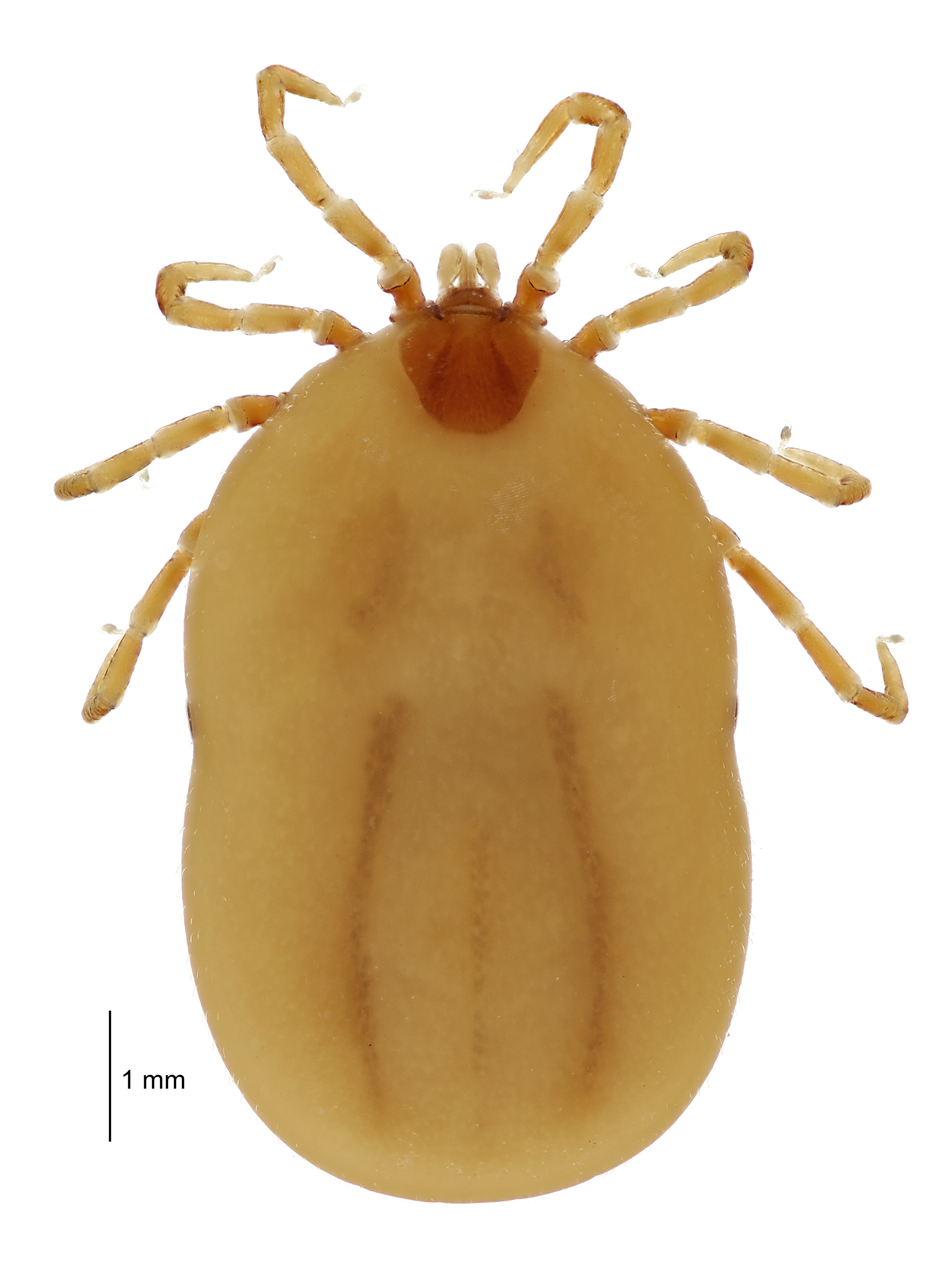

Scientific classification
- Kingdom: Animalia
- Phylum: Arthropoda
- Subphylum: Chelicerata
- Class: Arachnida
- Order: Ixodida
- Family: Ixodidae
- Genus: Ixodes
- Species: I. uriae

Binomial name
- Ixodes uriae White, 1852

= Ixodes uriae =

Species of tick

Ixodes uriae, also known as the seabird tick, is a species of parasitic tick known to infest marine birds. It is native to many high latitude areas in the northern and southern hemispheres including Alaska, Canada, Faroe Islands, Iceland, Greenland, England, Scotland, Norway, Finland, the Kola Peninsula, Russia, Patagonia, South Africa and Australia.

== Life cycle ==
A study examined the life cycle of the tick in colonies of king penguin and macaroni penguin. It was found that on the king penguin, the cycle took three years and the period for engorgement was limited to 3.5–4.5 months each year even though penguins occupied the site throughout the year. The ticks nearly all overwintered in the unengorged state. In contrast, the cycle took two years in the macaroni penguin in consequence of the rather different timetable of occupation of the colony for breeding and moulting in this species.

A study in an Adelie penguin colony found that the tick had alternate periods of feeding and off-host aggregation under rocks. The engorged ticks found an aggregation site with the help of a pheromone released by other ticks. Guanine, the major excretory product of ticks, encouraged assembly. Non-fed stages responded positively to guano and uric acid, excretory products of the penguins, suggesting that these act as a kairomone to help them locate their host. After feeding, the immature ticks' response to both the assembly and kairomones ceased for a few days until after they had moulted.

== Vector ==
Ixodes uriae has been shown to be a vector of Borrelia garinii, a species of spirochaete that causes Lyme disease in humans. However, in order for the bacterium to infect humans, another species of tick would have to be involved, Ixodes scapularis which is found on deer. Cross infection between seabirds and deer is uncommon because they do not share the same habitat so the risk to human health of infected Ixodes uriae is minimal.

In 1975, the Nugget virus (Kemerovo or Great Island virus serogroup) and Taggert virus (Sakhalin serogroup) were isolated from Ixodes uriae from Macquarie Island.

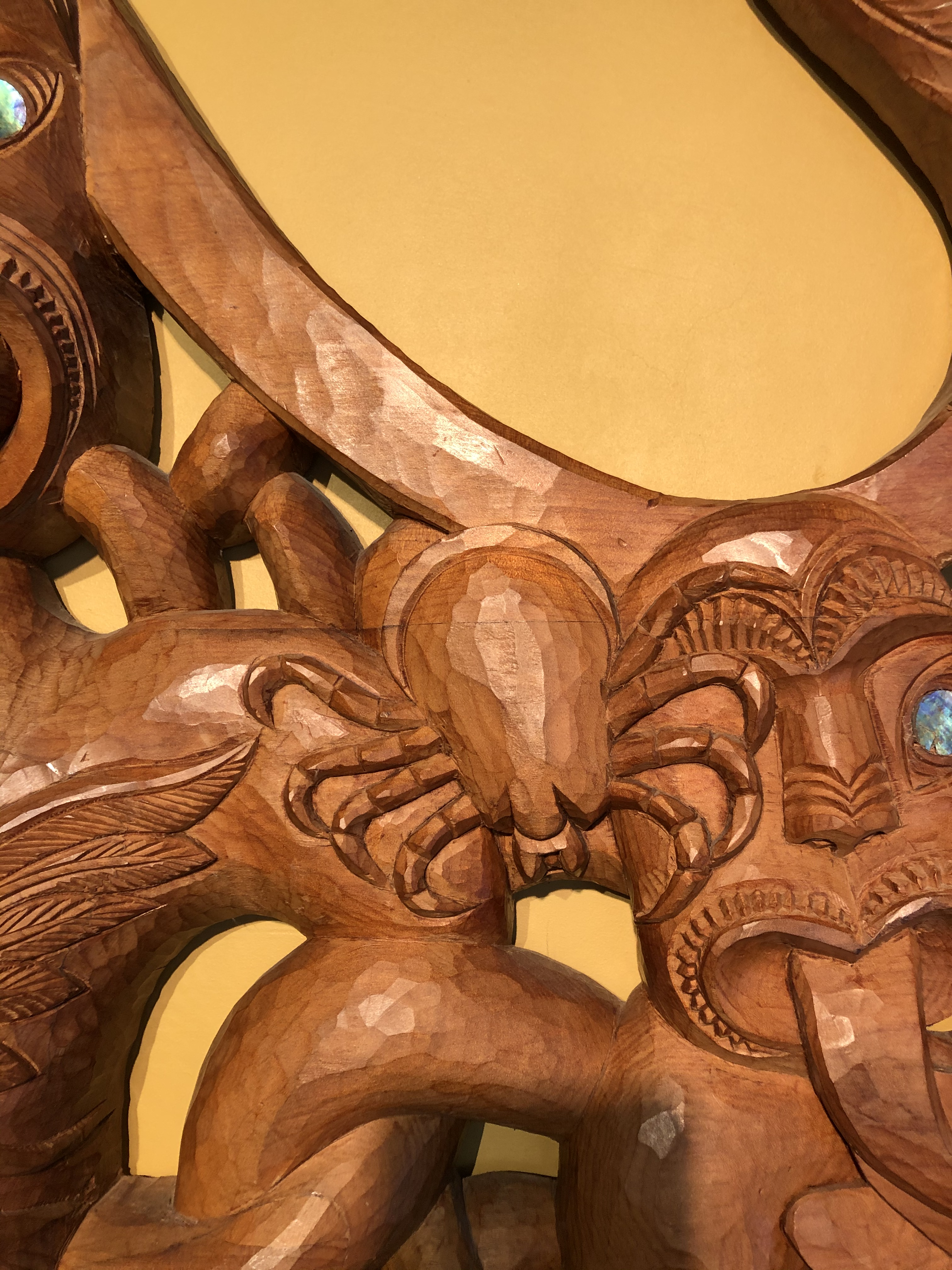
Seabird tick carved on pare on display at the New Zealand Arthropod Collection at Landcare Research, Auckland

In association with Macquarie Island penguins the tick was shown in 2009 to harbor five arboviruses: Gadgets Gully virus and Precarious Point virus, both previously described, and the previously unknown Sandy Bay virus (an orbivirus), Catch-me-cave virus (a phlebovirus), and Finch Creek virus (a nairovirus).
