= Flavivirus capsid hairpin cHP =

flavivirus capsid hairpin cHP
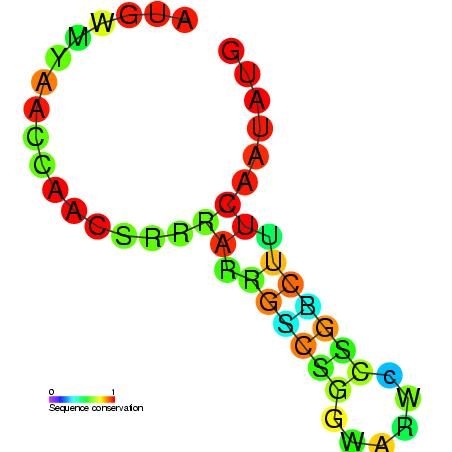
- Predicted secondary structure and sequence conservation of cHP

Identifiers
- Symbol: cHP
- Rfam: RF00617

Other data
- RNA type: Cis-reg
- Domain(s): Viruses
- SO: SO:0000233
- PDB structures: PDBe

The Flavivirus capsid hairpin cHP is a conserved RNA hairpin structure identified within the capsid coding region of several flavivirus genomes. These positive strand RNA genomes are translated as a single polypeptide and subsequently cleaved into constituent proteins, the first of which is the capsid protein. The cHP hairpin is located within the capsid coding region between two AUG start codons. The cHP cis element has been shown to direct translation start from the suboptimal first start codon. The ability of cHP to direct initiation from the first start codon is proportional to its thermodynamic stability, is position dependent, and is sequence independent. It has been demonstrated that both AUGs and the conserved cHP are necessary for efficient viral replication in human and mosquito cells.
