= Royal Farm virus =

Virus classification
- (unranked): Virus
- Realm: Riboviria
- Kingdom: Orthornavirae
- Phylum: Kitrinoviricota
- Class: Flasuviricetes
- Order: Amarillovirales
- Family: Flaviviridae
- Genus: Orthoflavivirus
- Subgenus: Euflavivirus
- Species: Orthoflavivirus royalense

Synonyms
- Karshi virus

Species of virus

Royal Farm virus, previously known as Karshi virus, was not viewed as pathogenic or harmful to humans. Although infected people suffer with fever-like symptoms, some people in Uzbekistan have reported with severe disease such as encephalitis and other large outbreaks of fever illness connected infection with the virus.

The transmission cycle of members of the M-TBFV complex involves ixodid ticks and rodents. Not enough information about the development of the virus in rodent hosts is available, so many researchers have had to infect mice by needle or by allowing an infected tick to feed on them. Ticks exposed to Royal Farm virus remained efficient carriers even when tested about 8 years after their initial exposure. Because of this insight, these ticks may serve as a long-term maintenance mechanism for Royal Farm virus Earlier studies suggest that the infection of a two-day-old white experimental mice with the virus results in deaths occurring 8–12 days after infection. Nine-day-old mice rarely die with similar exposure.

== Classification ==
More than 38 viral species are transmitted by ticks. Virus-to-tick host relationships are very specific and less than 10% of all tick species (Argasidae and Ixodidae) are known to be carriers of arboviruses. Tick-borne viruses are found in six different virus families (Asfarviridae, Reoviridae, Rhabdoviridae, Orthomyxoviridae, Bunyaviridae, Flaviviridae). Tick-borne flaviviruses are among the most important viruses in the world, primarily Europe and Asia. Tick-borne encephalitis causes between 10,000 and 15,000 human cases every year in Europe and Asia. Most of these viruses are needed for veterinary medicine. Several other tick-borne flaviviruses have not been known to cause human nor animal diseases, and their potential pathogenicity for humans and animals is unknown/unavailable. Alterations in human behavior, land use, or climate may change the actual geographical distribution and transmission intensity so that tick-borne flaviviruses are potentially relevant of the environment and may increase in medical importance.

== Historic findings ==
Isolation of this virus was tested via electron microscopy and testing on mice. Royal Farm virus has a one-way antigenic relationship with West Nile virus. A similar relationship with West Nile virus has been shown in Usutu virus isolated from Coquillettidia aurites in Uganda. However, this is a reverse type of relationship as compared with that between Royal Farm and West Nile viruses. It cannot be excluded that Royal Farm virus appeared due to antigenic drift in a genetically isolated population of West Nile virus.

== Replication ==
Certain species of mosquitoes and ticks were examined for their likelihood of transmitting Royal Farm and Langat (tick-borne encephalitis virus complex) viruses in the laboratory. It was found that there is no proof of replication of Karshi virus in the mosquito species that were tested, however, Karshi virus replication was seen in three species of Ornithodoros ticks tested. When injected with Royal Farm virus, 90% of Ornithodoros ticks (44/49) transmitted this virus by bite to suckling mice, and transmission continued to occur for at least 1 year
