= Louping ill =

Animal disease

- Other names: Ovine encephalomyelitis, infectious encephalomyelitis of sheep, trembling-ill
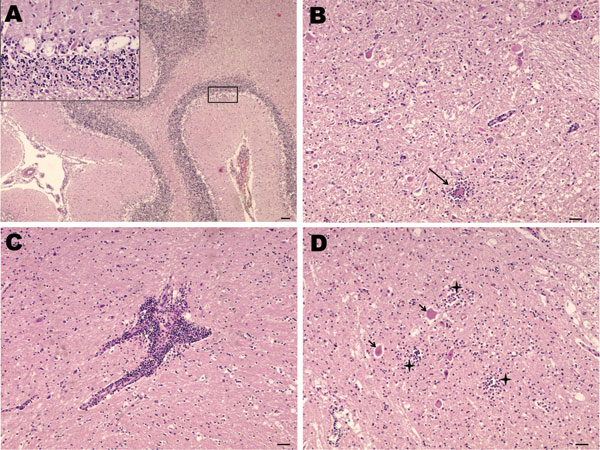
- Nonsuppurative encephalitis in goat affected by louping ill. A) Cerebellum with necrosis of Purkinje cells. Hematoxylin and eosin (H&E) stain; scale bar = 100 µm. Inset: necrosis of Purkinje cells. H&E stain; scale bar = 20 µm. B) Midbrain. Area of neurophagia (arrow) surrounded by microglial cells. Necrosis of neurons can also be seen. H&E stain; scale bar = 50 µm. C) Lymphoid perivascular cuff in midbrain. H&E stain; scale bar = 50 µm. D) Spinal cord, gray matter. Focal microgliosis (crosses) and neurons undergoing necrosis (arrows). H&E stain; scale bar = 50 µm.
- Specialty: Veterinary medicine

Louping ill (/ˈlaʊpɪŋɪl/) is an acute viral disease primarily of sheep that is characterized by a biphasic fever, depression, ataxia, muscular incoordination, tremors, posterior paralysis, coma, and death. Louping ill is a tick-transmitted disease whose occurrence is closely related to the distribution of the primary vector, the sheep tick Ixodes ricinus. It also causes disease in red grouse, and can affect humans. The name 'louping ill' is derived from an old Scottish word describing the effect of the disease in sheep whereby they 'loup' or spring into the air.

== Cause ==
Louping ill virus

Virus classification
- (unranked): Virus
- Realm: Riboviria
- Kingdom: Orthornavirae
- Phylum: Kitrinoviricota
- Class: Flasuviricetes
- Order: Amarillovirales
- Family: Flaviviridae
- Genus: Orthoflavivirus
- Subgenus: Euflavivirus
- Species: Orthoflavivirus loupingi

Louping ill is caused by RNA virus called Louping ill virus. Louping ill virus belongs to genus Orthoflavivirus, family Flaviviridae.

== Prevention ==
According to a ProMED article, disease in sheep has been controlled in the UK by a vaccine (ATCvet code: QI04AA01), originally developed by Scotland's Moredun Research Institute by Prof John Russell Greig. In 2009 a shortage of vaccine combined with an increase in the number of ticks found in sheep pasture areas cause an increased risk of this disease. The vaccine was withdrawn by its producer in 2017. In 2025, Moredun announced a crowd-funding campaign to develop a new vaccine; with the Scottish Government pledging to match funding up to £100,000 vaccine production was scaled-up to commercial levels.

== Louping ill in humans ==
Although predominantly a sheep disease, Louping ill infections have also been reported in humans, and hence is a zoonotic disease. The first reported human case of louping ill occurred in 1934. The clinical symptoms in humans include influenza-like illness (fever, headache, and muscle stiffness), biphasic encephalitis (initial flu-like symptoms followed by neurological signs such as severe headache, vomiting, and neck stiffness), poliomyelitis-like illness (paralysis ranging from mild to severe), and in rare cases hemorrhagic fever. Certain groups are at higher risk of infection due to occupational exposure. These include laboratory personnel working with the virus, farmers, shepherds, or butchers handling infected sheep or animal tissues, as well as individuals exposed to tick bites in endemic areas.
