= Amarillovirales =

Virus classification
- (unranked): Virus
- Realm: Riboviria
- Kingdom: Orthornavirae
- Phylum: Kitrinoviricota
- Class: Flasuviricetes
- Order: Amarillovirales

Order of viruses

Amarillovirales is an order of viruses. The order has three families:

- Flaviviridae
- Hepaciviridae
- Pestiviridae
