= List of reverse zoonotic diseases =

This is a list of reverse zoonotic diseases, infectious diseases that have been reported to jump from a human to a non-human animal.

Causative pathogen key
| Virus | Bacteria | Parasite | Fungi |
| Virus | Bacteria | Parasite | Fungi |

| | Disease | Pathogens | Animals affected | Mode of transmission | Transmission occurrences |
|---|---|---|---|---|---|
| Parasite | African trypanosomiasis (African sleeping sickness) | Trypanosoma brucei rhodesiense | wildlife, livestock | bite of the tsetse fly | Natural transmission cycle in African trypanosomiasis-endemic areas. |
| Virus | Avian influenza | Influenza A virus subtype H1N1 | livestock, companion animals, wildlife | direct contact, fomites, oral route, aerosols, inoculation | Livestock farms, households, veterinary hospitals, slaughterhouse, veterinary laboratories in Argentina, Australia, Canada, Chile, China, Finland, France, Germany, Hong Kong, Iceland, Indonesia, Ireland, Italy, Japan, Mexico, Norway, Russia, Singapore, South Korea, Thailand, United Kingdom, United States, Vietnam. |
| Virus | COVID-19 (Coronavirus disease 2019) | Severe acute respiratory syndrome coronavirus 2 | companion animals, ferrets, livestock | aerosols, inoculation | Susceptibility studies in the Netherlands and China. |
| Virus | Dengue fever | Dengue virus | primates | mosquito bite (primarily by Aedes aegypti and Aedes albopictus) | Natural transmission cycle in Dengue-endemic areas. |
| Parasite | Giardiasis | Giardia duodenalis | wildlife, livestock | direct contact, oral route | National parks in Uganda. Livestock farms in Canada. Wildlife in Ghana. Zoos in Australia, Namibia, Zambia. |
| Virus | Hepatitis E | Hepatitis E virus | domestic and wild animals | contaminated food or water | Wildlife and commercially sold laboratory animals in United States. |
| Virus | Human herpesvirus 1 infection | Herpes simplex virus 1 | companion animals and wildlife | direct contact, fomites, aerosols | Several reports of human to primate transmission. |
| Virus | Human herpesvirus 4 infection | Epstein–Barr virus | companion animals and wildlife | direct contact, fomites, aerosols | Several reports of human to dogs and rodents transmission. |
| Virus | Human metapneumovirus infection | Human metapneumovirus | primates | direct contact, aerosols | National Park in Tanzania. |
| Fungi | Microsporidiosis | Encephalitozoon intestinalis | wildlife | direct contact, oral route | National park in Uganda. |
| Bacteria | MRSA infection | Methicillin-resistant Staphylococcus aureus | livestock, companion animals | direct contact, fomites, oral route | Veterinary hospitals, slaughterhouses, households. |
| Virus | Norovirus infection (Norwalk virus infection, winter vomiting disease) | Norovirus | companion animals | direct contact, indirect contact via contaminated surfaces, food, or water shared between humans and animals | Households in Thailand. |
| Bacteria | ORSA infection | Oxacillin-resistant Staphylococcus aureus | livestock | unclear (evidence of human origin confirmed by phylogenetic analysis) | Livestock facility in Taiwan. |
| Bacteria | Tuberculosis | Mycobacterium bovis, Mycobacterium tuberculosis | wildlife, companion animals, livestock | direct contact, oral route, aerosols | Zoos, veterinary hospitals, slaughterhouses in South Africa, United States, India, Ethiopia. |

== See also ==
- Zoonosis
- Reverse zoonosis
- Spillover infection
- Wildlife disease
- Veterinary medicine
- Wildlife smuggling and zoonoses
- List of zoonotic primate viruses
- List of zoonotic diseases
