= List of zoonotic diseases =

This is a list of zoonotic diseases, infectious diseases that have been reported of jumping from a non-human animal to a human.

== List ==
Causative pathogen keys

Virus	Bacteria	Parasite	Fungi	Prion
Virus	Bacteria	Parasite	Fungi	Prion

	Disease	Pathogens	Animals involved	Mode of transmission	Emergence
Parasite	African trypanosomiasis (African sleeping sickness)	Trypanosoma brucei rhodesiense	range of wild animals and domestic livestock	bite of the tsetse fly	'Present in Africa for thousands of years' – major outbreak 1900–1920, cases continue (sub-Saharan Africa, 2020).
Parasite	Angiostrongyliasis	Angiostrongylus cantonensis, Angiostrongylus costaricensis	rats, cotton rats	consuming raw or undercooked snails, slugs, other mollusks, crustaceans, contaminated water, and unwashed vegetables contaminated with larvae	
Parasite	Anisakiasis	Anisakis	whales, dolphins, seals, sea lions, other marine animals	eating raw or undercooked fish and squid contaminated with eggs	
Bacteria	Anthrax	Bacillus anthracis	grazing herbivores such as cattle, sheep, goats, camels, horses, and pigs	by ingestion, inhalation or skin contact of spores	Known for at least 2000 years, but only first described clinically in 1752. Causative agent identified in 1877.
Parasite	Ascariasis	Ascaris suum, Toxocara canis, Toxocara cati	pigs, dogs, cats	ingestion of eggs from contaminated soil, food, or water	
Fungi	Aspergillosis	Aspergillus spp.	birds	inhalation of spores from soil and contaminated surfaces, contact with infected birds	First identified in 1847.
Virus	Avian influenza	Influenza A virus subtype H5N1	wild birds, domesticated birds such as chickens	close contact	2003–present avian influenza in Southeast Asia and Egypt.
Parasite	Babesiosis	Babesia spp.	mice, other animals	tick bite	
Parasite	Balantidiasis	Balantidium coli	pigs (primary reservoir), other mammals (e.g., camels, cattle, sheep), rarely non-human primates	fecal-oral transmission via ingestion of cysts in contaminated food or water, direct contact with pig feces, mechanical transmission possible via flies and cockroaches	
Virus	Batai virus infection	Batai orthobunyavirus	birds, livestock	mosquito bite	
Parasite	Baylisascariasis	Baylisascaris procyonis	raccoons	ingestion of eggs in feces	
Virus	Barmah Forest fever	Barmah Forest virus	kangaroos, wallabies, possums	mosquito bite	First human case reported in 1986.
Bacteria	Botulism	Clostridium botulinum	birds, mammals	ingestion of contaminated food, wound infection, or intestinal colonization	
Prion	Bovine spongiform encephalopathy (mad cow disease)	Prions	cattle	eating infected meat	Isolated similar cases reported in ancient history; in recent UK history probable start in the 1970s.
Bacteria	Brucellosis (undulant fever, Malta fever, Mediterranean fever)	Brucella spp.	cattle, goats, pigs, sheep	infected milk or meat	Historically widespread in the Mediterranean region; identified in the early 20th century.
Bacteria	Bubonic plague, Pneumonic plague, Septicemic plague, Sylvatic plague	Yersinia pestis	rabbits, hares, rodents, ferrets, goats, sheep, camels	flea bite	Epidemics like Black Death in Europe around 1347–53 during the Late Middle Age; third plague pandemic in China-Qing dynasty and India alone.
Virus	California encephalitis	California encephalitis virus	small mammals	mosquito bite (Aedes species)	First identified in 1943 in Kern County, California.
Bacteria	Campylobacteriosis	Campylobacter spp.	poultry, cattle, pets (dogs and cats)	consumption of contaminated food or water, direct contact with infected animals	
Parasite	Capillariasis	Capillaria spp.	rodents, birds, foxes	eating raw or undercooked fish, ingesting embryonated eggs in fecal-contaminated food, water, or soil	
Bacteria	Capnocytophaga canimorsus infection	Capnocytophaga canimorsus	dogs, cats	bites, scratches, or close contact with animals	
Bacteria	Cat-scratch disease	Bartonella henselae	cats	bites or scratches from infected cats	
Parasite	Chagas disease (American trypanosomiasis)	Trypanosoma cruzi	armadillos, Triatominae (kissing bug)	contact of mucosae or wounds with feces of kissing bugs, accidental ingestion of parasites in food contaminated by bugs or infected mammal excretae	
Virus	Chikungunya	Alphavirus chikungunya	primates, small mammals, rodents, birds, mosquitoes	mosquito bite (Aedes aegypti, Aedes albopictus)	First identified in 1952 in Tanzania.
Bacteria	Clamydiosis / Enzootic abortion	Chlamydophila abortus	domestic livestock, particularly sheep	close contact with postpartum ewes	
Bacteria	Clostridioides difficile infection (Clostridium difficile infection)	Clostridioides difficile	cattle, companion animals	fecal-oral route, contact with contaminated surfaces or hands	
Virus	Colorado tick fever	Colorado tick fever virus	small rodents	tick bite (primarily by Dermacentor andersoni, the Rocky Mountain wood tick)	
Virus	COVID-19 (Coronavirus disease 2019)	Severe acute respiratory syndrome coronavirus 2	bats, felines, raccoon dogs, minks, white-tailed deer	respiratory transmission	2019–2023 COVID-19 pandemic;
Virus	Cowpox	Cowpox virus	rodents, cattle, cats	direct contact with infected animals	
Prion	Creutzfeldt-Jacob disease	PrP^{vCJD}	cattle	eating meat from animals with Bovine spongiform encephalopathy (BSE)	1996–2001: United Kingdom.
Virus	Crimean–Congo hemorrhagic fever	Crimean-Congo hemorrhagic fever orthonairovirus	cattle, goats, sheep, birds, hares	tick bite (Hyalomma spp.), human-to-human contact via bodily fluids	
Fungi	Cryptococcosis	Cryptococcus neoformans	birds like pigeons	inhaling fungi	
Parasite	Cryptosporidiosis	Cryptosporidium spp.	cattle, dogs, cats, mice, pigs, horses, deer, sheep, goats, rabbits, leopard geckos, birds	ingesting cysts from water contaminated with feces	
Parasite	Cysticercosis and taeniasis	Taenia solium, Taenia asiatica, Taenia saginata	pigs and cattle	consuming water, soil or food contaminated with the tapeworm eggs (cysticercosis) or raw or undercooked pork contaminated with the cysticerci (taeniasis)	
Virus	Dengue fever	Dengue virus	primates	mosquito bite (primarily by Aedes aegypti and Aedes albopictus)	The earliest detailed descriptions of dengue-like illness appeared in medical records from 1779 to 1780, but has had a significant re-emergence in recent years (see for example 2019–20 dengue fever epidemic).
Fungi	Dermatophytosis (tinea, ringworm)	Microsporum spp., Trichophyton spp.	cattle, sheep, goats, cats, dogs	contact with infected individuals or animals, contact with contaminated surfaces (fomites) or soil	Know by ancient Romans, but only fully described in 1837.
Parasite	Dirofilariasis	Dirofilaria spp.	dogs, wolves, coyotes, foxes, jackals, cats, monkeys, raccoons, bears, muskrats, rabbits, leopards, seals, sea lions, beavers, ferrets, reptiles	mosquito bite	
Virus	Dhori virus infection	Dhori virus	birds, livestock, mammals	tick bite	
Virus	Dobrava-Belgrade virus infection	Dobrava-Belgrade virus	rodents (e.g., yellow-necked mouse)	rodent bite and scratches, inhalation of aerosolized particles from rodent droppings, urine, or nesting materials	
Parasite	Dracunculiasis	Dracunculus medinensis	dogs, cats, baboons	mainly contaminated water	Known by ancient Egyptians, but only fully identified in 1870.
Virus	Eastern equine encephalitis	Eastern equine encephalitis virus	horses, birds, cattle	mosquito bite	
Virus	Ebola	Ebolavirus spp.	chimpanzees, gorillas, orangutans, fruit bats, monkeys, shrews, forest antelope and porcupines	through body fluids and organs	2013–16; possibly in Africa.
Parasite	Echinococcosis	Echinococcus spp.	dogs, foxes, jackals, wolves, coyotes, sheep, pigs, rodents	ingestion of infective eggs from contaminated food or water with feces of an infected definitive host	
Bacteria	Enterohaemorrhagic Escherichia coli infection	Shigatoxigenic and verotoxigenic Escherichia coli	cattle, sheep, goats, deer	ingestion of contaminated food or water, direct contact with infected animals or their feces	
Bacteria	Erysipeloid	Erysipelothrix rhusiopathiae	pigs, fish, birds	direct contact with infected animals or contaminated animal products	
Parasite	Fasciolosis	Fasciola hepatica, Fasciola gigantica	sheep, cattle, buffaloes	ingesting contaminated plants	
Parasite	Fasciolopsiasis	Fasciolopsis buski	pigs	eating raw vegetables such as water spinach	
Bacteria	Foodborne illnesses (commonly diarrheal diseases)	Escherichia coli, Salmonella spp., Listeria spp., Shigella spp.	animals domesticated for food production (cattle, poultry)	raw or undercooked food made from animals and unwashed vegetables contaminated with feces	
Parasite	Giardiasis	Giardia duodenalis	beavers, other rodents, raccoons, deer, cattle, goats, sheep, dogs, cats	ingesting spores and cysts in food and water contaminated with feces	
Bacteria	Glanders	Burkholderia mallei.	horses, donkeys	direct contact	
Parasite	Gnathostomiasis (larva migrans profundus)	Gnathostoma spp.	fish, amphibians	consuming raw or under-cooked fish or meat	
Virus	Hantavirus	Hantavirus spp.	deer mice, cotton rats and other rodents	exposure to feces, urine, saliva or bodily fluids	
Virus	Henipavirus	Henipavirus spp.	horses, bats	exposure to feces, urine, saliva or contact with sick horses	
Virus	Hepatitis E	Hepatitis E virus	domestic and wild animals	contaminated food or water	
Fungi	Histoplasmosis	Histoplasma capsulatum	birds, bats	inhaling fungi in guano	
Virus	HIV infection	Simian immunodeficiency virus	primates	contact with infected blood and other bodily fluids, mother-to-infant during pregnancy, childbirth, and breastfeeding	Immunodeficiency resembling human AIDS was reported in captive monkeys in the United States beginning in 1983. SIV was isolated in 1985 from some of these animals, captive rhesus macaques who had simian AIDS (SAIDS). The discovery of SIV was made shortly after HIV-1 had been isolated as the cause of AIDS and led to the discovery of HIV-2 strains in West Africa. HIV-2 was more similar to the then-known SIV strains than to HIV-1, suggesting for the first time the simian origin of HIV. Further studies indicated that HIV-2 is derived from the SIVsmm strain found in sooty mangabeys, whereas HIV-1, the predominant virus found in humans, is derived from SIV strains infecting chimpanzees (SIVcpz).
Bacteria	Human granulocytic anaplasmosis	Anaplasma phagocytophilum	deer, rodents, humans	tick bite (primarily by Ixodes scapularis and Ixodes pacificus)	
Bacteria	Human monocytotropic ehrlichiosis	Ehrlichia chaffeensis	deer	tick bite (primarily by Amblyomma americanum, the lone star tick)	
Virus	Japanese encephalitis	Japanese encephalitis virus	pigs, water birds	mosquito bite	
Virus	Kyasanur Forest disease	Kyasanur Forest disease virus	rodents, shrews, bats, monkeys	tick bite	
Virus	La Crosse encephalitis	La Crosse virus	chipmunks, tree squirrels	mosquito bite	
Virus	Lassa fever	Lassa mammarenavirus	rodents	contact with urine, feces, or bodily fluids of infected rats; human-to-human transmission via bodily fluids	
Parasite	Leishmaniasis	Leishmania spp.	dogs, rodents, other animals	sandfly bite	2004 Afghanistan.
Bacteria	Leprosy (Hansen's disease)	Mycobacterium leprae, Mycobacterium lepromatosis	armadillos, monkeys, rabbits, mice	mostly human-to-human direct contact, meat consumption	
Bacteria	Leptospirosis	Leptospira interrogans	rats, mice, pigs, horses, goats, sheep, cattle, buffaloes, opossums, raccoons, mongooses, foxes, dogs	direct or indirect contact with urine of infected animals	1616–20 New England infection; present day in the United States.
Virus	Louping ill	Louping ill virus	sheep, red grouse, other mammals	tick bite (primarily by Ixodes ricinus)	First human case reported in 1934.
Bacteria	Lyme disease (Lyme borreliosis)	Borrelia burgdorferi	deer, wolves, dogs, birds, rodents, rabbits, hares, reptiles	tick bite	
Virus	Lymphocytic choriomeningitis	Lymphocytic choriomeningitis virus	rodents	exposure to urine, feces, or saliva	
Virus	Marburg virus disease (Marburg viral haemorrhagic fever)	Marburg virus	Egyptian fruit bats (Rousettus aegyptiacus), primates	contact with infected bat excreta, bushmeat consumption, or human-to-human transmission via bodily fluids (e.g., blood, saliva, vomit)	
Bacteria	Mediterranean spotted fever (Boutonneuse fever, Kenya tick typhus, Indian tick typhus, Marseilles fever, Astrakhan fever)	Rickettsia conorii	dogs, rodents, other mammals	tick bite	
Bacteria	Melioidosis	Burkholderia pseudomallei	various animals	direct contact with contaminated soil and surface water	
Fungi	Microsporidiosis	Encephalitozoon cuniculi	rabbits, dogs, mice, and other mammals	ingestion of spores	
Virus	Middle East respiratory syndrome	MERS coronavirus	bats, camels	close contact	2012–present: Saudi Arabia.
Virus	Mpox	Monkeypox virus	rodents, primates	contact with infected rodents, primates, or contaminated materials	
Bacteria	MRSA infection	Methicillin-resistant Staphylococcus aureus	livestock, companion animals	direct contact with infected individuals or contaminated surfaces	
Virus	Nipah virus infection	Nipah virus (NiV)	bats, pigs	direct contact with infected bats, infected pigs	
Virus	O'nyong'nyong fever	O'nyong'nyong virus	reservoir hosts unknown	mosquito bite (Anopheles funestus, Anopheles gambiae)	First identified in 1959 in Uganda.
Virus	Orf	Orf virus	goats, sheep	close contact	
Bacteria	Pasteurellosis	Pasteurella multocida	domestic cats, dogs, livestock, and wild animals	bites, scratches, inhalation of aerosols, or contact with infected secretions	
Virus	Powassan encephalitis	Powassan virus	ticks	tick bites	
Bacteria	Psittacosis (parrot fever)	Chlamydophila psittaci	macaws, cockatiels, budgerigars, pigeons, sparrows, ducks, hens, gulls and many other bird species	contact with bird droplets	
Virus	Puumala virus infection	Puumala virus	bank voles (Clethrionomys glareolus)	rodent bite or scratches, inhalation of aerosols containing rodent excreta	
Bacteria	Q fever (query fever)	Coxiella burnetii	livestock and other domestic animals such as dogs and cats	inhalation of spores, contact with bodily fluid or feces	
Virus	Rabies	Rabies lyssavirus	dogs, bats, monkeys, raccoons, foxes, skunks, cattle, goats, sheep, wolves, coyotes, groundhogs, horses, mongooses and cats	through saliva by biting, or through scratches from an infected animal	Variety of places like Oceania, South America, Europe.
Bacteria	Rat-bite fever	Streptobacillus moniliformis, Spirillum minus	rats, mice	rat bite of rats, contact with urine and mucus secretions	
Virus	Rift Valley fever	Phlebovirus	livestock, buffaloes, camels	mosquito bite, contact with bodily fluids, blood, tissues, breathing around butchered animals or raw milk	2006–07 East Africa outbreak.
Virus	Rocio viral encephalitis	Rocio virus	birds	mosquito bite	
Bacteria	Rocky Mountain spotted fever	Rickettsia rickettsii	dogs, rodents	tick bite	
Virus	Ross River fever	Ross River virus	kangaroos, wallabies, horses, opossums, birds, flying foxes	mosquito bite	
Virus	Saint Louis encephalitis	Saint Louis encephalitis virus	birds	mosquito bite	
Virus	Seoul virus infection	Seoul virus	rodents	contact with infected rodent saliva, feces, urine, or bites	
Virus	Severe acute respiratory syndrome	SARS coronavirus	bats, civets	close contact, respiratory droplets	2002–04 SARS outbreak; China.
Virus	Sindbis fever	Sindbis virus	birds	mosquito bite	
Virus	Smallpox	Variola virus	possibly monkeys and horses	spread from person to person quickly	Last reported case in 1977; certified by WHO to be eradicated (i.e., eliminated worldwide) as of 1980.
Bacteria	Streptococcosis	Streptococcus suis	pigs	direct contact with infected pigs or pork products, especially through cuts or abrasions, or inhalation of contaminated aerosols	
Virus	Swine influenza	Swine influenza virus	pigs	close contact	2009–10; 2009 swine flu pandemic; Mexico.
Parasite	Taenia crassiceps infection	Taenia crassiceps	wolves, coyotes, jackals, foxes	contact with soil contaminated with feces	
Virus	Tick-borne encephalitis	Tick-borne encephalitis virus	birds, rodents, horses	tick bite (primarily by Ixodes ricinus)	
Virus	Thogotovirus infection	Thogotovirus	livestock, humans	tick bite	
Parasite	Toxocariasis	Toxocara spp.	dogs, foxes, cats	ingestion of eggs in soil, fresh or unwashed vegetables or undercooked meat	
Parasite	Toxoplasmosis	Toxoplasma gondii	cats, livestock, poultry, rodents	exposure to cat feces, organ transplantation, blood transfusion, contaminated soil, water, grass, unwashed vegetables, unpasteurized dairy products and undercooked meat	First identified in 1908 in a gundi in Tunisia and a rabbit in Brazil.
Parasite	Trichinosis (trichinellosis)	Trichinella spp.	rodents, pigs, horses, bears, walruses, dogs, foxes, crocodiles, birds	eating undercooked meat	
Bacteria	Tuberculosis (white death, consumption)	Mycobacterium bovis	infected cattle, deer, llamas, pigs, domestic cats, wild carnivores (foxes, coyotes) and omnivores (possums, mustelids and rodents)	milk, exhaled air, sputum, urine, feces and pus from infected animals	
Bacteria	Tularemia (rabbit fever)	Francisella tularensis	lagomorphs (type A), rodents (type B), birds	ticks, deer flies, and other insects including mosquitoes	
Virus	Valtice fever (Ťahyňa virus virus infection)	Bunyavirus	rodents	mosquito bite	
Virus	Venezuelan equine encephalitis	Venezuelan equine encephalitis virus	horses, donkeys, zebras, birds, rodents	mosquito bite	
Virus	Wesselsbron disease	Wesselsbron virus	sheep, cattle	mosquito bite	
Virus	West Nile fever	West Nile virus	birds, horses, primates, dogs, cats, and incidentally reptiles and amphibians	mosquito bite	First identified in 1937 in the West Nile sub-region of Uganda. Later emerged in the Western Hemisphere in 1999 during an outbreak in New York.
Virus	Western equine encephalitis	Western equine encephalitis virus	horses, birds	mosquito bite	
Bacteria	Yersiniosis	Yersinia enterocolitica	pigs, rodents, cattle	ingestion of contaminated food or water	
Virus	Zika fever	Zika virus	chimpanzees, gorillas, orangutans, monkeys, baboons	mosquito bite, sexual intercourse, blood transfusion and sometimes bites of monkeys	2015–16 epidemic in the Americas and Oceania.

== See also ==
- Zoonosis
- Reverse zoonosis
- Spillover infection
- Wildlife disease
- Veterinary medicine
- Wildlife smuggling and zoonoses
- List of zoonotic primate viruses
- List of reverse zoonotic diseases
