= Rodentology =

Scientific study of rodents

Rodentology is a branch of mammalogy for the study of rodents by a rodentologist. The scientific group of rodents would include, but is not limited to, mice, rats, squirrels, etc. From the perspective of zoology, it investigates the behaviour, biology and classification of various rodent species. The study of rodents includes their genetics and their place in the ecosystem. Furthermore, research may be conducted into pest control, disease vector, disease management in agriculture, environmental degradation, globalization and disease, effects on human society and pathogen transmission.

== Benefits to society ==
Rodentology may benefit human society with contributions to agriculture, balance of nature, food protection, global health, human health, infrastructure protection, integrated pest management, public health and scientific research.
