= Spillover infection =

Transmission of a pathogen into a new host species

Spillover infections occur when a pathogen is transmitted from their natural reservoir or another host species into a new host species. In zoonotic spillover, the pathogen is transmitted from an animal to a human. Spillover may occur through direct contact with infected animals, exposure to contaminated surroundings or vectors. Whether a pathogen establishes an infection in the new host depends on factors like exposure, host susceptibility and compatibility between the pathogen and the host's biological systems.Spillover does not necessarily result in sustained transmission among the new host population; some introductions end in isolated infections, while others may lead to further transmission and in certain circumstances outbreaks and epidemics. Due to climate change and land use expansion, the risk of viral spillover is predicted to significantly increase.

== Mechanisms of spillover ==
Spillover is a complex process in which a pathogen is transmitted from one host species to another and establishes an infection in the new recipient host. It occurs through a series of ecological, epidemiological and biological processes. These processes can be divided into stages: pathogen pressure, exposure and host susceptibility.

=== Pathogen pressure ===
It refers to the amount of infectious pathogen available to a potential recipient host at a given place and time. It is influenced by the distribution and abundance of reservoir hosts, infection prevalence, pathogen shedding and the pathogen's survival and dissemination outside the host.

=== Exposure ===
Occurs when a susceptible host encounters the pathogen through direct contact, contaminated environments or materials, or transmission by an intermediate host or vector. Host behaviour and ecological conditions influence the likelihood, route and dose of exposure. Contact between different host species may be affected by ecosystem changes, including habitat fragmentation and human encroachment into wildlife habitats, although the effects of these changes on spillover risk vary across ecological systems.

=== Host susceptibility ===
Determines whether infection becomes established. This depends on the pathogen dose, pathogen's ability to enter host cells, route of entry, replicate and evade or withstand host immune defences as well as the recipient host's genetic and physiological characteristics.

The result of spillover ranges from infections that do not lead to further transmission to sustained transmission that may result in outbreaks or epidemics, depending on pathogen characteristics, host susceptibility and epidemiological conditions.

=== Bats as reservoir hosts ===
Bats are often studied as one of the most common mammalian reservoir hosts. Bats are reservoirs for viruses from all seven Baltimore classifications, and coronaviruses makes up the largest number of the share. Other viruses that are associated with bats include Marburg virus, Rabies virus, SARS-CoV-1, and Nipha virus.

Many debate whether bats are that common of a reservoir host, but a 205 review illustrated that bats, rodents, and even primates were host to many zoonotic viruses than all other mammals and the viruses were all found to be similar. Another study conducted in 2020 showed that no mammal group was known to carry more viruses that can infect humans, rather group of mammals that had more species were likely to harbor more zoonotic viruses. This same study notes possible bias that more research was done on bat viruses than other mammalian groups that may be reservoir hosts.

The common transmission route from bats to humans is from the bodily fluids of bats to an intermediate host, through the environment or via blood sucking insects. Viruses such as the Lyssaviruses are commonly transmitted via a bite, but most of these other bat viruses are not transmitted that way. Contact with infected urine or salvia is a primary method of viral transmittance. Additionally, researchers have found that livestock serve as intermediate hosts in countries such as Malaysia and Australia. Researchers also found that Nipha virus in Bangladesh was transmitted through consuming raw date palm sap, which was contaminated likely by an intermediate host such as a fox.

== Examples of spillover infections ==
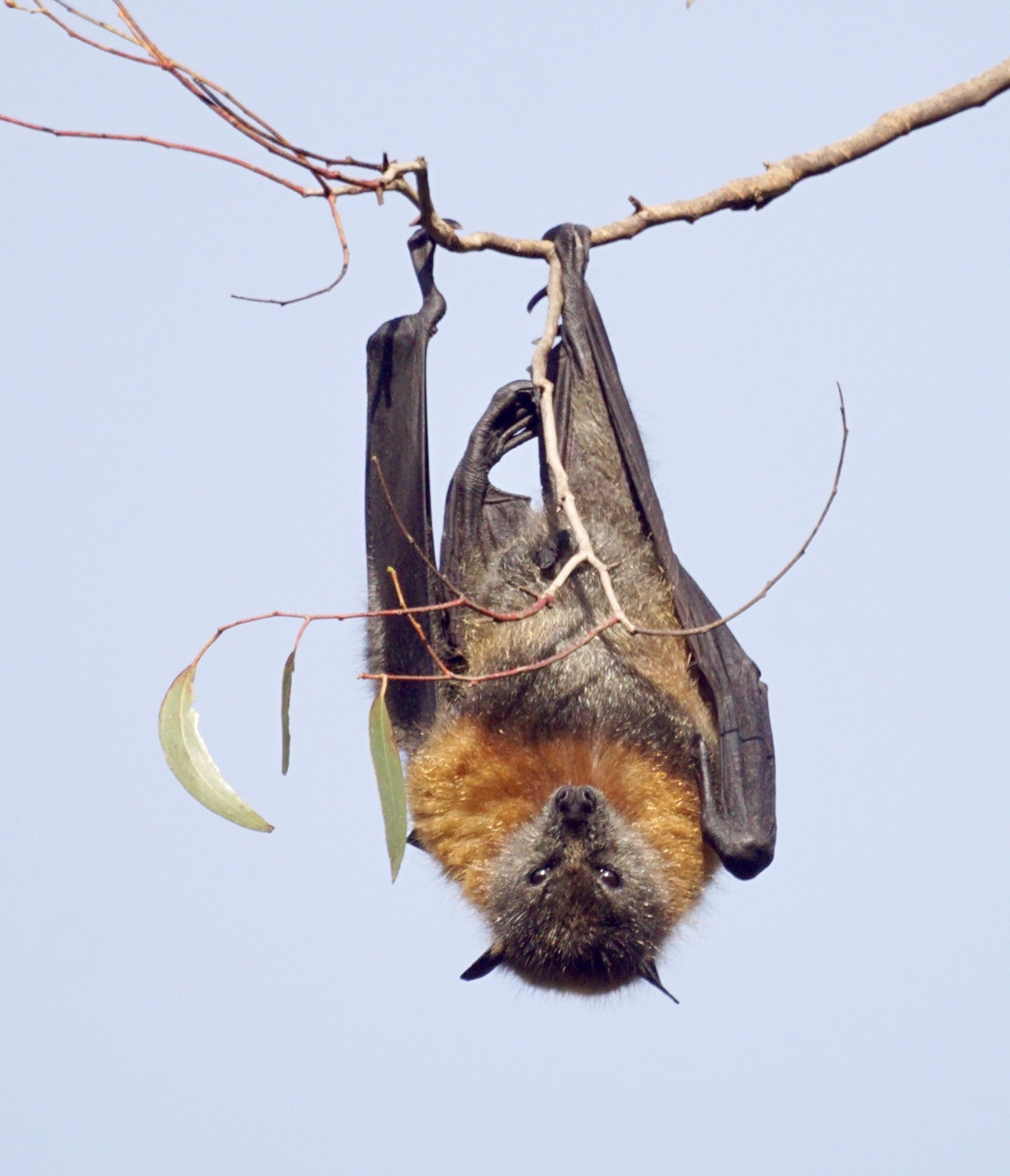
The fruit bat is believed to be the zoonotic agent responsible for the spillover of the Ebola virus.

Spillover is a common event; in fact, more than two-thirds of human viruses are zoonotic. Documented spillover infections affect humans through transmission of viruses, bacteria, parasites and fungi from animals or animal-associated environments.

Most spillover events result in self-limited cases with no further human-to-human transmission, as occurs, for example, with rabies, anthrax, histoplasmosis or hydatidosis. Other zoonotic pathogens are able to be transmitted by humans to produce secondary cases and even to establish limited chains of transmission. Some examples are the Ebola and Marburg filoviruses, the MERS and SARS coronaviruses and some avian flu viruses. Some spillover events can result in the final adaptation of the microbe from animals to humans, who become a new stable reservoir, as occurred with the HIV virus resulting in the AIDS epidemic and with SARS-CoV-2 resulting in the COVID-19 pandemic.

Among bacterial diseases, plague is caused by Yersinia pestis, which circulates among rodents and their fleas can infect humans through flea bites or contact with infected animal tissues. Leptospirosis, caused by bacteria of genus Leptospira, can be acquired through contact with urine of infected animals or urine contaminated water and soil.

Parasitic spillover by zoonotic malaria caused by Plasmodium knowlesi, a parasite in macaques and transmitted to humans by mosquitoes bites and toxoplasmosis, caused by Toxoplasma gondii, which transmits through exposure to environment contaminated with infected cat faeces which contain toxoplasma eggs or through consumption of contaminated food.

== Evolutionary factors influencing spillover ==
When host-microbe interactions last over long periods of time, they can lead to stable associations and co-evolution, and in some cases, permanent integration of microbial genetic material into human genome, as in case of endogenous viruses. The closer the two host species (reservoir and recipient) are in phylogenetic terms, the easier it is for microbes to overcome the biological barrier to produce spillovers. Other mammals are the main source of zoonotic agents for humans. For example, in the case of the Ebola virus, fruit bats are the suspected zoonotic agent.

Genetic variation and evolutionary changes in pathogens' genetic material can influence their capacity to infect new host species, though cross-species infection (spillover) does not necessarily result in infection or sustained transmission in recipient host population.

== Environmental and anthropogenic drivers for spillover ==
During the late 20th century, zoonotic spillover increased as the environmental impact of agriculture promoted increased land use and deforestation, changing wildlife habitat. As species shift their geographic range in response to climate change, the risk of zoonotic spillover is predicted to substantially increase, particularly in tropical regions that are experiencing rapid global warming. As forested areas of land are cleared for human use, there is increased proximity and interaction between wild animals and humans thereby increasing the potential for exposure.

== Intraspecies spillover ==
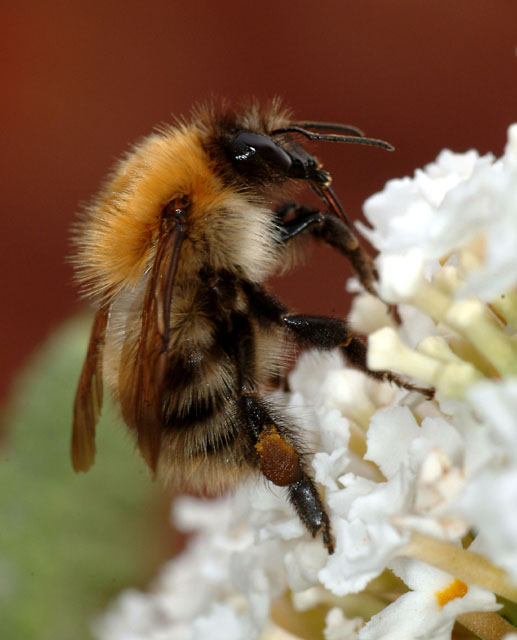
The bumblebee is a potential reservoir for several pollinator parasites.

Commercially bred bumblebees used to pollinate greenhouses can be reservoirs for several pollinator parasites including the protozoans Crithidia bombi and Apicystis bombi, the microsporidians Nosema bombi and Nosema ceranae, plus viruses such as Deformed wing virus and the tracheal mites Locustacarus buchneri. Commercial bees that escape the greenhouse environment may then infect wild bee populations. Infection may be via direct interactions between managed and wild bees or via shared flower use and contamination. One study found that half of all wild bees found near greenhouses were infected with C. bombi. Rates and incidence of infection decline dramatically the further away from the greenhouses where the wild bees are located. Instances of spillover between bumblebees are well documented across the world, particularly in Japan, North America and the United Kingdom.

Examples of Spillover Zoonosis
Disease	Reservoir
Hepatitis E	Wild Boar
Ebola	Fruit Bats
HIV/AIDS	Chimpanzee
COVID-19	Bats (Note: SARS-CoV-2 is widely believed to have an original reservoir in bats, though there may have been an intermediate host (such as palm civets, minks, or pangolins) before spillover into humans.)

== Surveillance and prevention of spillover infections ==
=== Surveillance ===
Surveillance and prevention of spillover infections involve identifying pathogens in animal reservoirs, monitoring transmission at animal-human-environment interfaces and reducing factors that help in cross-species transmssion. The One Health approach involves human, animal and environmental health surveillance, recognising that disease emergence is influenced by interactions among these systems.Surveillance can combine clinical case reporting, pathogen testing in wildlife and domestic animals, environmental sampling, genomic analysis and monitoring of ecological or human activities related with increased exposure. Surveillance of potential reservoir hosts and drivers of disease emergence help identify emerging spillover threats before they lead to large outbreaks.

=== Prevention and One Health approaches ===
Preventive measures include improving biosecurity on farms, reducing occupational exposure to infected animals, implementing appropriate animal vaccination and disease-control programmes, regulating wildlife trade, improving food safety and reducing contact with contaminated materials or surroundings.Environment management and land-use strategies may also help in reducing spillover risk. When spillover occurs, rapid diagnosis, laboratory confirmation, case reporting, contact tracing where relevant, infection prevention and control and vaccination or treatment can help limit further transmission. As spillover pathways vary among pathogens and settings, prevention strategies should be adapted to local ecological conditions, host species and routes of transmission.

Prevention of zoonotic spillover has not been a focus in global healthcare policy than when at outbreak occurs. Most of the money spent on pandemics is done so after the pathogen has infected humans, and goes towards detecting the outbreak and therapies such as medications and vaccines. Spillover often occurs as we start to expand territories to build homes or businesses and enter into areas where wild animals can interact with us. The risk of spillover is expected to rise as increased population occurs and more land use is going to be necessary. If animals become stressed and lose their home or source of food these viruses can be shed more readily by the intermediate host.

By studying how viruses can be transmitted from bats to people, researchers have proposed what is called "Ecological Countermeasures", to protect the habitats of bats, thus lowering the risk of zoonotic disease infecting people. Researchers argue that protecting and restoring the habitats of bats should be used alongside the research of medications and vaccines. One health approaches and ideas have been created to link pandemic prevention and preparation across humans, animals, and environmental health sectors.

How public health officials talk about bats carries significant meaning. Bats ultimately benefit the ecosystem they are in by pollinating plants, spreading seeds, and eating insects that may bother livestock or people. Researchers have noted that if bats are discussed in vile ways it can lead to people destroying the species, or ruining their habitats, which ultimately can increase the risk of spillover instead of what the goal is; to mitigate the risk.

== See also ==
- Epidemic
- Infection
- Outbreak
- Zoonosis
- Reverse zoonosis
- Cross-species transmission
- List of zoonotic diseases
- List of Legionellosis outbreaks
- 1993 Four Corners hantavirus outbreak
- Severe acute respiratory syndrome coronavirus 2
