= Globalization and disease =

Map of the world of verified victims of COVID-19 during the COVID-19 pandemic per capita as of 22 November 2022

Globalization, the flow of information, goods, capital, and people across political and geographic boundaries, allows infectious diseases to rapidly spread around the world, while also allowing the alleviation of factors such as hunger and poverty, which are key determinants of global health. The spread of diseases across wide geographic scales has increased through history. Early diseases that spread from Asia to Europe were bubonic plague, influenza of various types, and similar infectious diseases.

In the current era of globalization, the world is more interdependent than at any other time. Efficient and inexpensive transportation has left few places inaccessible, and increased global trade in agricultural products has brought more and more people into contact with animal diseases that have subsequently jumped species barriers (see zoonosis).

Globalization intensified during the Age of Exploration, but trading routes had long been established between Asia and Europe, along which diseases were also transmitted. An increase in travel has helped spread diseases to natives of lands who had not previously been exposed. When a native population is infected with a new disease, where they have not developed antibodies through generations of previous exposure, the new disease tends to run rampant within the population.

Etiology, the modern branch of science that deals with the causes of infectious disease, recognizes five major modes of disease transmission: airborne, waterborne, bloodborne, by direct contact, and through vector (insects or other creatures that carry germs from one species to another). As humans began traveling overseas and across lands which were previously isolated, research suggests that diseases have been spread by all five transmission modes.

== Travel patterns and globalization ==
The Age of Exploration generally refers to the period between the 15th and 17th centuries. During this time, technological advances in shipbuilding and navigation made it easier for nations to explore outside previous boundaries. Globalization has had many benefits, for example, new products to Europeans were discovered, such as tea, silk and sugar when Europeans developed new trade routes around Africa to India and the Spice Islands, Asia, and eventually running to the Americas.

In addition to trading in goods, many nations began to trade in slavery. Trading in slaves was another way by which diseases were carried to new locations and peoples, for instance, from sub-Saharan Africa to the Caribbean and the Americas. During this time, different societies began to integrate, increasing the concentration of humans and animals in certain places, which led to the emergence of new diseases as some jumped, in mutation, from animals to humans.

During this time sorcerers' and witch doctors' treatment of disease was often focused on magic and religion, and healing the entire body and soul, rather than focusing on a few symptoms, in the way modern medicine does. Early medicine often included the use of herbs and meditation. Based on archaeological evidence, some prehistoric practitioners in both Europe and South America used trephining, making a hole in the skull to release illness. Severe diseases were often thought of as supernatural or magical. The result of the introduction of Eurasian diseases to the Americas was that many more native peoples were killed by disease and germs than by the colonists' use of guns or other weapons. Scholars estimate that over a period of four centuries, epidemic diseases wiped out as much as 90 percent of the American indigenous populations.

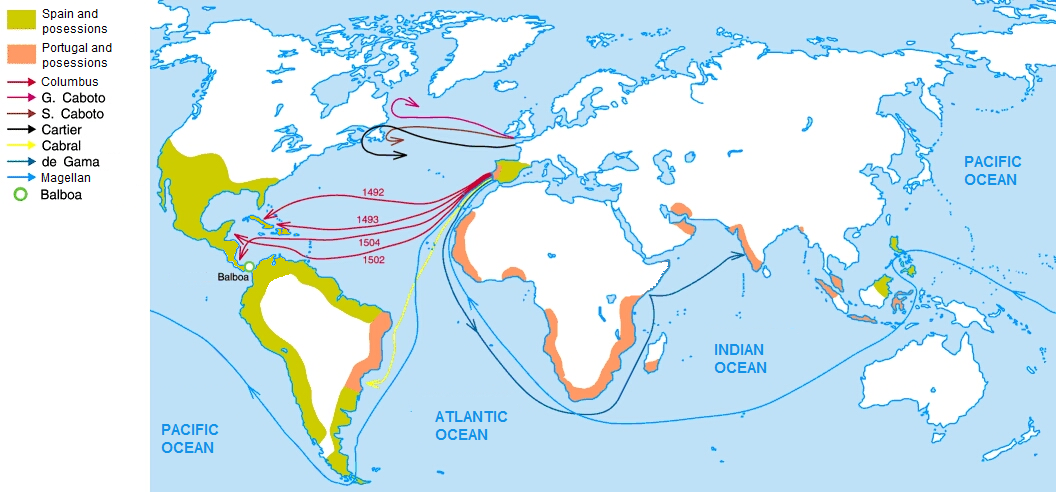
Map with the main travels of the Age of Discovery (began in 15th century)

In Europe during the age of exploration, diseases such as smallpox, measles and tuberculosis (TB) had already been introduced centuries before through trade with Asia and Africa. People had developed some antibodies to these and other diseases from the Eurasian continent. When the Europeans traveled to new lands, they carried these diseases with them. (Note: Scholars believe TB was already endemic in the Americas.) When such diseases were introduced for the first time to new populations of humans, the effects on the native populations were widespread and deadly. The Columbian Exchange, referring to Christopher Columbus's first contact with the native peoples of the Caribbean, began the trade of animals, and plants, and unwittingly began an exchange of diseases.

=== Evolution of germ theory ===
It was not until the 1800s that humans began to recognize the existence and role of germs and microbes in relation to disease. Although many historical thinkers had ideas about germs, it was not until French doctor Louis Pasteur spread his theory about germs, and the need for maintaining sanitation (particularly in medical practice), that the majority of people listened. The idea of sanitation was based on earlier research by Ignaz Semmelweis in Austria in 1847, who proved that doctors' hand washing and sterilisation with chlorine prevented clinic-based deaths of mothers, that were occurring due to infectious puerperal fever and sepsis, after childbirth. Even earlier than this, Samuel Hahnemann, the founder of homoeopathic medicine, had in the late 18th Century, developed and published sound guidelines for quarantine, washing, ventilation and other public health measures to limit the spread of disease. Later, by 1796, Hahnemann had begun developing homoeopathic vaccination for scarlet fever and other diseases, and by 1831 he had clearly outlined his theory of germ-based causation in the cholera epidemic. Edward Jenner also introduced an effective smallpox vaccine in 1796-1798, based on exposure (by inoculation) to the less virulent cowpox, an idea that had already been proposed by others. Jenner, whose understandings developed over time, used a method not dissimilar to homoeopathy in principle. Furthermore, Hahnemann developed a ground-breaking scientific research method based on work in Austria, that is still adhered to today by medical researchers.

Many people remained skeptical of this "infectious micro-organism" ("germ") concept, due to prevailing beliefs about diseases being caused by "miasma", and later by more general ideas of sanitation. Pasteur persuasively demonstrated the validity of a germ theory of disease, and on May 22 1881, he set out to prove an early example of veterinary vaccination. The anthrax vaccine was administered to 25 sheep while another 25 were used as a control. On May 31 1881, all of the sheep were exposed to anthrax. While every sheep in the control group died, each of the vaccinated sheep survived. Pasteur's experiment would become a milestone in conventional disease prevention. His findings, in conjunction with other vaccines that followed, changed the way that the globalization of ideas in medicine affected the world.

=== Effects of globalization on disease in the modern world ===
Modern modes of transportation allow more people and products to travel around the world at a faster pace; they also open the airways to the transcontinental movement of infectious disease vectors. One example is the West Nile virus. It is believed that this disease reached the United States via "mosquitoes that crossed the ocean by riding in airplane wheel wells and arrived in New York City in 1999." With the use of air travel, people are able to go to foreign lands, contract a disease and not have any symptoms of illness until after they get home, and having exposed others to the disease along the way. Another example of the potency of modern modes of transportation in increasing the spread of disease is the 1918 Spanish Flu pandemic. Global transportation, back in the early 20th century, was able to spread a virus because the network of transmittance and trade was already global. The virus was found on crew members of ships and trains, and all the infected employees spread the virus everywhere they traveled. As a result, almost 50-100 million people died of this global transmission.

As medicine has progressed, many vaccines and cures have been developed for some of the worst diseases (plague, syphilis, typhus, cholera, malaria) that people develop. But, because the evolution of disease organisms is rapid, even with vaccines, there is difficulty providing full immunity to many diseases. Since vaccines are made partly from the virus itself, when an unknown virus is introduced into the environment, it takes time for the medical community to formulate a curative vaccine. The lack of operational and functional research and data, which provide a quicker and more strategized pathway to a reliable vaccine, makes for a lengthy vaccine development timeline. Even though frameworks are set up and preparations plans are utilized to decrease the COVID-19 cases, a vaccine is the only broadly accepted way to ensure complete immunization. Some systems like the IIS, Immunization Information System, help give preliminary structure for quick responses to outbreaks and unknown viruses. These systems employ past data and research-based on modern world vaccine development successes. Finding vaccines at all for some diseases remains extremely difficult. Without vaccines, the global world remains vulnerable to infectious diseases.

Evolution of disease presents a major threat in modern times. For example, the current "swine flu" or H1N1 virus is a new strain of an old form of flu, known for centuries as Asian flu based on its origin on that continent. From 1918 to 1920, a post-World War I global influenza epidemic killed an estimated 50–100 million peens, including half a million in the United States alone. H1N1 is a virus that has evolved from and partially combined with portions of avian, swine, and human flu.

Globalization has increased the spread of infectious diseases from South to North, but also the risk of non-communicable diseases by transmission of culture and behavior from North to South. It is important to target and reduce the spread of infectious diseases in developing countries. However, addressing the risk factors of non-communicable diseases and lifestyle risks in the South that cause disease, such as use or consumption of tobacco, alcohol, and unhealthy foods, is important as well.

Even during pandemics, it is vital to recognize economic globalization in being a catalyst in the spread of the coronavirus. Economic factors are especially damaged by increased global lockdown regulations and trade blockades. As transportation globalized, economies expanded. Internalized economies saw great financial opportunities in global trade. With increased interconnectivity among economies and the globalization of the world economy, the spread of the coronavirus maximized the potentiality of global recessions. The coronavirus pandemic caused many economic disruptions, which caused a functional disconnect in the supply chain and the flow of goods. As transportation modes are relevant to the spread of infectious diseases, it is important to also recognize the economy being the motor of this globalized transmission system.

== Specific diseases ==
=== Plague ===
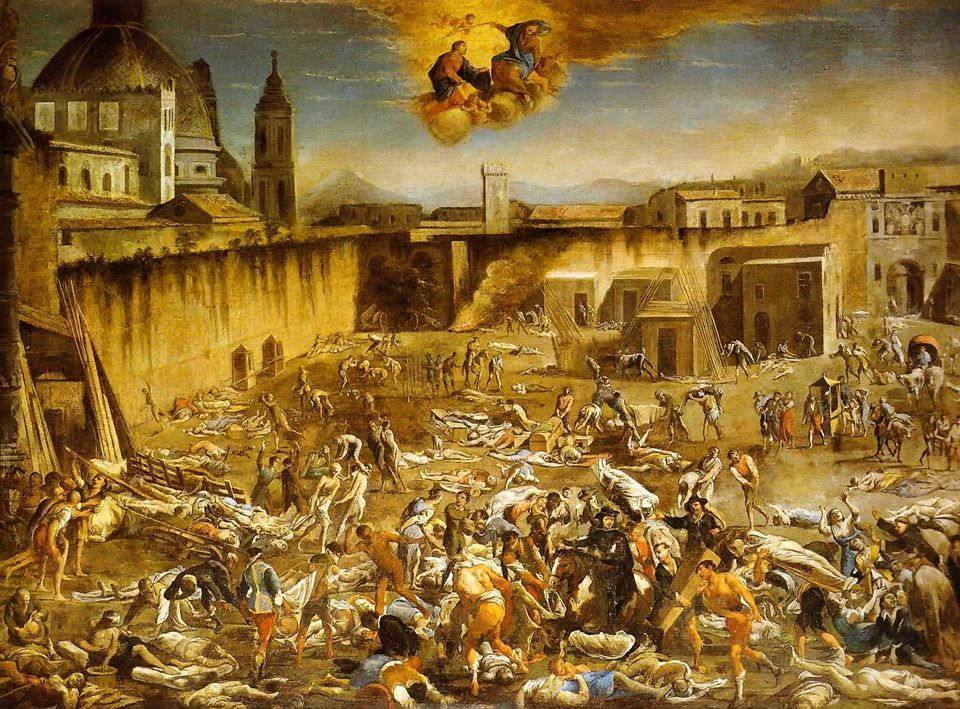
Contemporary engraving of Naples during the Naples Plague in 1656

Bubonic plague is a variant of the deadly flea-borne disease plague, which is caused by the enterobacteria Yersinia pestis, that devastated human populations beginning in the 14th century. Bubonic plague is primarily spread by fleas that lived on the black rat, an animal that originated in South Asia and spread to Europe by the 6th century. It became common to cities and villages, traveling by ship with explorers. A human would become infected after being bitten by an infected flea. The first sign of an infection of bubonic plague is swelling of the lymph nodes, and the formation of buboes. These buboes would first appear in the groin or armpit area, and would often ooze pus or blood. Eventually infected individuals would become covered with dark splotches caused by bleeding under the skin. The symptoms would be accompanied by a high fever, and within four to seven days of infection, more than half of the affected would die.

The first recorded outbreak of plague occurred in China in the 1330s, a time when China was engaged in substantial trade with western Asia and Europe. The plague reached Europe in October 1347. It was thought to have been brought into Europe through the port of Messina, Sicily, by a fleet of Genoese trading ships from Kaffa, a seaport on the Crimean peninsula. When the ship left port in Kaffa, many of the inhabitants of the town were dying, and the crew was in a hurry to leave. By the time the fleet reached Messina, all the crew were either dead or dying; the rats that took passage with the ship slipped unnoticed to shore and carried the disease with them and their fleas.

Within Europe, the plague struck port cities first, then followed people along both sea and land trade routes. It raged through Italy into France and the British Isles. It was carried over the Alps into Switzerland, and eastward into Hungary and Russia. For a time during the 14th and 15th centuries, the plague would recede. Every ten to twenty years, it would return. Later epidemics, however, were never as widespread as the earlier outbreaks, when 60% of the population died.

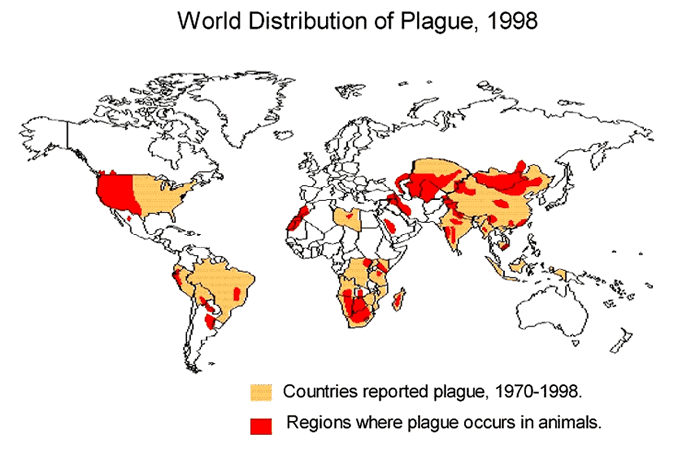
Worldwide distribution of plague-infected animals, 1998

The third plague pandemic emerged in Yunnan province of China in the mid-nineteenth century. It spread east and south through China, reaching Guangzhou (Canton) and Hong Kong in 1894, where it entered the global maritime trade routes. Plague reached Singapore and Bombay in 1896. China lost an estimated 2 million people between plague's reappearance in the mid-nineteenth century and its retreat in the mid-twentieth. In India, between 1896 and the 1920s, plague claimed an estimated 12 million lives, most in the Bombay province. Plague spread into the countries around the Indian Ocean, the Red Sea and the Mediterranean. From China it also spread eastward to Japan, the Philippines and Hawaii, and in Central Asia it spread overland into the Russian territories from Siberia to Turkistan. By 1901 there had been outbreaks of plague on every continent, and new plague reservoirs would produce regular outbreaks over the ensuing decades.

=== Measles ===
Measles is a highly contagious airborne virus spread by contact with infected oral and nasal fluids. When a person with measles coughs or sneezes, they release microscopic particles into the air. During the 4- to 12-day incubation period, an infected individual shows no symptoms, but as the disease progresses, the following symptoms appear: runny nose, cough, red eyes, extremely high fever and a rash.

Measles is an endemic disease, meaning that it has been continually present in a community, and many people developed resistance. In populations that have not been exposed to measles, exposure to the new disease can be devastating. In 1529, a measles outbreak in Cuba killed two-thirds of the natives who had previously survived smallpox. Two years later measles was responsible for the deaths of half the indigenous population of Honduras, and ravaged Mexico, Central America, and the Inca civilization.

Historically, measles was very prevalent throughout the world, as it is highly contagious. According to the National Immunization Program, 90% of people were infected with measles by age 15, acquiring immunity to further outbreaks. Until a vaccine was developed in 1963, measles was considered to be deadlier than smallpox. Vaccination reduced the number of reported occurrences by 98%. Major epidemics have predominantly occurred in unvaccinated populations, particularly among nonwhite Hispanic and African American children under 5 years old. In 2000 a group of experts determined that measles was no longer endemic in the United States. The majority of cases that occur are among immigrants from other countries.

=== Typhus ===
Typhus is caused by rickettsia, which is transmitted to humans through lice. The main vector for typhus is the rat flea. Flea bites and infected flea faeces in the respiratory tract are the two most common methods of transmission. In areas where rats are not common, typhus may also be transmitted through cat and opossum fleas. The incubation period of typhus is 7–14 days. The symptoms start with a fever, then headache, rash, and eventually stupor. Spontaneous recovery occurs in 80–90% of victims.

The first outbreak of typhus was recorded in 1489. Historians believe that troops from the Balkans, hired by the Spanish army, brought it to Spain with them. By 1490 typhus traveled from the eastern Mediterranean into Spain and Italy, and by 1494, it had swept across Europe. From 1500 to 1914, more soldiers were killed by typhus than from all the combined military actions during that time. It was a disease associated with the crowded conditions of urban poverty and refugees as well. Finally, during World War I, governments instituted preventative delousing measures among the armed forces and other groups, and the disease began to decline. The creation of antibiotics has allowed disease to be controlled within two days of taking a 200 mg dose of tetracycline.

=== Syphilis ===
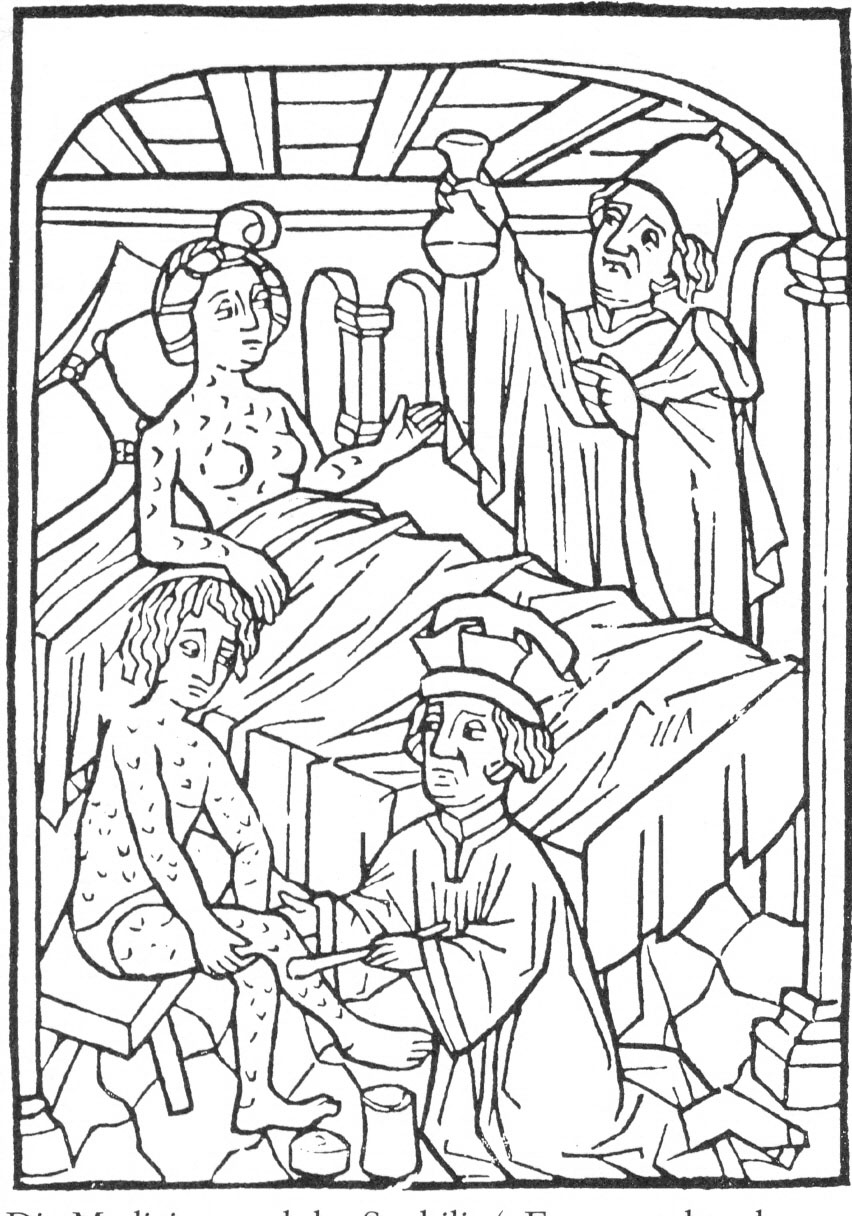
An early medical illustration of people with syphilis, Vienna, 1498

Syphilis is a sexually transmitted disease that causes open sores, delirium and rotting skin, and is characterized by genital ulcers. Syphilis can also do damage to the nervous system, brain and heart. The disease can be transmitted from mother to child.

The origins of syphilis are unknown, and some historians argue that it descended from a twenty-thousand-year-old African zoonosis. Other historians place its emergence in the New World, arguing that the crews of Columbus's ships first brought the disease to Europe. The first recorded case of syphilis occurred in Naples in 1495, after King Charles VIII of France besieged the city of Naples, Italy. The soldiers, and the prostitutes who followed their camps, came from all corners of Europe. When they went home, they took the disease with them and spread it across the continent.

=== Smallpox ===
Smallpox is a highly contagious disease caused by the Variola virus. There are four variations of smallpox; variola major, variola minor, haemorrhagic, and malignant, with the most common being variola major and variola minor. Symptoms of the disease including hemorrhaging, blindness, back ache, vomiting, which generally occur shortly after the 12- to 17-day incubation period. The virus begins to attack skin cells, and eventually leads to an eruption of pimples that cover the whole body. As the disease progresses, the pimples fill up with pus or merge. This merging results in a sheet that can detach the bottom layer from the top layer of skin. The disease is easily transmitted through airborne pathways (coughing, sneezing, and breathing), as well as through contaminated bedding, clothing or other fabrics,

It is believed that smallpox first emerged over 3000 years ago, probably in India or Egypt. There have been numerous recorded devastating epidemics throughout the world, with high losses of life.

Smallpox was a common disease in Eurasia in the 15th century, and was spread by explorers and invaders. After Columbus landed on the island of Hispaniola during his second voyage in 1493, local people started to die of a virulent infection. Before the smallpox epidemic started, more than one million indigenous people had lived on the island; afterward, only ten thousand had survived.

During the 16th century, Spanish soldiers introduced smallpox by contact with natives of the Aztec capital Tenochtitlan. A devastating epidemic broke out among the indigenous people, killing thousands.

In 1617, smallpox reached Massachusetts, probably brought by earlier explorers to Nova Scotia, Canada." By 1638 the disease had broken out among people in Boston, Massachusetts. In 1721 people fled the city after an outbreak, but the residents spread the disease to others throughout the Thirteen Colonies. Smallpox broke out in six separate epidemics in the United States through 1968.

The smallpox vaccine was developed in 1798 by Edward Jenner. By 1979 the disease had been completely eradicated, with no new outbreaks. The WHO stopped providing vaccinations and by 1986, vaccination was no longer necessary to anyone in the world except in the event of future outbreak.

=== Leprosy ===
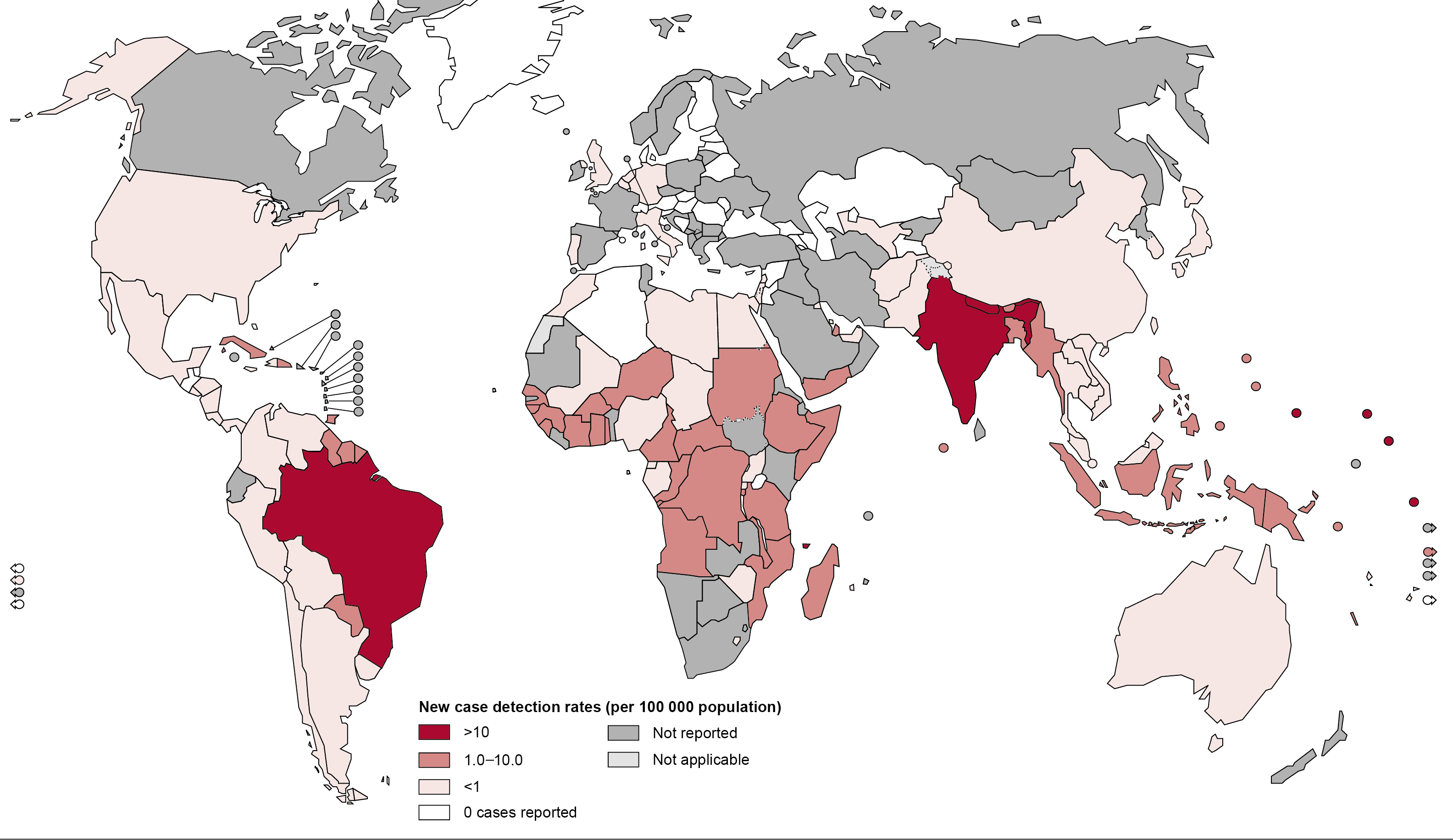
New cases of leprosy in 2016

Leprosy, also known as Hansen's Disease, is caused by a bacillus, Mycobacterium leprae. It is a chronic disease with an incubation period of up to five years. Symptoms often include irritation or erosion of the skin, and effects on the peripheral nerves, mucosa of the upper respiratory tract and eyes. The most common sign of leprosy are pale reddish spots on the skin that lack sensation.

Leprosy originated in India, more than four thousand years ago. It was prevalent in ancient societies in China, Egypt and India, and was transmitted throughout the world by various traveling groups, including Roman Legionnaires, Crusaders, Spanish conquistadors, Asian seafarers, European colonists, and Arab, African, and American slave traders. Some historians believe that Alexander the Great's troops brought leprosy from India to Europe during the 3rd century BC. With the help of the crusaders and other travelers, leprosy reached epidemic proportions by the 13th century.

Once detected, leprosy can be cured using multi-drug therapy, composed of two or three antibiotics, depending on the type of leprosy. In 1991 the World Health Assembly began an attempt to eliminate leprosy. By 2005 116 of 122 countries were reported to be free of leprosy.

=== Malaria ===
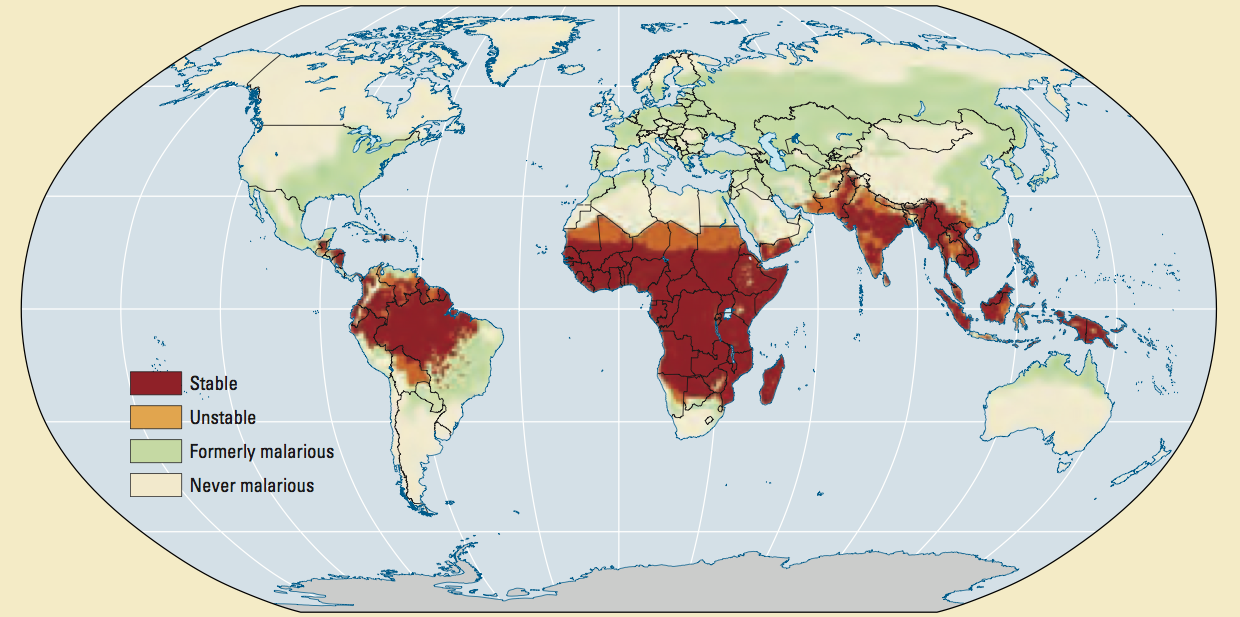
Past and current malaria prevalence in 2009

On Nov. 6, 1880 Alphonse Laveran discovered that malaria (then called "Marsh Fever") was a protozoan parasite, and that mosquitoes carry and transmit malaria. Malaria is a protozoan infectious disease that is generally transmitted to humans by mosquitoes between dusk and dawn. The European variety, known as "vivax" after the Plasmodium vivax parasite, causes a relatively mild, yet chronically aggravating disease. The west African variety is caused by the sporozoan parasite, Plasmodium falciparum, and results in a severely debilitating and deadly disease.

Malaria was common in parts of the world where it has now disappeared, as the vast majority of Europe (disease of African descent are particularly diffused in the Empire romain) and North America . In some parts of England, mortality due to malaria was comparable to that of sub-Saharan Africa today. Although William Shakespeare was born at the beginning of a colder period called the "Little Ice Age", he knew enough ravages of this disease to include in eight parts. Plasmodium vivax lasted until 1958 in the polders of Belgium and the Netherlands. In the 1500s, it was the European settlers and their slaves who probably brought malaria on the American continent (we know that Columbus had this disease before his arrival in the new land). The Spanish Jesuit missionaries saw the Indians bordering on Lake Loxa Peru used the Cinchona bark powder to treat fevers. However, there is no reference to malaria in the medical literature of the Maya or Aztecs. The use of the bark of the "fever tree" was introduced into European medicine by Jesuit missionaries whose Bernabé Cobo who experimented in 1632 and also by exports, which contributed to the precious powder also being called "Jesuit powder". A study in 2012 of thousands of genetic markers for Plasmodium falciparum samples confirmed the African origin of the parasite in South America (Europeans themselves have been affected by this disease through Africa): it borrowed from the mid-sixteenth century and the mid-nineteenth the two main roads of the slave trade, the first leading to the north of South America (Colombia) by the Spanish, the second most leading south (Brazil) by Portugueses.

Parts of Third World countries are more affected by malaria than the rest of the world. For instance, many inhabitants of sub-Saharan Africa are affected by recurring attacks of malaria throughout their lives. In many areas of Africa, there is limited running water. The residents' use of wells and cisterns provides many sites for the breeding of mosquitoes and spread of the disease. Mosquitoes use areas of standing water like marshes, wetlands, and water drums to breed.

=== Tuberculosis ===
In 2007, the prevalence of TB per 100,000 people was highest in Sub-Saharan Africa, and was also relatively high in Asian countries like India.

The bacterium that causes tuberculosis, Mycobacterium tuberculosis, is generally spread when an infected person coughs and another person inhales the bacteria. Once inhaled TB frequently grows in the lungs, but can spread to any part of the body. Although TB is highly contagious, in most cases the human body is able to fend off the bacteria. But, TB can remain dormant in the body for years, and become active unexpectedly. If and when the disease does become active in the body, it can multiply rapidly, causing the person to develop many symptoms including cough (sometimes with blood), night sweats, fever, chest pains, loss of appetite and loss of weight. This disease can occur in both adults and children and is especially common among those with weak or undeveloped immune systems.

Tuberculosis (TB) has been one of history's greatest killers, taking the lives of over 3 million people annually. It has been called the "white plague". According to the WHO, approximately fifty percent of people infected with TB today live in Asia. It is the most prevalent, life-threatening infection among AIDS patients. It has increased in areas where HIV seroprevalence is high.

Air travel and the other methods of travel which have made global interaction easier, have increased the spread of TB across different societies. Luckily, the BCG vaccine was developed, which prevents TB meningitis and miliary TB in childhood. However, the vaccine does not provide substantial protection against the more virulent forms of TB found among adults. Most forms of TB can be treated with antibiotics to kill the bacteria. The two antibiotics most commonly used are rifampicin and isoniazid. There are dangers, however, of a rise of antibiotic-resistant TB. The TB treatment regimen is lengthy, and difficult for poor and disorganized people to complete, increasing resistance of bacteria. Antibiotic-resistant TB is also known as "multidrug-resistant tuberculosis." "Multidrug-resistant tuberculosis" is a pandemic that is on the rise. Patients with MDR-TB are mostly young adults who are not infected with HIV or have other existing illness. Due to the lack of health care infrastructure in underdeveloped countries, there is a debate as to whether treating MDR-TB will be cost effective or not. The reason is the high cost of "second-line" antituberculosis medications. It has been argued that the reason the cost of treating patients with MDR-TB is high is because there has been a shift in focus in the medical field, in particular the rise of AIDS, which is now the world's leading infectious cause of death. Nonetheless, it is still important to put in the effort to help and treat patients with "multidrug-resistant tuberculosis" in poor countries.

=== HIV/AIDS ===
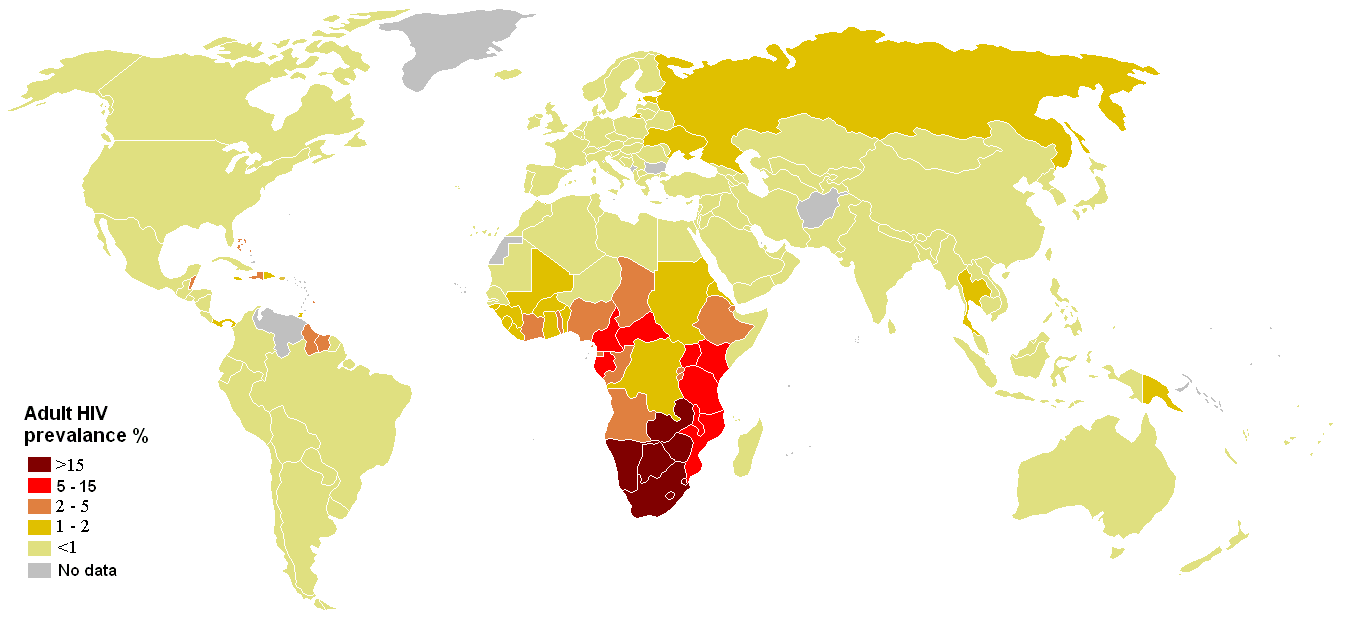
Estimated HIV/AIDS prevalence among young adults (15–49) by country as of 2008

HIV and AIDS are among the newest and deadliest diseases. According to the World Health Organization, it is unknown where the HIV virus originated, but it appeared to move from animals to humans. It may have been isolated within many groups throughout the world. It is believed that HIV arose from another, less harmful virus, that mutated and became more virulent. The first two AIDS/HIV cases were detected in 1981. As of 2013, an estimated 1.3 million persons in the United States were living with HIV or AIDS, almost 110,000 in the UK and an estimated 35 million people worldwide are living with HIV".

Despite efforts in numerous countries, awareness and prevention programs have not been effective enough to reduce the numbers of new HIV cases in many parts of the world, where it is associated with high mobility of men, poverty and sexual mores among certain populations. Uganda has had an effective program, however. Even in countries where the epidemic has a very high impact, such as Eswatini and South Africa, a large proportion of the population do not believe they are at risk of becoming infected. Even in countries such as the UK, there is no significant decline in certain at-risk communities. 2014 saw the greatest number of new diagnoses in gay men, the equivalent of nine being diagnosed a day.

Initially, HIV prevention methods focused primarily on preventing the sexual transmission of HIV through behaviour change. The ABC Approach - "Abstinence, Be faithful, Use a Condom". However, by the mid-2000s, it became evident that effective HIV prevention requires more than that and that interventions need to take into account underlying socio-cultural, economic, political, legal and other contextual factors.

=== Ebola ===
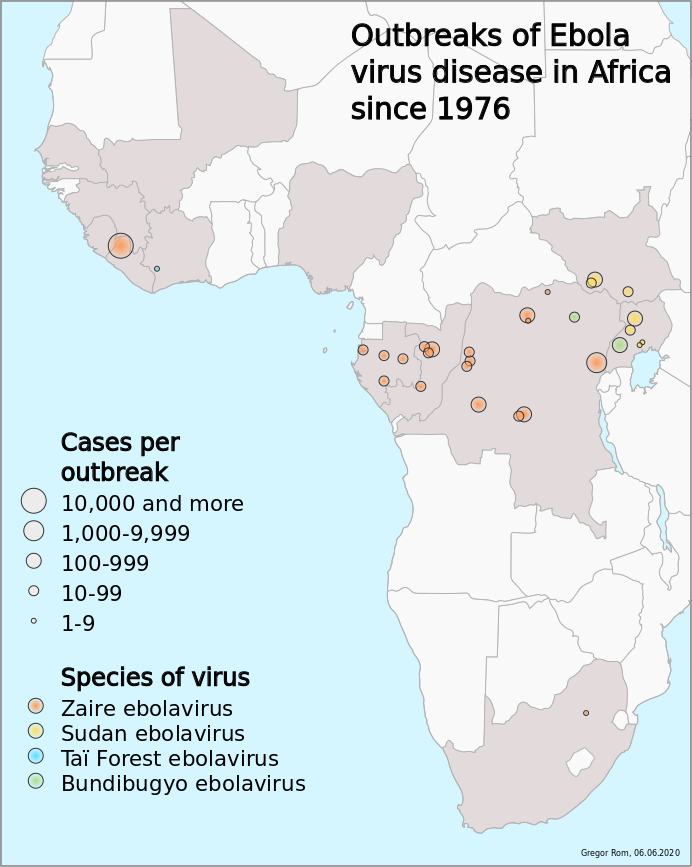
Cases of Ebola fever in Africa since 1976

The Ebola outbreak, which was the 26th outbreak since 1976, started in Guinea in March 2014. The WHO warned that the number of Ebola patients could rise to 20,000, and said that it used $489m (£294m) to contain Ebola within six to nine months. The outbreak was accelerating. Medecins sans Frontieres has just opened a new Ebola hospital in Monrovia, and after one week it already has a capacity of 120 patients. It said that the number of patients seeking treatment at its new Monrovia center was increasing faster than they could handle both in terms of the number of beds and the capacity of the staff, adding that it was struggling to cope with the caseload in the Liberian capital. Lindis Hurum, MSF's emergency coordinator in Monrovia, said that it was humanitarian emergency and they needed a full-scale humanitarian response. Brice de la Vinge, MSF director of operations, said that it was not until five months after the declaration of the Ebola outbreak that serious discussions started about international leadership and coordination, and said that it was not acceptable.

=== Leptospirosis ===
Leptospirosis, also known as the "rat fever" or "field fever", is an infection caused by Leptospira. Symptoms can range from none to mild such as headaches, muscle pains, and fevers; to severe with bleeding from the lungs or meningitis. Leptospira is transmitted by both wild and domestic animals, most commonly by rodents. It is often transmitted by animal urine or by water or soil containing animal urine coming into contact with breaks in the skin, eyes, mouth, or nose. The countries with the highest reported incidence are located in the Asia-Pacific region (Seychelles, India, Sri Lanka and Thailand) with incidence rates over 10 per 1,000,000 people as well as in Latin America and the Caribbean (Trinidad and Tobago, Barbados, Jamaica, El Salvador, Uruguay, Cuba, Nicaragua and Costa Rica) However, the rise in global travel and eco-tourism has led to dramatic changes in the epidemiology of leptospirosis, and travelers from around the world have become exposed to the threat of leptospirosis. Despite decreasing prevalence of leptospirosis in endemic regions, previously non-endemic countries are now reporting increasing numbers of cases due to recreational exposure International travelers engaged in adventure sports are directly exposed to numerous infectious agents in the environment and now comprise a growing proportion of cases worldwide.

=== Disease X ===
The World Health Organization (WHO) proposed the name Disease X in 2018 to focus on preparations and predictions of a major pandemic.

=== COVID-19 ===
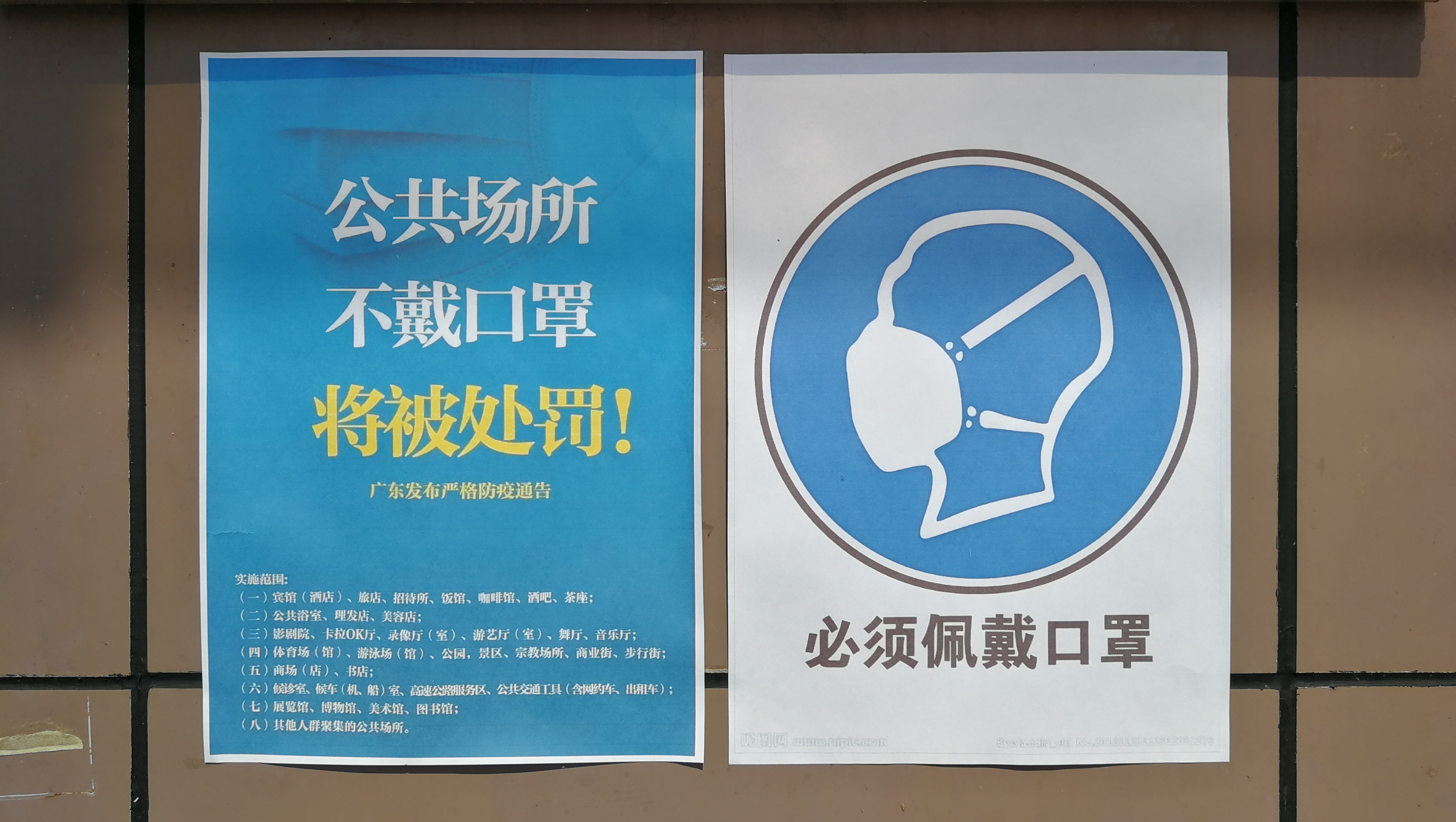
Sign requiring people to wear masks against the COVID-19 pandemic (China, 2020)

The virus outbreak originated in Wuhan, China. It was first detected in December 2019, which is why scientists called it COVID-19 (coronavirus disease 2019). This outbreak has since caused a health issue in the city of Wuhan, China which evolved into a global pandemic. The World Health Organization officially declared it a pandemic on March 11, 2020.

As of May 2020, scientists believe that COVID-19, a zoonotic disease, is linked to the wet markets in China. Epidemiologists have also warned of the virus's contagiousness. Specialists have declared that the spread of SARS-CoV-2 is still unknown. The generally accepted notion among virologists and experts is that the action of inhaling droplets from an infected person is most likely the way SARS-CoV-2 is spreading. As more people travel and more goods and capital are traded globally, COVID-19 cases started to slowly appear all over the world.

Some of the symptoms that COVID-19 patients could experience is shortness of breath (which might be a sign of pneumonia), cough, fever, and diarrhea. The three most recorded and common symptoms are fever, tiredness, and coughing, as reported by the World Health Organization. COVID-19 is also categorized among the viruses that can show no symptoms in the carrier. Asymptomatic COVID-19 carriers transmitted the virus to many people which eventually did show symptoms, some being deadly.

The first number of cases was detected in Wuhan, China, the origin of the outbreak. On December 31, 2019, Wuhan Municipal Health Commission announced to the World Health Organization that the number of pneumonia cases that have been previously detected in Wuhan, Hubei Province is now under investigation. Proper identification of a novel coronavirus was developed and reported, making the pneumonia cases in China the first reported cases of COVID-19. As of November 25, 2021, there have been around 260 million confirmed COVID-19 cases around the world. Confirmed deaths as a result of COVID-19 is over 5 million globally. Over 235 million of the 260 million confirmed COVID-19 cases have successfully recovered. Countries showing lack of preparation and awareness in January and February 2020 are now reporting the highest numbers of COVID-19 cases. The United States leads the worldwide count with almost 49 million confirmed cases. Deaths in The United States have crossed 798,000 by 2022, maintaining the highest death count of any country. Brazil, Russia, Spain, UK, and Italy have all suffered because of the increase in cases, leading to an impaired health system unable to attend to so many sick people at one time.

The first-ever confirmed case of COVID-19 in the United States was in Washington State on January 21, 2020. It was a man who had just returned from China. Following this incident, on January 31, 2020, Trump announced that travel to and from China was restricted, effective on February 2, 2020. On March 11, 2020, Trump issued an executive order to restrict travel from Europe, except for the UK and Ireland. On May 24, 2020, Trump banned travel from Brazil, as Brazil became the new center of the coronavirus pandemic. International restrictions were set to decrease international entities of entering a country, potentially carrying the virus. This is because governments understand that with the accessibility in travel and free trade, any person can travel and carry the virus to a new environment. Recommendations to U.S. travelers have been set by the State Department. As of March 19, 2020, some countries were marked Level 4 "do not travel". The coronavirus pandemic travel restrictions have affected almost 93% of the global population. Increased travel restrictions effectively aid multilateral and bilateral health organizations to control the number of confirmed cases of COVID-19.

== Non-communicable disease ==
Globalization can benefit people with non-communicable diseases such as heart problems or mental health problems.

Global trade and rules set forth by the World Trade Organization are believed to actually benefit the health of people by making their incomes higher, allowing them to afford better health care. However this makes many non-communicable diseases more likely as well. The national income of a country, mostly obtained by trading on the global market, is important because it dictates how much a government spends on health care for its citizens.

It must also be acknowledged that an expansion in the definition of disease often accompanies development, hence the net effect is not clearly beneficial due to this and other effects of increased affluence. Metabolic syndrome is one obvious example, although the poorest countries have not yet experienced this broadscale, and are still grappling with the infectious diseases listed above and the health impacts of poverty.

== Economic globalization and disease ==
The concept and reality of globalization is multifaceted in implementation, and is intended to be objective in its framework and systemic ideology. Infectious diseases have spread globally mainly as a result of the modern globalization of almost all industries and sectors.

Economic globalization is the interconnectivity of world economies and the interdependency of internal and external supply chains. With the advancement of science and technology, the possibility of economic globalization is enabled even more. Economic factors have been defined by global boundaries rather than national limitations. The cost of conducting activities included among economic measures has - debatably - been significantly decreased as a result of the advancements in the fields of technology and science, thereby slowly creating an interconnected global economy lacking centralized integration.

As economies increase their levels of integration within their international partnerships, any substantial global financial and economic disruptions tend toward causing a global recession. Collateral damage is further observed with increases in integrated economic activity. Countries' policies lean more on economic benefits than health benefits, which leads to miscalculated and ill-reported health issues.

== See also ==
- Chagas disease
- Eradication of infectious diseases
- Global catastrophic risk
- Infectious disease
- List of epidemics
- Pandemic
- Rodentology
- Transmission (medicine)
- Tropical disease
- Virgin soil epidemic
- Wildlife smuggling and zoonoses
