= Rocio viral encephalitis =

Viral disease of humans

Rocio viral encephalitis is an epidemic flaviviral disease of humans first observed in São Paulo State, Brazil, in 1975. Low-level enzootic transmission is likely continuing in the epidemic zone, and with increased deforestation and population expansion, additional epidemics caused by Rocio virus are highly probable. If migratory species of birds are, or become involved in, the virus transmission cycle, the competency of a wide variety of mosquito species for transmitting Rocio virus experimentally suggest that the virus may become more widely distributed. The encephalitis outbreak in the Western Hemisphere caused by West Nile virus, a related flavivirus, highlights the potential for arboviruses to cause severe problems far from their source enzootic foci.

The causative Rocio virus belongs to the genus Orthoflavivirus (the same genus as the Zika virus) in family Flaviviridae and is closely related serologically to Ilhéus, St. Louis encephalitis, Japanese encephalitis and Murray Valley encephalitis viruses.

== Outbreaks ==
During 1975 and 1976, Rocio virus was responsible for several epidemics of meningoencephalitis in coastal communities in southern São Paulo, Brazil. The outbreaks affected over 1,000 people and killed about 10% of those infected, but apparently responded well to treatment for viral encephalitides. The disease progresses rapidly after onset, with patients dying within 5 days of symptoms first appearing. The disease first presents with fever, headache, vomiting, and conjunctivitis, then progresses to neurological symptoms (confusion, disorientation, etc.) and muscle weakness; about one-third of cases enter a coma, and a third of those patients die, although supportive care such as intensive nursing and symptomatic treatment might reduce the case fatality rate to 4%. Survivors show neurological and psychological after-effects (sequelae) in about 20% of cases.

== Reservoirs and vectors ==
Neither the epidemic nor the epizootic cycles of Rocio virus have been defined, but field and laboratory studies indicate the probable involvement of birds as a virus reservoir and mosquitoes as vectors.

About 25% of wild birds in the epidemic zone tested during the time of the outbreaks were found to have antibodies to flaviviruses, with Rocio virus the most reactive antigen. Strains of Rocio virus were isolated from the blood of a rufous-collared sparrow, Zonotrichia capensis. Rocio virus was also isolated from sentinel mice exposed in a suspended cage, suggesting that a flying arthropod was the probable vector. Experimental studies with Colorado House sparrows, Passer domesticus, have indicated that the population tested was not a good amplification host for Rocio virus.

Psorophora ferox was the only mosquito species directly implicated in transmission through detection of virus in specimens collected at the outbreak site, but species of Culex (Melanoconion), Coquillettidia chrysonotum, Mansonia indubitans, Ochlerotatus scapularis, Ochlerotatus serratus, and other mosquitoes in Tribes Culicini, Anophelini and Sabethini were also present in those collections. Studies with mosquitoes from the epidemic zone after the outbreak showed that Psorophora ferox and Ochlerotatus scapularis could be classified as potential vectors, but Ochlerotatus serratus was relatively insusceptible. Field investigations in the late 1970s and 1980s showed that Ochlerotatus scapularis, Ochlerotatus serratus and species of Culex (Melanoconion) were the predominant mosquitoes in the epidemic zone, and that Ochlerotatus scapularis was the most common and abundant mosquito in human settlements and human-made environments. Outside the epidemic zone, laboratory studies have shown that Culex tarsalis mosquitoes from Arizona and Culex pipiens pipiens mosquitoes from Illinois were relatively efficient experimental vectors; Tennessee Culex pipiens subspecies and Argentina Culex pipiens quinquefasciatus were moderately efficient experimental vectors; Louisiana Psorophora ferox, and Culex nigripalpus and Culex opisthopus from Florida were relatively inefficient experimental vectors. Psorophora ferox and Aedes scapularis were shown to be susceptible to per os infection with Rocio virus and could transmit the virus by bite following an incubation period, whereas infection rates in Ochlerotatus serratus did not exceed 36% and an ID50 could not be calculated for this species so it is unlikely to be an epidemiologically important vector of Rocio virus.
