= Wildlife disease =

Disease affecting wild animal species

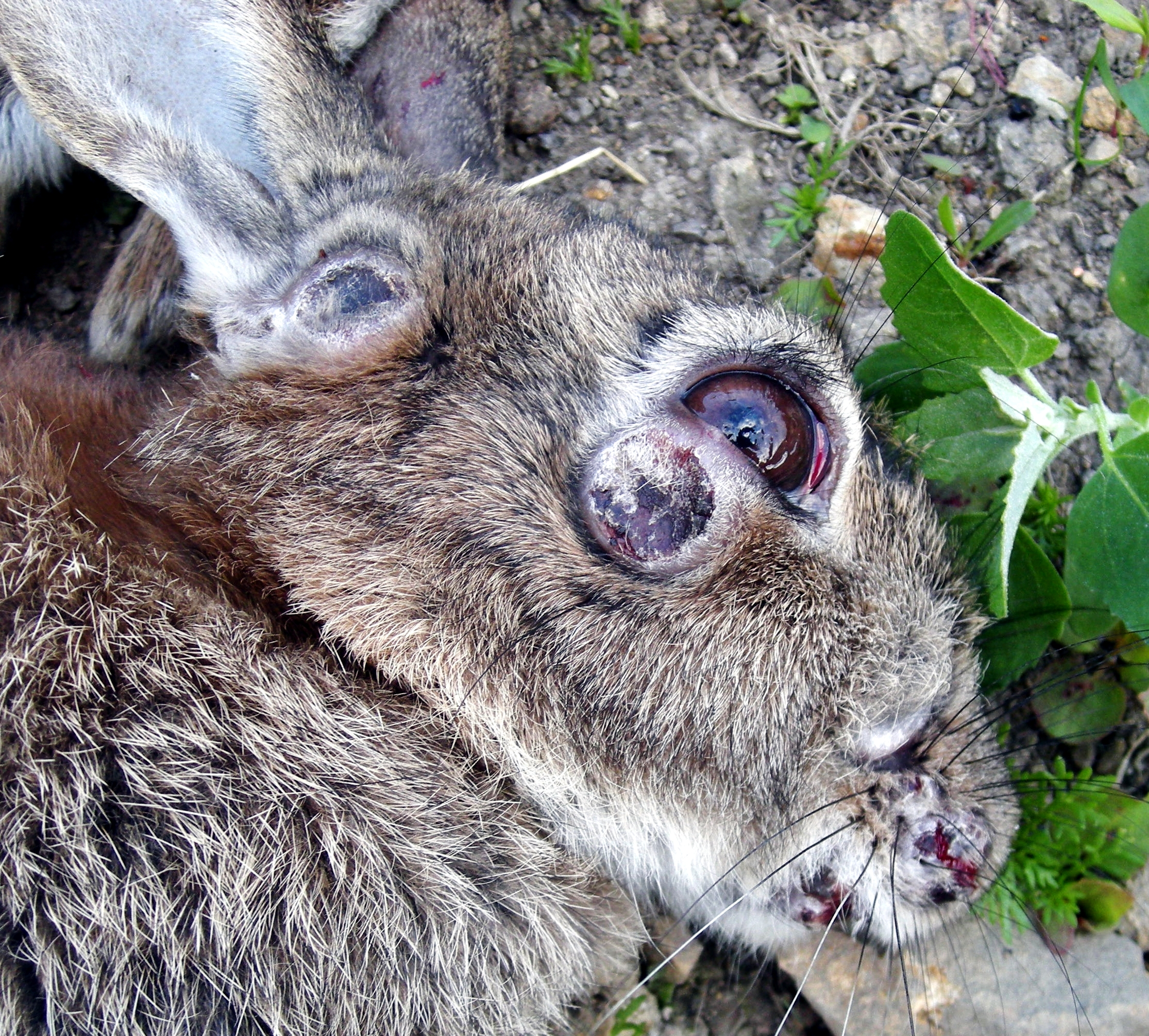
A European Rabbit afflicted by Myxomatosis in England.

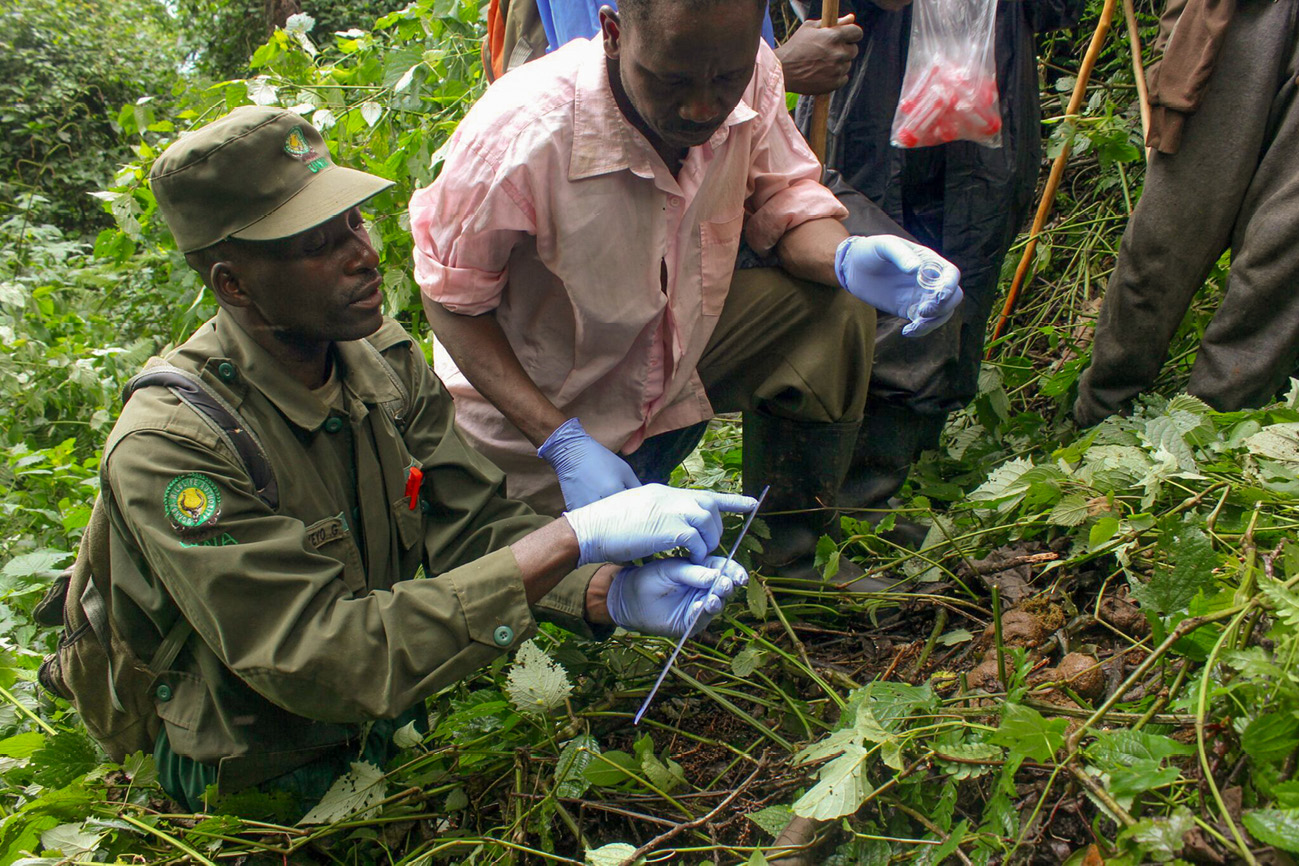
A park ranger from the Uganda Wildlife Authority teaching volunteers how to collect gorilla faecal samples.

Wildlife disease is an abnormal health condition affecting a wild animal species. In many cases, wildlife hosts can act as a reservoir of diseases that spillover into domestic animals, people and other species. Wildlife diseases spread through both direct contact between two individual animals or indirectly through the environment. Additionally, human industry has created the possibility for cross-species transmission through the wildlife trade.

Furthermore, there are many relationships that must be considered when discussing wildlife disease, which are represented through the Epidemiological Triad Model. This model describes the relationship between a pathogen, host and the environment. There are many routes to infection of a susceptible host by a pathogen, but when the host becomes infected that host now has the potential to infect other hosts. Whereas, environmental factors affect pathogen persistence and spread through host movement and interactions with other species.

An example to apply to the ecological triad is Lyme disease, where changes in environment have changed the distribution of Lyme disease and its vector, the Ixodes tick. The recent increase in wildlife disease occurrences is cause for concern among conservationists, as many vulnerable species do not have the population to recover from devastating disease outbreaks.

== Transmission ==
=== Indirect ===
Wildlife may come in contact with pathogens through indirect vectors such as their environment by consuming infected food and water, breathing contaminated air, or encountering virulent urine or feces from an infected organism. This type of transmission is typically associated with pathogens that are able to survive prolonged periods, with or without a host organism.

The most recognizable wildlife disease that indirectly spreads are prion disease. Prion diseases are indirectly spread due to their longevity in the environment, lasting for several months once released from a host via their excretions (urine or feces). Notable animal prion diseases include chronic wasting disease in cervids, scrapie in sheep and goats, and various types of spongiform encephalopathy including bovine (also known as mad cow disease), mink, feline, and ungulate.

=== Direct ===
Disease can be spread from organism to organism through direct contact such as exposure to infected blood, mucus, milk (in mammals), saliva, or sexual fluids such as vaginal secretions and semen.

A prominent example of direct infection is facial tumor disease in Tasmanian devils, as these marsupials will repeatedly bite other individuals in the face during the breeding season. These open wounds allow transmission via blood and saliva in the devil's orifices.

=== Wildlife Trade ===
A major driver for transmission between species recently is wildlife trade, as many organisms that do not typically encounter each other naturally are in close proximity. This can include places such as wet markets as well as the illegal trade of both live and dead animals and their body parts.

The most notable example of wildlife trade impacting both animal and human health is COVID-19, originating in a wet market in Wuhan, China. The originating species has been a topic of debate as it is unclear due to the variety of species found at the market, however pangolins and bats both have been absolved of blame despite initial claims.

== Zoonoses ==
Wild animals, domestic animals and humans share a large and increasing number of infectious diseases, known as zoonoses. The continued globalization of society, human population growth, and associated landscape change further increase the interactions between humans and other animals, thereby facilitating additional infectious disease emergence. Contemporary diseases of zoonotic origin include SARS, Lyme disease and West Nile virus.

Disease emergence and resurgence in populations of wild animals are considered an important topic for conservationists, as these diseases can affect the sustainability of affected populations and the long-term survival of some species. Examples of such diseases include chytridiomycosis in amphibians, chronic wasting disease in deer, white-nose syndrome, in bats, and devil facial tumour disease in Tasmanian devils.

== Wildlife Disease Management ==
Wildlife disease management serves to protect not only the animals at hand but also the equilibrium that favors ecosystems, and in turn, the planet's health. Wildlife diseases have gained recognition as a big issue, increasingly so in the present with greater human impacts on the environment, and this concern is shared by conservationists and all those who cherish biodiversity: Managing wildlife diseases is complex and requires to have the understanding of the science and the heart to realize that wildlife health sometimes becomes intermingled with other health issues concerning environment and humans.

=== Role of humans ===
Human impact has put in place both direct and indirect pathways of propagating disease through wildlife populations. Habitat destruction, climate change, and the increasing footprint of humans in landscapes formerly reserved for wildlife contribute to increasing susceptibility of wildlife to pathogens. For example, deforestation can bring previously isolated species into close contact with each other and us, creating new interfaces for disease jump from animals to humans. Climate change compounds the problem by altering the habitat of vectors and reservoirs of many diseases, like ticks, that transmit Lyme disease to both animals and humans.

Environmental changes and human encroachment upon wild spaces increase human-wildlife interactions: agriculture, construction, wildlife trade, etc. These interactions are accelerating interspecies transmission of disease, sometimes triggering devastating outbreaks.

=== Modern approaches ===
These form the basis of wildlife disease management that is multipronged: research, conservation, and community engagement. One of the most frequently applied methods is vaccination. Vaccines have proven effective in controlling the spread of certain wildlife diseases, much like their human counterparts. For example, oral rabies vaccination programs among raccoons and foxes have proved valuable in controlling rabies in some wild animal populations in the United States and Europe. In practice, these programs work very well since they are non-invasive; the animal merely has to take the vaccine imbedded in bait left in areas where it is most apt to encounter it.

Another method is culling. It means killing selectively an animal to prevent disease spread in the herd. Culling is helpful in some cases; however, it has been a controversial practice. One typical use of culling is to control the disease of bovine tuberculosis in badgers in the UK, although it has attracted widespread animal rights-harms and ecological disruption debates. Opponents turn against culling on the grounds that it can disrupt the ecosystem and cause a loss in biodiversity. Animal rights activists call for the humane methods such as improving wildlife-habitated areas or performing mass vaccination programs, instead.

=== Coping with joint benefits ===
Wildlife disease management is not an isolated endeavor. It requires collaboration among various stakeholders such as scientists, conservationists, veterinarians, governments, and the crowd. The devil facial tumor disease (DFTD) is one successful example of a reaction to a public outcry for a collaborative effort. This has wiped out most of the Tasmanian devils. Some genetic research, captive breeding, and vaccination development has given a massive boost to save the species. Thus, this species becomes closely linked to such collective actions by the scientific community in conservation efforts.

Furthermore, the pandemic of COVID-19 made it clear how important international participation is for organizations such as the World Health Organization, the Food and Agriculture Organization, and wildlife organizations in dealing with such zoonotic diseases. It is a reminder that protecting wildlife health is, at best, endangering biodiversity and, at worst, fighting for the sake of mankind.

=== Surveillance and early detection ===
In short, prevention is always better than cure, and early detection is crucial in stopping wildlife diseases from becoming outbreaks. Geographic Information Systems serve to track the incidence of a disease in real-time by mapping these occasions. Such GIS systems allow for rapid access by scientists to see where disease is most likely to emerge so action can be taken before spread occurs.

Moreover, genetic sequencing is becoming more commonly used to trace the evolutionary trajectories of pathogens. By studying the DNA of viruses, bacteria, and fungi, scientists will gain an insight valuable for possible predictions of future pandemics, often describing surveillance systems that complement disease evolution understanding. Examples range across several species and through diverse disease-associated populations such as avian influenza, chronic wasting disease, and the Zika virus among animals.

=== Ethical issues ===
Ethical dilemmas in wildlife disease management are some of the most difficult issues to plow through. Culling: closure would be the most immediate means to contain an outbreak by its most easily achieved and then surely raised concerns over animal rights, as much as possible like those from ecosystem disruption. A wildlife disease management program can be hampered by a raging resistance from animal rights advocates on the humane alternatives such as vaccination or rehabilitation, rejecting lethal means of capture.

Finding a balance between effective disease management and ethical considerations remains a key challenge in wildlife conservation. Humane methods are usually costlier, but they promise longer-term solutions. Habitat restoration to help wildlife recover and thrive in its natural home should be part of the solution.

== Prevention ==
=== Culling ===
Disease outbreaks in wild animals are sometimes controlled by killing infected individuals to prevent transmission to domestic and economically important animals. While easy and quick for disease management, culling has the consequence of disrupting ecosystem function and reducing biodiversity of the population due to the loss of individuals. Animal rights advocates argue against culling, as they consider individual wild animals to be intrinsically valuable and believe that they have a right to live. Activists favor humane methods of prevention such as vaccination or treatment via rehab centers, as these are non-lethal forms of management.

=== Vaccination programs ===
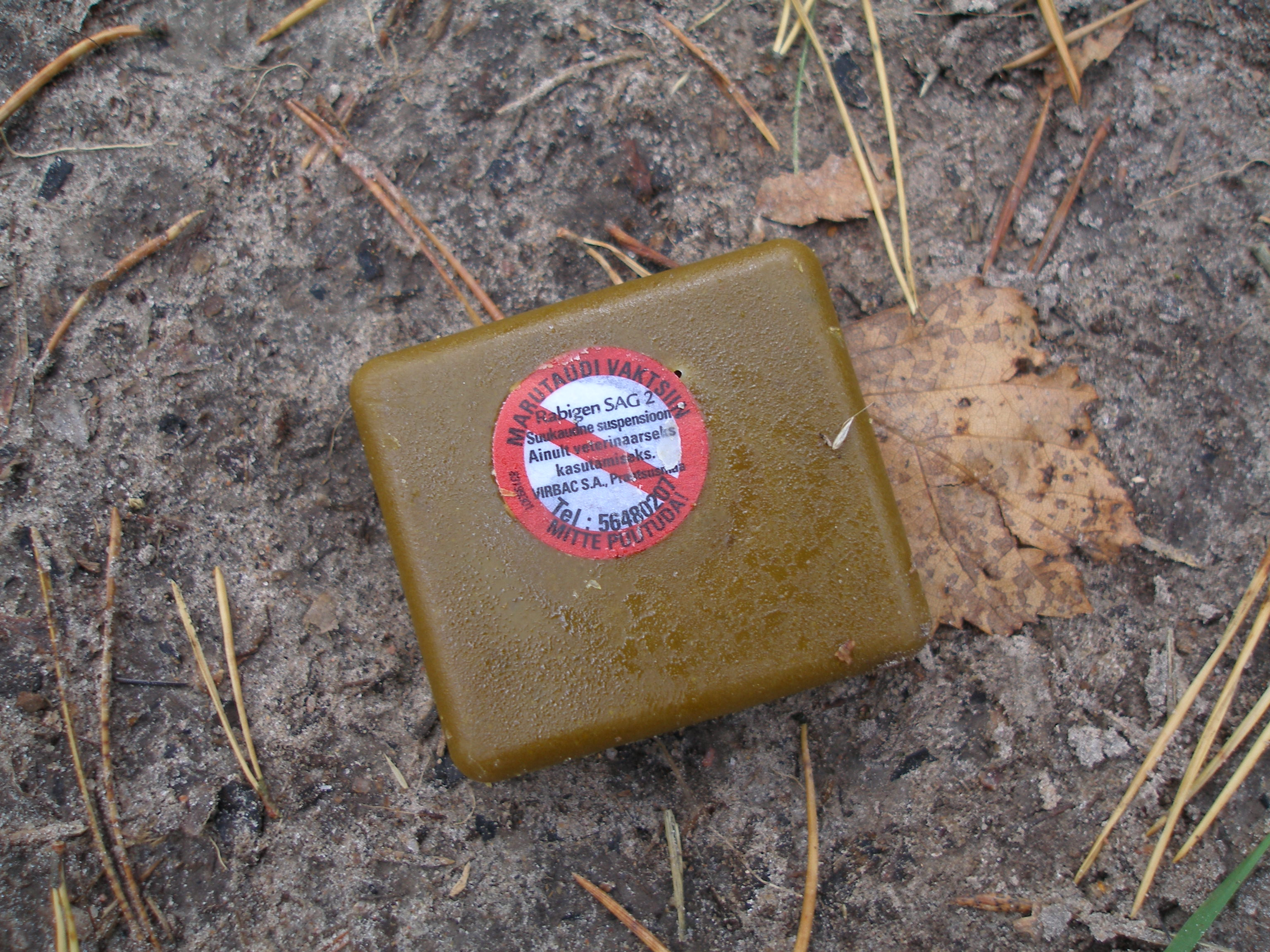
Oral rabies vaccine in bait

Wild animal suffering, as a result of disease, has been drawn attention to by some authors, who argue that we should alleviate this form of suffering through vaccination programs. Such programs are also deemed beneficial for reducing the exposure of humans and domestic animals to disease and for species conservation.

The oral rabies vaccine has been used successfully in multiple countries to control the spread of rabies among populations of wild animals and reduce human exposure. Australia, the UK, Spain and New Zealand have all conducted successful vaccination programs to prevent Bovine Tuberculosis, by vaccinating badgers, possums and wild boar.

In response to the COVID-19 pandemic, it has been proposed that, in the future, wild animals could be vaccinated against coronaviruses to relieve the suffering of the affected animals, prevent disease transmission and inform future vaccination efforts.

== Conservation ==
=== Populations in decline ===
When an epidemic strikes a population of organisms, the loss of individuals can be detrimental to already fragile or fragmented populations. Many disease epidemics have largely reduced the population of their host organisms, some even increasing the possibility of an endangered or extinct status.

==== Notable epidemics impacting species ====
- Chronic wasting disease in cervids, both wild and captive
- Influenza and its variations (avian and swine) impact birds and pigs respectively
- White-nose syndrome in bats
- Chytrid fungi in amphibians
- Facial tumors in Tasmanian devils
- Fibro-papillomatosis in sea turtles
- Whirling disease in various fish such as trout and salmon

=== Recovery ===
While disease can ravage a population, many wildlife are resilient and can recuperate their population loss. Human intervention can also increase the chances of species recovering from epidemics via various prevention and treatment methods. Individuals that survive epidemics can repopulate, now with disease resistance present in the gene pool of that population. This will result in future generations of a species that are less susceptible to a specific disease.

==== Notable species that recovered From epidemics ====
- Canids such as foxes and coyotes steadily recovered from mange
- Black-footed ferrets recovered from Sylvatic Plague
- Sea urchins recovered from a ciliate parasite known as Philaster apodigitformis

== See also ==
- Zoonosis
- Epizootic
- Threshold host density
- Wildlife management
- List of zoonotic diseases
