= Wildlife trade and zoonoses =

Health risks associated with the trade in exotic wildlife

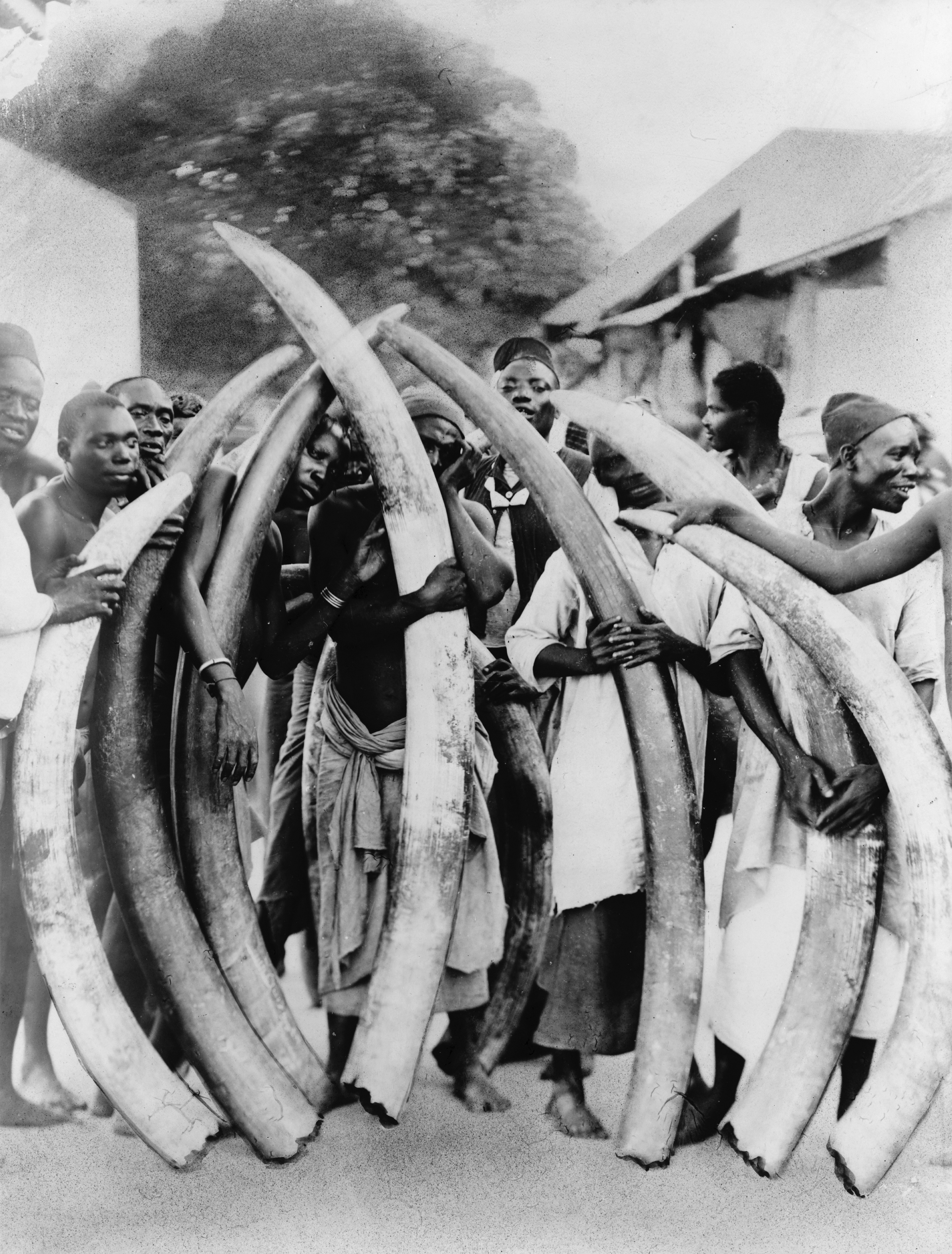
Wildlife poachers assembling tusks for ivory trade

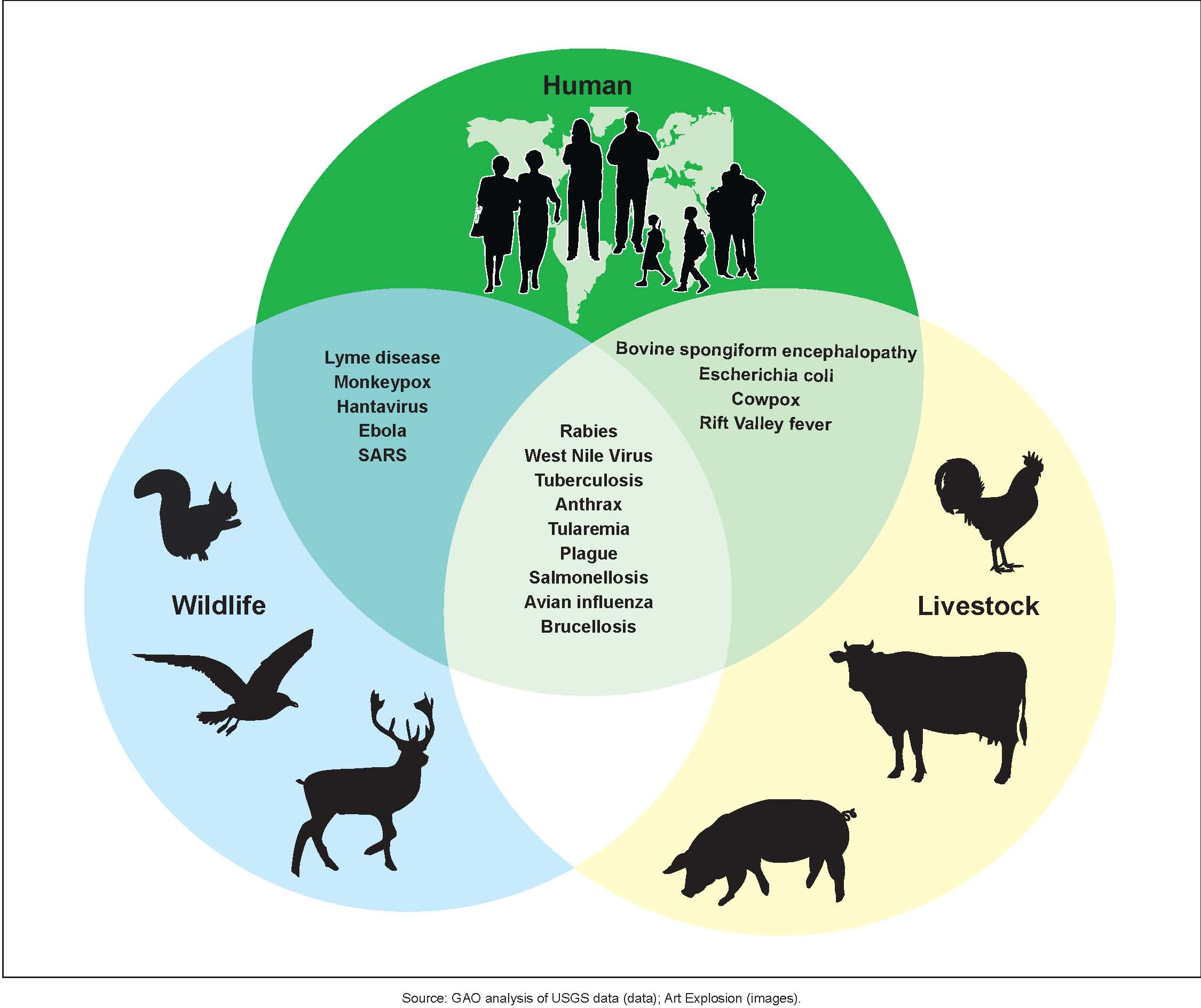
The possibilities for zoonotic disease transmissions

Wildlife trafficking practices have resulted in the emergence of zoonotic diseases. Exotic wildlife trafficking is a multi-billion dollar industry that involves the removal and shipment of mammals, reptiles, amphibians, invertebrates, and fish all over the world. Traded wild animals are used for bushmeat consumption, unconventional exotic pets, animal skin clothing accessories, home trophy decorations, privately owned zoos, and for traditional medicine practices. Dating back centuries, people from Africa, Asia, Latin America, the Middle East, and Europe have used animal bones, horns, or organs for their believed healing effects on the human body. Wild tigers, rhinos, elephants, pangolins, and certain reptile species are acquired through legal and illegal trade operations in order to continue these historic cultural healing practices. Within the last decade nearly 975 different wild animal taxa groups have been legally and illegally exported out of Africa and imported into areas like China, Japan, Indonesia, the United States, Russia, Europe, and South America.

Consuming or owning exotic animals can propose unexpected and dangerous health risks. A number of animals, wild or domesticated, carry infectious diseases and approximately 75% of wildlife diseases are vector-borne viral zoonotic diseases. Zoonotic diseases are complex infections residing in animals and can be transmitted to humans. The emergence of zoonotic diseases usually occurs in three stages. Initially the disease is spread through a series of spillover events between domesticated and wildlife populations living in close quarters. Diseases then spread through series of direct contact methods, indirect contact methods, contaminated foods, or vector-borne transmissions. After one of these transmission methods occurs, the disease then rises exponentially in human populations living in close proximities.

After the appearance of the COVID-19 pandemic, whose origins have been linked to the Huanan Seafood Wholesale Market in Wuhan, China, Elizabeth Maruma Mrema, the acting executive secretary of the UN Convention on Biological Diversity, called for a global ban on wildlife markets to prevent future pandemics. Others have also called for a total ban on the global wildlife trade or for already existing bans to be enforced, in order both to reduce cruelty to animals as well as to reduce health risks to humans, or to implement other disease control intervention measures in lieu of total bans.

== One Health perspective ==
Wildlife trade is increasingly addressed through a One Health framework because the health of humans, animals, and ecosystems is closely interconnected. The World Health Organization describes One Health as an integrated, unifying approach that links people, animals, and the environment, and notes that trade in live wild animals can increase the likelihood of disease spillover into humans. In the wildlife trade supply chain, capture, transport, holding, and sale may bring wild animals, domestic animals, and humans into close contact, especially where animal welfare, hygiene, and biosecurity measures are limited. WOAH has similarly emphasized that wildlife health, ecosystem health, and human health should be addressed together, rather than as separate sectors.

=== Drivers of disease emergence ===
Human activities that alter ecosystems can amplify the disease risks associated with wildlife trade. According to WHO, important stressors include animal trade, agriculture, livestock farming, urbanization, extractive industries, climate change, habitat fragmentation, and encroachment into wild areas. UNEP has likewise described zoonotic emergence as being driven by land-use change, exploitation of wildlife, and intensified contact among people, domestic animals, and wildlife. These pressures can interact with the wildlife trade chain, where animals from different sources and species may be mixed during harvesting, transport, and market sale, creating additional opportunities for pathogen transmission and spillover.

=== Prevention and risk reduction ===
Recent guidance has increasingly favored risk-based management across the wildlife trade chain rather than a single uniform response. A rapid review commissioned by WOAH found substantial evidence gaps but concluded that disease prevention strategies should be evaluated in relation to feasibility, sustainability, biodiversity impacts, public health protection, and local livelihoods. WOAH's 2024 guidelines for addressing disease risks in wildlife trade propose a high-level framework based on stakeholder engagement, system mapping, hazard identification, risk assessment, risk management, risk communication, and monitoring and evaluation. Within a One Health approach, commonly recommended measures include stronger surveillance, improved sanitary and biosecurity standards, reduced high-risk cross-species mixing, protection of ecosystem integrity, and coordination among veterinary, public health, environmental, and trade authorities.

== Types of zoonotic disease transmissions ==
Direct contact transmissions occur when humans encounter first hand contaminated feces, urine, water sources, or bodily fluids. Bodily fluid transmission may happen either from ingesting pathogens or through open wound contact. Indirect contact transmissions occur when humans interact within an infected species' habitat. Humans are often exposed to contaminated soils, plants, and surfaces where bacterial germs are present. Contaminated food transmissions occur when humans eat infected bushmeat, vegetables, fruits, or drink contaminated water. Often these food and water supplies are tainted by fecal pellets of infected bats, birds, or monkeys. Vector-borne transmissions occur when individuals are bitten by infected parasites such as ticks or insects like mosquitos and fleas.

Other factors for escalated disease transmissions include climate change, globalization of trade, accelerated logging practices, irrigation increases, sexual activity between individuals, blood transfusions, and urbanization developments near infected ecosystems.

== Health risks of zoonotic diseases ==
Exotic wildlife trafficking admits a number of infectious diseases that spell potential life-threatening results for human populations if contracted. Researchers believe eliminating the transmission of infectious diseases is not plausible. Instead, the implementation of health screening and surveillance measures is considered important for minimizing transmission risks among human populations and wildlife species involved in trade, particularly at key points along the trade chain, such as capture, transport, and sale.

Annually, 15.8% of human deaths have been associated with dangerous infectious disease outbreaks linked to exotic trafficking. Researchers, zoologists, and environmentalists determine that financially poor countries in Africa may attribute to nearly 44% of these deaths due to zoonosis related diseases.

== Cultural determinants and disease exposure in Africa ==
People in Africa are exposed to an increased risk of contracting and dispatching life-threatening zoonotic infections. The continent is considered a hot spot for emerging disease transmissions for reasons like socio-culture livelihood interests, livestock farming, land use methods, globalization influences, and consumption behavior practices.

=== Socio-cultural livelihood factors ===
Many Africans make a living from the wildlife trade due to the high market demand for exotic animals. These individuals partaking in poaching activities are able to produce an income by selling to vendors all around the world. However, hunters are highly susceptible to encountering infected droplets, water sources, soils, carcasses, and viral airborne pathogens while traveling through the bush. Once they have successfully hunted and killed the wild animal, they run the risk of blood or bodily fluid transfer from close contact with possible infected species. They're also at an increased risk of harvesting arthropod-borne pathogens carried in ticks. Often ticks can be found on the wild animal or in its surrounding wildlife habitat.

=== Livestock and land use methods ===
A study conducted in Tanzania revealed major gaps in locals knowledge of zoonotic diseases. Individuals in these pastoral communities acknowledged health symptoms commonly found in both humans and animals, however they did not have a synthesized term for zoonosis and believed pathogens were not life-threatening. Researchers found that the pastoral communities were more concerned with keeping cultural practices of producing cooked meals rather than the potential infections harvested from the animals.

=== Globalization influence ===
The urbanization of new environments in Africa increases the migration patterns of humans. New settlements and tourist attractions near these wildlife habitats bring vulnerable individuals with no disease immunity closer to areas of diseases.

=== Consumption behaviors ===
The greatest possibility of contracting deadly zoonotic diseases occurs during the bushmeat cooking process. Cooking exotic bushmeat requires sharp knives, steady handwork, and skilled techniques when correctly butchering an animal. Consumers often purchase bushmeat directly from African poachers. This means they have no way of knowing whether the wild animal is carrying dangerous zoonotic pathogens. On average people cut themselves 38% of the time when butchering bushmeat, allowing for infected bodily fluid transmissions. African women are more likely to contract these dangerous zoonotic pathogens because they are the ones handling and cooking the bushmeat.

== Zoonoses in wildlife markets ==
If sanitation standards are not maintained, live animal markets can transmit zoonoses. Because of the openness, newly introduced animals may come in direct contact with sales clerks, butchers, and customers or to other animals which they would never interact with in the wild. This may allow for some animals to act as intermediate hosts, helping a disease spread to humans.

Due to unhygienic sanitation standards and the connection to the spread of zoonoses and pandemics, critics have grouped live animal markets together with factory farming as major health hazards in China and across the world. In March and April 2020, some reports have said that wildlife markets in Asia, Africa, and in general all over the world are prone to health risks.

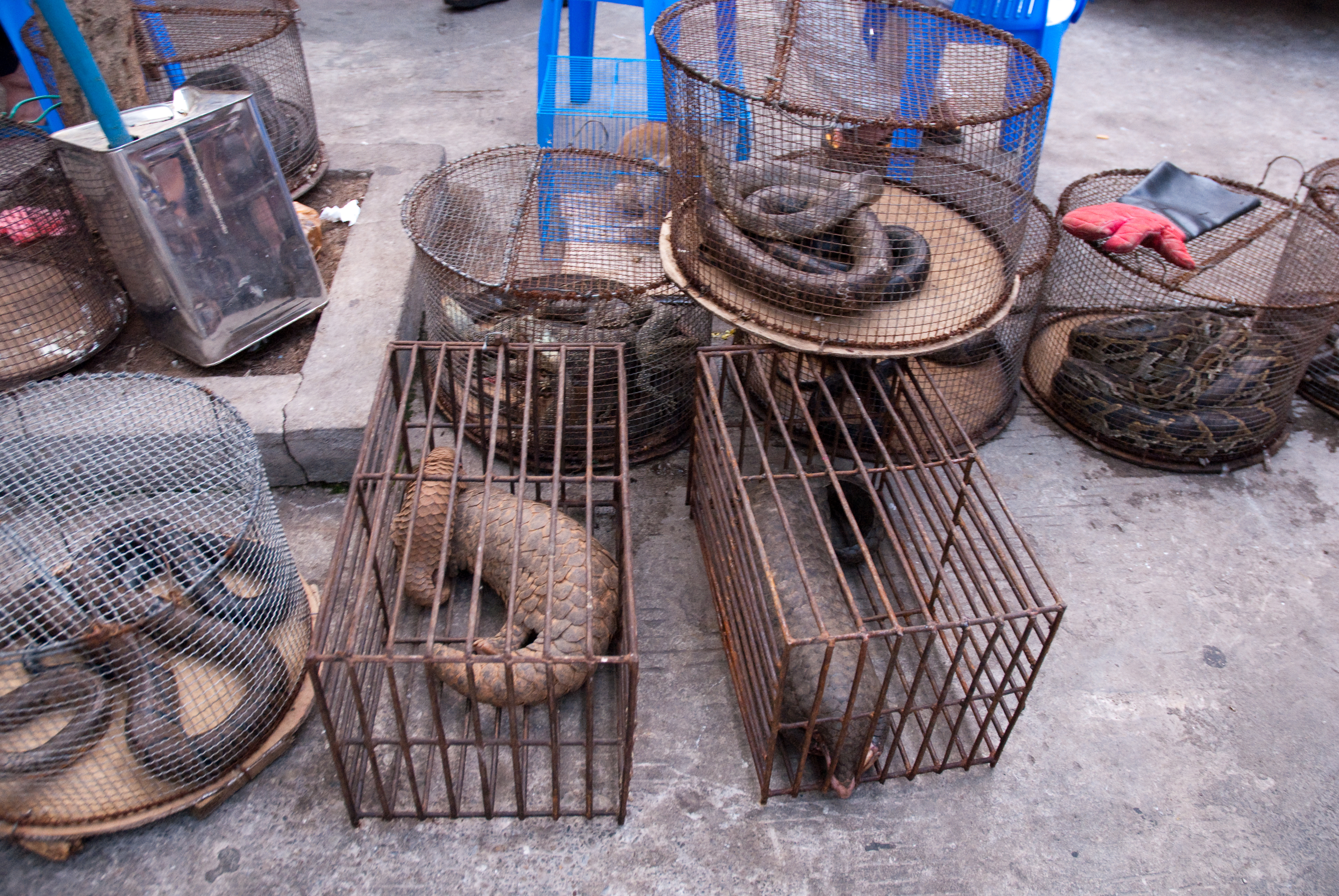
Cages with pangolins and snakes at a wildlife market in Mong La, Myanmar.

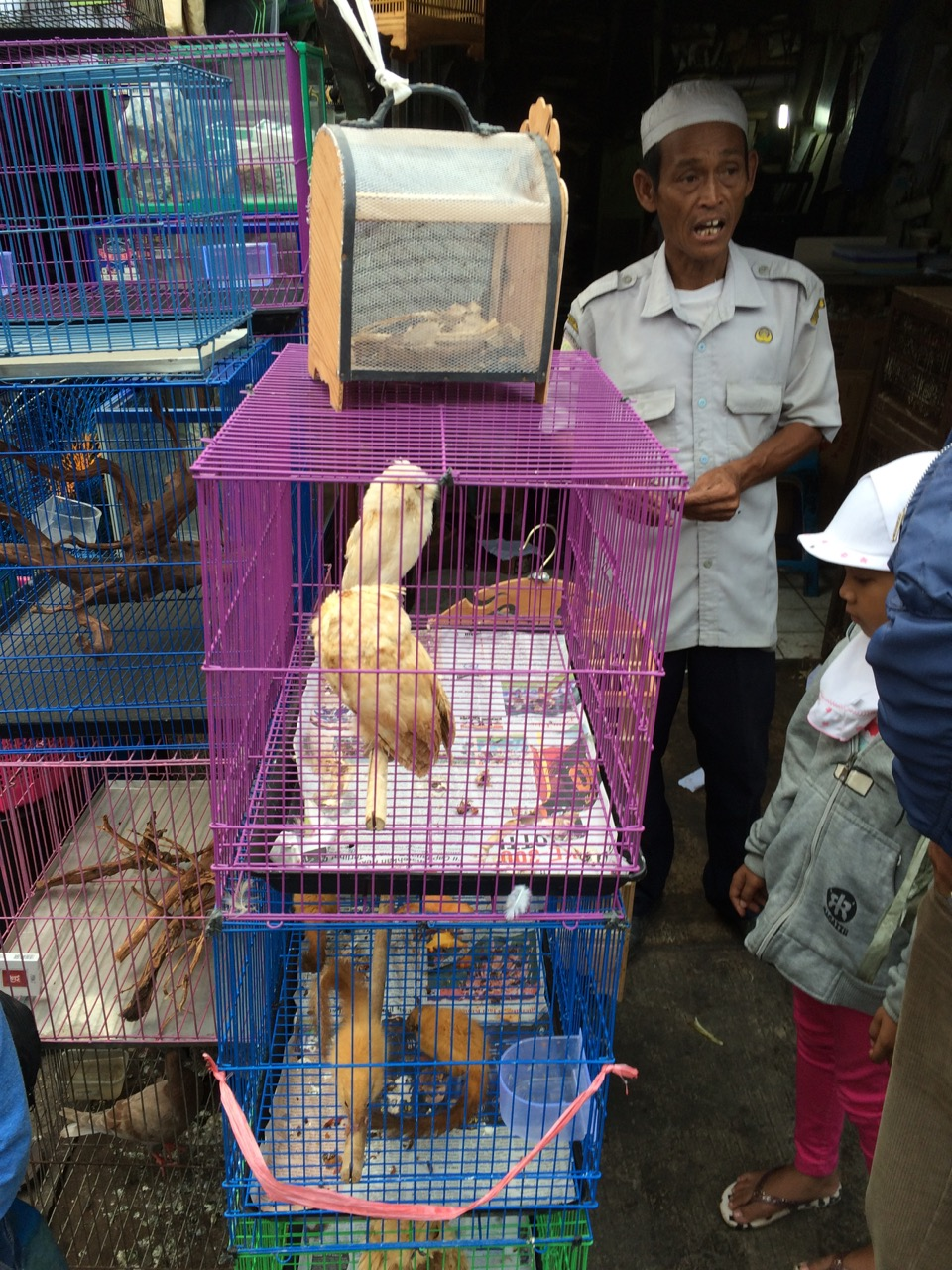
Cages with owls and tree shrews at Jatinegara Market in Jakarta, Indonesia

Unsanitary conditions with different species packed tightly are known to spread disease.

=== Avian influenza ===
H5N1 avian flu outbreaks can be traced to live animal markets where the potential for zoonotic transmission is greatly increased.

=== COVID-19 ===
The exact origin of the COVID-19 pandemic is yet to be confirmed as of February 2021 and was originally linked to the Huanan Seafood Wholesale Market in Wuhan, China due to reports that two-thirds of the initial cases had direct exposure to the Huanan Seafood Wholesale Market in Wuhan. although a 2021 WHO investigation concluded that the Huanan market was unlikely to be the origin due to the existence of earlier cases. The Huanan market sold "live wolf pups, salamanders, civets, and bamboo rats" amongst other species.

Alternate theories and misinformation emerged in January that the viruses were instead artificially created in a laboratory, but these claims were largely rejected by scientists and news outlets as unfounded rumours and conspiracy theories. In April 2020, United States intelligence officials launched examinations into unverified reports that the virus may have originated from accidental exposure of scientists studying coronaviruses in bats at the BSL-4-capable Wuhan Institute of Virology rather than a wildlife market. On 3 May 2020, United States Secretary of State Mike Pompeo claimed that there is "enormous evidence" that the coronavirus outbreak originated in a Chinese laboratory. However, Pompeo later distanced himself from the claim, while virologists have stated that available data overwhelmingly suggest that there was no chance of scientific misconduct or negligence such that the virus emerged from a lab.

In May 2020, George Gao, the director of the Chinese Center for Disease Control and Prevention, said animal samples collected from the seafood market had tested negative for the virus, indicating that the market was the site of an early superspreading event, but it was not the site of the initial outbreak. The results of a WHO investigation yielded similar results, confirming what most scientists expected, that the location of the first contact with the virus was still unknown but unlikely to be the Huanan market due to the existence of earlier cases.

==== Media coverage ====
During the first few months of the COVID-19 pandemic in 2020, Chinese wet markets were heavily criticized in media outlets as a potential source for the virus. Media reports urging for permanent blanket bans on all wet markets, as opposed to solely live animal markets or wildlife markets, have been criticized for undermining infection control needs to be specific about wildlife markets, such as the Huanan Seafood Wholesale Market. Media focus on foreign wet markets has also been blamed for distracting public attention from public health threats, such as local sources of zoonotic diseases.

In Western media, wet markets have been portrayed during the COVID-19 pandemic without distinguishing between general wet markets, live animal wet markets, and wildlife markets, using montages of explicit images from different markets across Asia without identifying locations. Fairness & Accuracy in Reporting criticized several news articles from mainstream media outlets during the first half of 2020 as "ignorant or worse", pointing to sensationalist coverage utilizing graphic images for shock value. These depictions have been criticized as exaggerated and Orientalist, and have been blamed for fueling Sinophobia and "Chinese otherness".

=== Monkeypox ===
Monkeypox is a viral zoonotic double stranded DNA disease that occurs in both humans and animals. It often accumulates in wild animals and is transmitted by close contact within animal trade. It is most commonly found in central and west Africa where it is carried in a number of infected species including monkeys, apes, rats, prairie dogs, and other small rodents. In an attempt to reduce the rate of disease spread, researchers believe minimizing direct and indirect contact rates between species in wildlife trade markets is the most practical solution.

=== SARS ===
Influenza virus can change by genetic reassortment as it travels between different hosts in its range. The presence of different intermediate hosts in close proximity makes wildlife markets a high risk environment for such zoonoses.

Severe acute respiratory syndrome (SARS), often referred to as a severe form of pneumonia, is a highly contagious zoonotic respiratory illness causing extreme breathing difficulties. Factors attributing to widespread dispersal include the destruction of wildlife natural ecosystems, overextended urbanization effects on biodiversity, and contact with bacterially contaminated objects. The 2002–2004 SARS outbreak can be traced to live animal markets where the potential for zoonotic transmission is greatly increased. In a 2007 study, Chinese scientists identified the presence of SARS-CoV-like viruses in horseshoe bats combined with unsanitary wildlife markets and the culture of eating exotic mammals in southern China as a "time-bomb". In April 2020, scientist Peter Daszak described a Chinese wildlife market as follows: "it is a bit of shock to go to a wildlife market and see this huge diversity of animals live in cages on top of each other with a pile of guts that have been pulled out of an animal and thrown on the floor [...] These are perfect places for viruses to spread."

Chinese environmentalists, researchers and state media have called for stricter regulation of exotic animal trade in the markets. Medical experts Zhong Nanshan, Guan Yi and Yuen Kwok-yung have also called for the closure of wildlife markets since 2010.

== Other zoonoses ==
=== Ebola virus ===
Ebola virus disease is a rare infectious disease that is likely transmitted to humans by wild animals. The natural reservoirs of Ebola virus are unknown, but possible reservoirs include fruit bats, non-human primates, rodents, shrews, carnivores, and ungulates.

Transmission of this virus likely occurs when individuals live closely to infected habitats, exchange bodily liquids, or consume infected animals. West Africa's Ebola outbreak was termed the most destructive infectious disease epidemic in recent history, killing a total of 16,000 individuals between 2014 and 2015. Wildlife poachers have the greatest chance of contracting and dispersing this disease at they return from the bush.

=== HIV ===
HIV is a life-threatening virus that attacks the immune system. The virus weakens the white blood cell count and their ability to detect and ward off potentially harmful diseases. Dispersal of the disease includes acts of consuming infected bushmeat, pathogens coming into contact with open wounds, and through infected blood transfers. The two major strains of HIV, HIV-1 and HIV-2, are believed to have originated in West or Central Africa from strains of simian immunodeficiency virus (SIV) that infect non-human primates.

Some non-human primates infected with SIV are hunted and traded for bushmeat, traditional medicine, and the exotic pet trade, which may increase opportunities for cross-species transmission.

=== Bubonic plague ===
Bubonic plague is caused by the bacterium Yersinia pestis and is transmitted through open wound contact or exposure to contaminated bodily fluids. Oriental rat fleas, which are thought to originate in northern Africa carry the bacteria and transmit the disease by biting and infecting both humans and wild animals.

=== Marburg virus ===
Marburg virus, which causes Marburg virus disease, is a zoonotic RNA virus within the filovirus family. It is closely related to the Ebola virus and is transmitted by wild animals to humans. African monkeys and fruit bats are believed to be the main carries of the infectious disease. In 2012 the most recent outbreak occurred in Uganda, where fifteen individuals contracted the disease and four ultimately died from elevated hemorrhagic fevers. Rising numbers of deforestation, urbanization, and exotic animal trade have increased the likeliness of spreading this viral disease.

=== West Nile virus ===
West Nile virus is a single stranded RNA virus that can cause neurological diseases within humans. The first outbreak was recorded in Uganda and other areas of West Africa in 1937. Disease transmission is primarily through mosquitos feeding on infected dead birds. The infection then circulates within the mosquito and is transferred to humans or animals when bitten by the infected insect.

=== African trypanosomiasis ===
African trypanosomiasis or sleeping sickness is caused by a microscopic parasite called the Trypanosoma brucei, which is transferred to humans and animals through the bite of a tsetse fly. The disease is a reoccurring issue in many rural parts of Africa and over 500,000 individuals currently carry the disease. Livestock, game animals, and wild species of the bush are prone to the infection. Wildlife game markets and other exotic animal trade methods continue to spread transmission. These trade operations have introduced dangerous repercussions as the disease becomes more adaptive to drug resistance.

== Prevention and management ==
Managing the risk of zoonotic diseases includes educating those in the wildlife trade about potential disease hazards. Other ways to manage risk include creating disease surveillance systems to monitor all stages of wildlife trade, from sources to markets. Other suggestions include education about proper storage, handling, and cooking of wildlife.

Due to the suspicions that wet markets could have played a role in the emergence of COVID-19, a group of US lawmakers, NIAID director Anthony Fauci, UNEP biodiversity chief Elizabeth Maruma Mrema, and CBCGDF secretary general Zhou Jinfeng called in April 2020 for the global closure of wildlife markets due to the potential for zoonotic diseases and risk to endangered species. In April 2021, the World Health Organization called for a total ban on the sale of live animals in food markets in order to prevent future pandemics.

=== Prevention and risk reduction ===
Efforts to reduce zoonotic disease risks associated with wildlife trade increasingly focus on integrated, risk-based approaches aligned with the One Health framework. Recommended strategies include strengthening surveillance systems, improving sanitary and biosecurity measures, and implementing species- and context-specific risk assessments across the wildlife trade chain.

Additional measures include enhancing regulation and enforcement, promoting intersectoral collaboration between public health, veterinary, and environmental authorities, and improving data sharing across jurisdictions. These approaches aim to reduce opportunities for pathogen spillover while balancing conservation, livelihoods, and public health considerations.

Peer-reviewed research has also highlighted that both legal and illegal wildlife trade can facilitate the movement of pathogens across geographic regions and increase opportunities for cross-species transmission.

=== Policy and governance ===
Governance of wildlife trade and associated zoonotic disease risks involves multiple international and national frameworks operating across public health, animal health, and environmental sectors. The Convention on International Trade in Endangered Species of Wild Fauna and Flora (CITES) regulates international wildlife trade primarily for conservation purposes, but has increasingly been linked to discussions on zoonotic disease risk.

The World Organization for Animal Health (WOAH) and the World Health Organization (WHO), along with the Food and Agriculture Organization (FAO) and the United Nations Environment Programme (UNEP), promote coordinated approaches through the One Health framework, emphasizing cross-sectoral collaboration and risk-based management of wildlife trade. These efforts include the development of guidelines to assess and mitigate disease risks associated with wildlife trade and to strengthen surveillance and reporting systems across countries.

Despite increasing recognition of these risks, governance challenges remain, including differences in national regulatory capacity, gaps in enforcement, and the complexity of balancing public health, biodiversity conservation, and economic livelihoods. As a result, experts have called for more integrated and harmonized global approaches to managing wildlife trade and preventing the emergence of zoonotic diseases.

=== Disease control intervention ===
Planetary health studies have called for disease control intervention measures to be implemented at live animal markets in lieu of complete bans. These include proposals for "standardised global monitoring of water, sanitation, and hygiene (WASH) conditions", which the World Health Organization announced in April 2020 that it was developing as requirements for wet markets in general to open. Other proposals include less homogeneous policies that are specialized for local social, cultural, and financial factors, as well as new proposed rapid assessment tools for monitoring the hygiene and biosecurity of live animal stalls in markets.

== See also ==
- Global catastrophic risk – Hypothetical global-scale disaster risk
- Globalization and disease
- Pandemic prevention – Organization and management of preventive measures against pandemics
- Virgin soil epidemic – Worse effects of disease to populations with no prior exposure
- Wet market – Market selling perishable goods, including meat, produce, and food animals
