= Pat Nuttall =

British virologist and acarologist

Patricia (Pat) Anne Nuttall, OBE (born 1953) is a British virologist and acarologist known for her research on tick-borne diseases. Her discoveries include the fact that pathogens can be transmitted between vectors feeding on a host without being detectable in the host's blood. She is also a science administrator who served as the director of the Natural Environment Research Council (NERC) Centre for Ecology & Hydrology (2001–11). As of 2015, she is professor of arbovirology in the Department of Zoology of the University of Oxford.

== Education ==
Nuttall gained a BSc in microbiology at the University of Bristol in 1974. Her PhD in virology (1978), under the supervision of Jim Stott and C. Kaplan, was at the Institute for Animal Health (now the Pirbright Institute) and the University of Reading.

== Career ==
From 1977, Nuttall did post-doctoral research at the Edward Grey Institute of Field Ornithology of the Department of Zoology at the University of Oxford and the NERC Unit of Invertebrate Virology in Oxford. She remained at the NERC unit, which was renamed the Institute of Virology and Environmental Microbiology (IVEM), rising to be its director in 1996. In 2001, IVEM merged with other bodies to become the NERC Centre for Ecology & Hydrology, and Nuttall served as the centre's director until 2011. During this period she oversaw the major restructuring of the centre. She subsequently directed national projects with NERC. She chaired the Partnership for European Environmental Research from 2008 to 2010.

Nuttall has been professor of arbovirology in the Department of Zoology of the University of Oxford since 2013. She is a fellow of Wolfson College, Oxford.

== Research ==
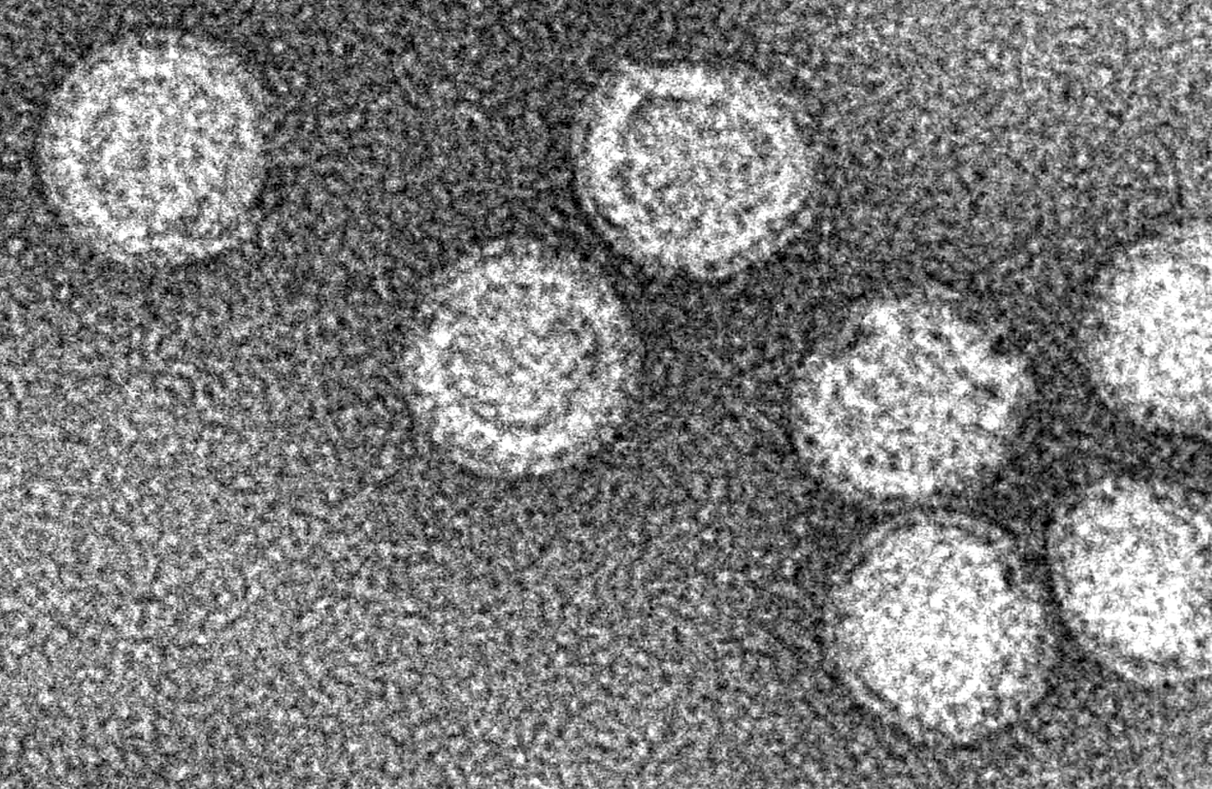
Electron micrograph of tick-borne encephalitis virus

Her early research was on the cattle disease, bovine viral diarrhoea. Nuttall found that the bovine viral diarrhoea virus was often present as a contaminant in foetal bovine serum, a commonly used laboratory reagent, a result that was published in Nature in 1977. She then worked with ornithologist Chris Perrins trying to identify the virus responsible for puffinosis, a disease that affects the Manx shearwater (Puffinus puffinus) sea bird. During this research, Nuttall visited sea-bird colonies and became interested in ticks, arthropods that often infest sea birds as well as other vertebrates, and can act as vectors for disease.

=== Nonsystemic transmission ===
In the early 1980s, Nuttall started to study viruses transmitted by ticks, initially focusing on orbiviruses, nairoviruses and thogotoviruses. While performing experiments designed to explore whether Thogoto virus, an influenza-like virus, can be transmitted between ticks during mating, Nuttall and her colleagues unexpectedly found that control ticks became infected. They discovered that the virus can be transmitted between infected and uninfected ticks when they feed simultaneously on apparently uninfected guinea pigs, without the virus being present at a detectable level in the blood. With Milan Labuda, Nuttall subsequently demonstrated the same phenomenon with tick-borne encephalitis virus, a better-understood arthropod-transmitted virus.

These results challenge the then-accepted idea that arthropod-transmitted viruses can only be transmitted when the arthropod vector feeds on an infected host in which the virus is replicating and circulating in the blood above a threshold level. Sarah Randolph comments:

Suddenly the conventional wisdom that systemic infections above a certain threshold level were necessary for transmission, and could therefore be used to assay host competence, was over-turned. Viraemia and even bacteraemia are now seen as an inconsistent, species-specific consequence of infection but not a necessary condition for transmission.

The phenomenon of nonviraemic or nonsystemic transmission turns out to be widespread – it has been subsequently observed with many other viruses transmitted by ticks, black flies and mosquitos, including major human pathogens such as West Nile virus, as well as other pathogens, including the spirochaete Borrelia burgdorferi, which causes Lyme disease. – and important in natural transmission. Nuttall's group has continued to study the phenomenon, and have shown that immunity to tick-borne encephalitis virus does not prevent nonsystemic transmission.

=== Tick saliva ===
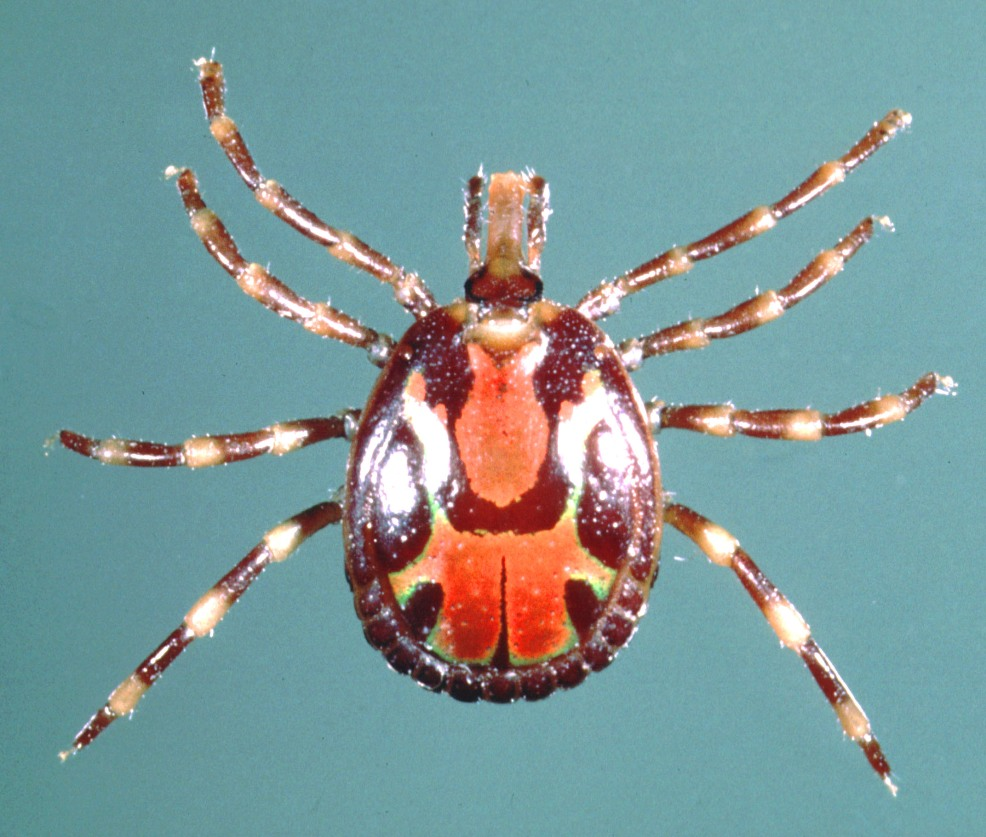
The tropical bont tick, whose saliva is the source of variegin

Nuttall's recent work has focused on discovering the function of tick saliva's many constituents, as well as the mechanisms by which tick-transmitted pathogens use them to enhance their transmission. Nuttall and colleagues were the first to show, in 1989, that tick saliva promotes the transmission of viruses, a phenomenon which they have called "saliva-assisted transmission"; this has been suggested as a mechanism for nonsystemic transmission. In 1998, she and her colleagues characterised three immunoglobulin-binding proteins, which were among the first proteins from tick saliva to be sequenced. With Norbert Fuchsberger, Valeria Hajnicka and others, Nuttall has shown that tick saliva suppresses the host's antiviral immune responses, including natural killer cell activity and the induction of type I interferon and cytokines involved in inflammation. Her group has also shown that the proteins in saliva differ between individual ticks of the same species and also change over the course of feeding.

=== Drugs and vaccines ===
Some components of tick saliva have potential as drugs to treat a range of conditions unrelated to tick disease. Nuttall comments that "These molecules have been refined by millions of years of evolution. There are no toxicity problems, they work on a range of animals, they aren't fragile — and there are an awful lot of them." For example, with Guido Paesen, Nuttall has characterised histamine-binding proteins that can suppress inflammation in humans by binding directly to histamine, rather than blocking its access to cell receptors, of which at least four are known. One of these proteins, rEV131, was investigated by NERC spin-off company Evolutec for the treatment of hay fever and for use in recovery from cataract surgery. Another example is the anticoagulant variegin, discovered by Nuttall and Maria Kazimirova in the tropical bont tick (Amblyomma variegatum), which represents a novel class of thrombin inhibitor; it has been shown to prevent venous thrombosis in a zebrafish model.

Tick saliva products are also possible targets for vaccines to control tick infestation and, potentially, to prevent the diseases they carry. One vaccine candidate explored by Nuttall's group is 64TRP, a 15 kDa Rhipicephalus appendiculatus protein from the cement cone that glues the tick's mouthparts to the host. Vaccination with 64TRP can protect against tick-borne encephalitis virus carried by a different type of tick, the castor bean tick (Ixodes ricinus), in a mouse model.

== Awards ==
Nuttall received the Ivanovsky Medal for Virology of the Russian Academy of Sciences in 1996. She was awarded the OBE in the 2000 New Year Honours List, for "services to Environmental Science and Policy."

== Selected publications ==
=== Books ===
- Nuttall PA; Bowman AS, eds. (2008), Ticks: Biology, Disease and Control, Cambridge University Press, ISBN 978-0-521-86761-0

=== Research papers ===
- Labuda M, Trimnell AR, Licková M, Kazimírová M, Davies GM, Lissina O, Hails RS, Nuttall PA (2006), "An anti-vector vaccine protects against a lethal vector-borne pathogen", PLOS Pathogens, 2 (4): e27, doi:10.1371/journal.ppat.0020027, PMC 1424664, PMID 16604154
- Paesen GC, Adams PL, Harlos K, Nuttall PA, Stuart DI (1999), "Tick histamine-binding proteins: Isolation, cloning, and three-dimensional structure", Molecular Cell, 3 (5): 661–71, doi:10.1016/s1097-2765(00)80359-7, PMID 10360182
- Wang H, Paesen GC, Nuttall PA, Barbour AG (1998), "Male ticks help their mates to feed", Nature, 391 (6669): 753–54, Bibcode:1998Natur.391..753W, doi:10.1038/35773, PMID 9486641, S2CID 4398008
- Labuda M, Kozuch O, Zuffová E, Elecková E, Hails RS, Nuttall PA (1997), "Tick-borne encephalitis virus transmission between ticks cofeeding on specific immune natural rodent hosts", Virology, 235 (1): 138–43, doi:10.1006/viro.1997.8622, PMID 9300045
- Jones LD, Hodgson E, Nuttall PA (1989), "Enhancement of virus transmission by tick salivary glands", Journal of General Virology, 70 (7): 1895–98, doi:10.1099/0022-1317-70-7-1895, PMID 2544668
- Jones LD, Davies CR, Steele GM, Nuttall PA (1987), "A novel mode of arbovirus transmission involving a nonviremic host", Science, 237 (4816): 775–77, Bibcode:1987Sci...237..775J, doi:10.1126/science.3616608, PMID 3616608
