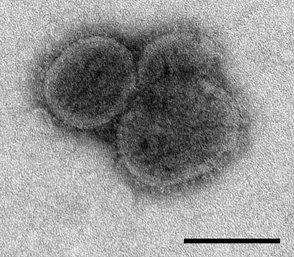
- Electron micrograph of Bourbon virus (scale bar: 100 nm)

Virus classification
- (unranked): Virus
- Realm: Riboviria
- Kingdom: Orthornavirae
- Phylum: Negarnaviricota
- Class: Insthoviricetes
- Order: Articulavirales
- Family: Orthomyxoviridae
- Genus: Thogotovirus

Species
- See text

Synonyms
- Thogoto-like viruses

= Thogotovirus =

Genus of viruses

Thogotovirus is a genus of enveloped RNA viruses in the virus family Orthomyxoviridae. Their single-stranded, negative-sense RNA genome has six or seven segments. Thogotoviruses are distinguished from most other orthomyxoviruses (Note: Members of the genus Quaranjavirus are also transmitted by ticks.) by being arboviruses – viruses that are transmitted by arthropods, in this case usually ticks. Thogotoviruses can replicate in both tick cells and vertebrate cells; one subtype has also been isolated from mosquitoes. A consequence of being transmitted by blood-sucking vectors is that the virus must spread systemically in the vertebrate host – unlike influenza viruses, which are transmitted by respiratory droplets and are usually confined to the respiratory system.

The genus contains eight species. A wide range of mammals are infected by members of the genus; some types also infect birds. THOV causes disease in livestock. THOV, DHOV and Bourbon virus can infect humans, and have occasionally been associated with human disease.

== History ==
Thogoto virus (THOV) and Dhori virus (DHOV) were identified in the early 1960s in Kenya and India, respectively. Two cases of human disease associated with THOV occurred in 1966, and a Russian laboratory accident in the 1980s showed that DHOV can also cause disease in humans. The two viruses were originally considered to be bunyaviruses, but characterisation in the 1980s and early 1990s revealed similarities with influenza viruses. A genus of "Thogoto-like viruses" within Orthomyxoviridae was proposed in 1995, and recognised by the ICTV under the name Thogotovirus the following year. The name comes from Thogoto Forest in Kenya, where THOV was first discovered. Since then, sequence analysis of five viruses discovered in the 1960–70s but unclassified or tentatively assigned to Bunyaviridae led to their being proposed as additional members of the genus. A further proposed member of the genus was characterised by next-generation sequencing in 2014.

== Virology ==
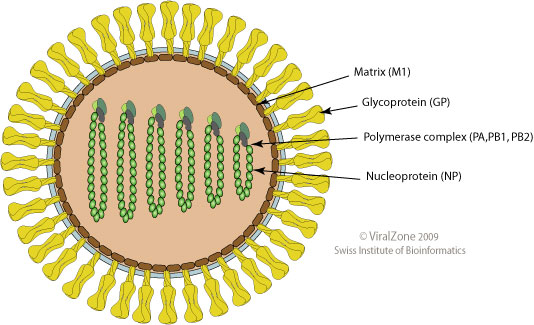
Schematic drawing of a virion (genera Thogotovirus and Quaranjavirus, cross section)

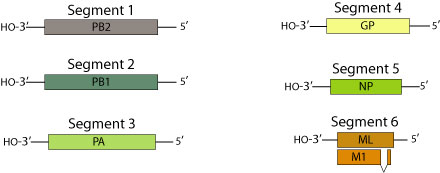
Thogotovirus genome map

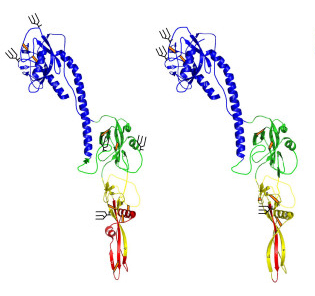
Predicted structure of THOV glycoprotein (left) compared with GP64 of the baculovirus, Autographa californica multicapsid nucleopolyhedrovirus (right)

The virus particle is enveloped. It is generally spherical or ovoid, with a diameter in the range 80–120 nm. Some filamentous forms are observed in THOV, Batken and Bourbon viruses. The single-stranded, –RNA genome is linear and segmented, with six or seven segments of 0.9–2.3 kb and a total size of around 10 kb. Reassortment of segments between strains has been observed in both ticks and mammals experimentally infected with more than one thogotovirus, but its significance in natural infections is unknown.

=== Viral proteins ===
The genome encodes 7–9 proteins, including the trimeric RNA polymerase enzyme (PA, PB1, PB2) and the structural proteins nucleoprotein (NP), which binds the viral genome; matrix protein (M1), which lines the envelope; and an envelope glycoprotein (GP), which acts as the virus receptor.

The thogotovirus glycoprotein is not similar to the influenza virus glycoproteins (haemagglutinin and neuraminidase), and instead shows some similarities with the gp64 glycoprotein of baculoviruses, which infect insects. It also has some similarity with the haemagglutinin of Quaranfil virus of the related genus of tick-transmitted orthomyxoviruses Quaranjavirus. The mechanism by which thogotoviruses gained a baculovirus-like glycoprotein is unknown. Pat Nuttall and colleagues have speculated that the acquisition enabled these viruses to infect ticks. This apparent receptor specificity for arthropod cells does not prevent most thogotoviruses from infecting vertebrates. The thogotovirus glycoprotein is classified as a class III or γ penetrene, lacking the fusion peptide present in influenza haemagglutinin (a class I or α penetrene).

THOV and JOSV also encode the protein M-long (ML), which counters the host's innate immunity, in particular by suppressing the production of interferon. This immune evasion is important for the virus to infect systemically in vertebrates, but is unnecessary in arthropods, which lack the interferon response. The mechanism of action of ML is completely different from the equivalent protein in influenza viruses (NS1).

As in all orthomyxoviruses, the largest three segments (1–3) encode the three subunits of the RNA polymerase. In thogotoviruses, segment 4 encodes the glycoprotein and segment 5 the nucleoprotein. The messenger RNA (mRNA) from segment 6 can be spliced to encode the matrix protein or unspliced to encode ML, which has 38 additional amino acids at its C-terminus. No product has yet been identified for the seventh segment, observed in DHOV.

=== Life cycle ===
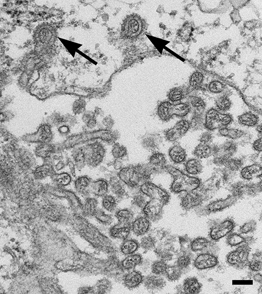
Electron micrograph showing endocytosis (arrows) of Bourbon virus (scale bar: 100 nm)

The receptor on the vertebrate host cell is sialic acid, which is bound by the viral glycoprotein. Entry is by endocytosis, with fusion of the viral and cell membranes occurring once the vesicle is acidified. In common with other orthomyxoviruses, viral transcription and replication both occur in the cell nucleus. In some members of the genus, replication has been shown to be sensitive to the Mx1/MxA protein, which is induced in mice and humans in response to interferon. In one study, this inhibitory effect was shown to be caused by MxA preventing the transport of the THOV genome into the nucleus.

As orthomyxoviruses do not encode a capping enzyme, initiation of transcription involves the virus cutting the cap off the 5′-end of host mRNAs, so that the mRNA is recognised by the host translation machinery. A similar "cap snatching" process is used by other orthomyxoviruses, but a much longer host RNA sequence is cleaved along with the cap and incorporated into the viral mRNA.

The virus assembles by the cell membrane and leaves the cell by budding. For THOV grown in baby hamster kidney cells, virus particles start to be released 6–8 hours after infection, with substantial quantities still being produced 24 hours after infection. This growth rate is slower than that of influenza viruses, and is more similar to Quaranfil virus.

== Epidemiology ==
Most thogotoviruses have been shown to infect arthropods, generally hard or soft ticks, which are arachnids, but in one case mosquitoes, which are insects. Members also infect birds and a wide range of wild and domestic mammals, including marsupials, rodents, hares, mongoose, horses, camels, goats, sheep and cattle. Three types – THOV, DHOV and Bourbon virus – have been shown to infect humans. They have a wide geographical range.

Transmission to vertebrates usually occurs via a tick vector. THOV persists in the tick, remaining in the organism as it goes through its developmental stages; this is called transstadial transmission. The virus can be transmitted to another host within a day of attachment to the host. THOV can be transmitted between ticks when they feed simultaneously on apparently uninfected guinea pigs, in the absence of a detectable level of virus in the blood. Such nonviraemic transmission has also been observed with other predominantly tick-transmitted RNA viruses, including bluetongue, Crimean–Congo haemorrhagic fever, louping ill, tick-borne encephalitis, vesicular stomatitis virus and West Nile virus viruses. Transmission of DHOV by respiratory aerosol has also been observed.

== Host interaction and disease ==
=== Ticks ===
No major pathological changes are observed in Rhipicephalus appendiculatus ticks infected with THOV. The virus is concentrated in the synganglion (the tick brain) early on in the blood-feeding process, with the proportion of virus located in the salivary glands increasing during the late phase of blood-feeding. Lower levels of virus are found in the trachea, digestive tract and female sex organs, but not in the male sex organs or the excretory system. The high level of virus present in the synganglion has been proposed to help the virus persist through the metamorphosis of the tick, as the nervous system undergoes less remodeling than other systems.

=== Vertebrates ===
In the laboratory setting, several members of the genus cause severe disease in mice and hamsters. Systemic spread of the virus occurs, with pathological effects present in multiple organs and systems, including the brain, liver, lymphatic system, and sometimes the lungs and small intestine. Lymphocytes are a major target cell for DHOV. DHOV infection in mice resembles experimental influenza infection in mice and ferrets as well as fatal H5N1 influenza infection of humans, and has been proposed as a model for this disease.

Natural infections with thogotoviruses in mammals generally do not appear to result in symptoms. THOV is a significant veterinary pathogen, for example, causing a febrile illness and abortion in sheep. As of February 2015, only eight cases of human disease associated with thogotoviruses have been reported: two with THOV, five with DHOV and one with Bourbon virus; there have been two fatalities. The incubation period for THOV is 4–5 days. All three viruses were associated with fever. THOV and DHOV also caused neurological symptoms: meningitis and neuromyelitis optica in the case of THOV; encephalitis in the case of DHOV. Hepatitis has been observed with THOV. The single case of disease in a person infected with Bourbon virus was associated with decreases in blood platelets and white cells; no neurological symptoms were observed. Influenza-like respiratory symptoms have not been reported.

== Treatment and prevention ==
No specific treatment or vaccine is available for thogotoviruses, as of February 2015. The antiviral drug ribavirin, which has a broad spectrum of activity that includes some other orthomyxoviruses, has been shown to inhibit DHOV replication in vitro in a single study. Supportive therapy is used for THOV disease, and has been recommended by the US Centers for Disease Control and Prevention for infection with Bourbon virus. As with other arboviruses, avoidance of contact with the vector is central to prevention.

== Species and strains ==
The genus contains the following species, listed by scientific name and followed by the exemplar virus of the species:

- Thogotovirus bourbonense, Bourbon virus
- Thogotovirus dhoriense, Dhori virus
- Thogotovirus josense, Jos virus
- Thogotovirus ozense, Oz virus
- Thogotovirus sinuense, Sinu virus
- Thogotovirus thailandense, Thailand tick thogotovirus
- Thogotovirus thogotoense, Thogoto virus
- Thogotovirus upoluense, Upolu virus

Species/strain	RNA segments	Diameter (nm)	Vectors	Vertebrate hosts	Distribution
Araguari	6	105	Unknown	Gray four-eyed opossum, mouse	S. America
Aransas Bay	6	75–140	Ornithodoros ticks	Mouse	N. America
Batken		50–100	Hyalomma ticks, Aedes and Culex mosquitoes	Chicken, hamster, mouse	Asia
Bourbon	≥6	~100–130	Amblyomma ticks	Human	N. America
Dhori	7		Hyalomma ticks	Birds, hare, horse, human, mouse, ruminants	Africa, Asia, Europe
Jos	≥6	85–120	Amblyomma and Rhipicephalus ticks	Mouse, zebu	Africa
Thogoto	6	100	Amblyomma, Hyalomma and Rhipicephalus ticks	Banded mongoose, donkey, human, rodents, ruminants	Africa, Asia, Europe
Upolu	6	75–120	Ornithodoros ticks	Mouse	Australia

=== THOV-like viruses ===
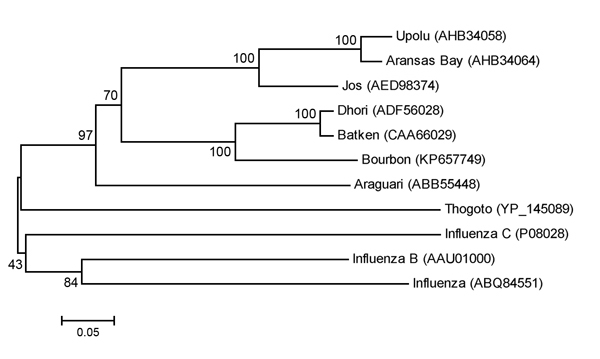
Phylogeny of selected orthomyxoviruses, based on the nucleocapsid protein (scale bar: amino acid substitutions per site)

==== Thogoto virus (THOV) ====
THOV was first isolated from ticks gathered from cattle in the Thogoto Forest region of Kenya, near Nairobi, in 1960, it is now known to be distributed across the African continent, and has also been found in Italy and Portugal in Europe, and Iran in the Middle East. Despite this wide geographical range, the virus shows only limited variation. Its vectors include various hard-bodied ticks, including Amblyomma, Hyalomma and Rhipicephalus species.

Antibodies have been found to THOV in rats and many domestic animals, including goats, sheep, donkeys, camels, cattle and buffaloes, and the virus has been isolated from the wild banded mongoose (Mongos mungo). It causes significant livestock disease, including a febrile illness and abortion in sheep. In artificial laboratory infections, it is highly pathogenic in hamsters and also infects mice. The virus is known to infect humans in natural settings.

The virus particle is generally spherical with some filamentous forms; the diameter is around 100 nm. The genome has six RNA segments.

==== Araguari virus ====
The Araguari virus was first isolated from a Gray four-eyed opossum (Philander opossum) in Serra do Navio, Amapá, Brazil in 1969. Its method of transmission is unknown. In laboratory infections, it is pathogenic to mice. The virion is around 105 nm in diameter. The genome has six RNA segments. Based on partial sequence data the virus was found to be most closely related to THOV.

==== Aransas Bay virus (ABV) ====
ABV was found in the soft-bodied tick genus Ornithodoros in seabird nests in southern Texas, USA, in 1975; it was the first member of the genus to be found in North America. No natural vertebrate host has been identified, but the virus is highly pathogenic to mice in laboratory infections. The virus particle is spherical or ovoid, with a range of sizes, from 75 nm × 85 nm to 120 nm × 140 nm. The genome has six RNA segments. It is most similar to UPOV, with some similarity to THOV and JOSV.

==== Jos virus (JOSV) ====
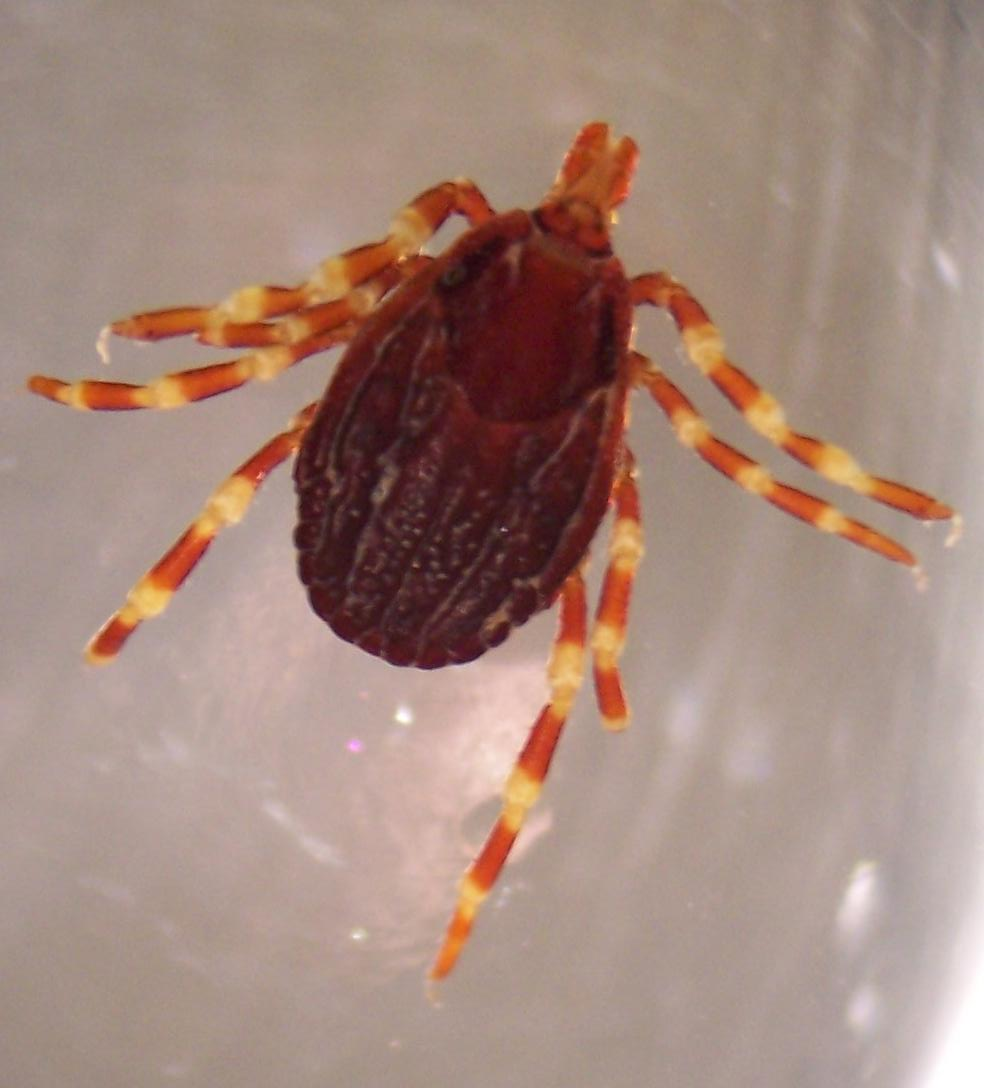
Hyalomma marginatum is one of the vectors of DHOV

JOSV was first isolated from the zebu (Bos indicus) in Jos, Nigeria in 1967. It has since been found infecting Amblyomma and Rhipicephalus hard-bodied ticks in several countries across Africa. In the laboratory it causes severe pathology in mice. The virus particle has a variable, usually ovoid, morphology with a diameter of 85–120 nm. The genome contains at least six RNA segments. It has some sequence similarities with UPOV and ABV.

==== Upolu virus (UPOV) ====
UPOV was first isolated on Upolu Cay in the Great Barrier Reef, Australia in 1966, from soft-bodied ticks of the species Ornithodoros capensis associated with the sooty tern (Onychoprion fuscatus). No natural vertebrate host has been identified, but the virus is highly pathogenic to mice in laboratory infections. The virion can either be spherical, with a diameter in the range 75–95 nm, or slightly ovoid, with a range of dimensions from 75 nm × 85 nm to 105 nm × 120 nm. The genome has six RNA segments. It is most similar to ABV, with some similarity to THOV and JOSV.

=== DHOV-like viruses ===
==== Dhori virus (DHOV) ====
DHOV was first isolated from Hyalomma dromedarii hard-bodied ticks infesting camels in Gujarat, India, in 1961. It has since been observed in eastern Russia, Pakistan, Egypt, Saudi Arabia, Kenya and southern Portugal. The vector is usually a species of Hyalomma, such as H. marginatum.

Where DHOV is prevalent, antibodies to the virus have been documented in camels, goats, horses, cattle and humans. The virus has been isolated from a wild hare, Lepus europaeus. DHOV can infect humans by the aerosol route after accidental laboratory exposure, causing a febrile illness and encephalitis. Under laboratory conditions it is highly pathogenic for mice, and has been proposed as a model system for highly pathogenic influenza. It has also been shown to infect birds, with the virus being isolated from a cormorant, and antibodies being observed in waterfowl.

DHOV has seven RNA segments.

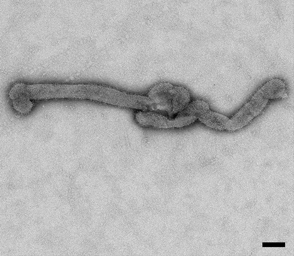
Electron micrograph of a filamentous form of Bourbon virus (scale bar: 100 nm)

==== Batken virus ====
Batken virus was first isolated from hard-bodied ticks of the species Hyalomma plumbeum plumbeum infesting sheep near the town of Batken, Kirghizia, now in Kyrgyzstan, in 1970. It has also been found to infect mosquitoes of the species Aedes caspius Pallas and Culex hortensis Ficalbi, also in Kyrgyzstan. Its geographical range is limited to Central Asia, Transcaucasia and the area to the north of the Caspian Sea. In the laboratory it is highly pathogenic for mice, hamsters and chickens. The virion is variable in shape, with spherical and filamentous forms being observed; it has a diameter of 50–100 nm. Batken is considered a DHOV subtype; the viruses have a high degree of sequence identity (90% in the envelope glycoprotein; 96–98% in other proteins), and their antibodies crossreact.

==== Bourbon virus ====
Bourbon virus was identified in 2014 by next-generation sequencing of a blood sample from a man from Bourbon County, Kansas, USA, who became ill a few days after being bitten by multiple ticks, and subsequently died. It is the only known thogotovirus to be associated with human disease in the Western Hemisphere. As of February 2015, Bourbon virus has not been isolated from ticks, insects or non-human vertebrates. The virus is variable in shape, with filamentous as well as spherical forms; it has a diameter broadly in the range 100–130 nm. The genome contains at least six RNA segments. It is most similar to DHOV and Batken virus.

==== Oz virus ====
Oz virus was first characterised in 2018 after isolation from the hard tick Amblyomma testudinarium in Ehime, Japan. [DOI: 10.1016/j.virusres.2018.03.004]. The first human case, a 70-year-old female patient who died of myocarditis with isolation of Oz virus on autopsy, was reported on 23.6.2023 by the Japanese Ministry of Heath.
