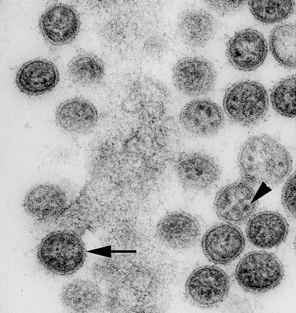
- Cygnet River virus

Virus classification
- (unranked): Virus
- Realm: Riboviria
- Kingdom: Orthornavirae
- Phylum: Negarnaviricota
- Class: Insthoviricetes
- Order: Articulavirales
- Family: Orthomyxoviridae
- Genus: Quaranjavirus

Species
- See text

= Quaranjavirus =

Genus of viruses

Quaranjavirus is a genus of enveloped RNA viruses, one of seven genera in the virus family Orthomyxoviridae. The genome is single-stranded, negative-sense segmented RNA, generally with six segments. The genus contains six species. Quaranjaviruses predominantly infect arthropods and birds; Quaranfil quaranjavirus is the only member of the genus to have been shown to infect humans. The Quaranfil and Johnston Atoll viruses are transmitted between vertebrates by ticks, resembling members of Thogotovirus, another genus of Orthomyxoviridae.

== History ==
Quaranfil virus was first isolated from humans in Egypt in 1953. Johnston Atoll virus and Lake Chad virus were first isolated from birds in 1964 and 1969, respectively. In 1989, based on the appearance of the virus particles under the electron microscope, H.G. Zeller and colleagues suggested that they should be classified as arenaviruses, but this was not accepted by the International Committee on Taxonomy of Viruses (ICTV). In 2009, based on sequence data and the structure of the virus particles, Rachel Presti and colleagues suggested that the three viruses should be classified as a new genus of orthomyxoviruses, originally named "Quarjavirus". Multiple other viruses have subsequently been suggested as genus members. The genus was formally proposed to the ICTV in 2012, under the name '"Quaranjavirus", and formally approved by that body in 2013.

== Nomenclature ==
Quaranfil virus is named for Quaranfil, one of the villages near Cairo from which the virus was isolated. The Johnston Atoll virus is named for Johnston Atoll in the Pacific, also where the virus was first isolated. The genus name combines "Quaran", with "ja" for Johnston Atoll.

== Virology ==
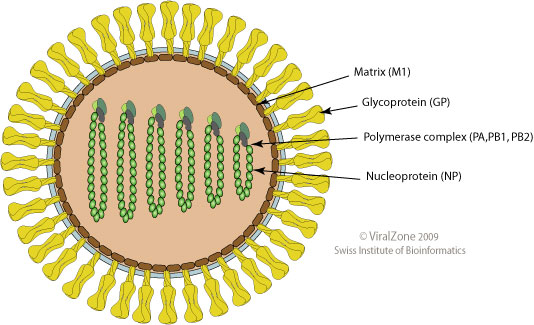
Schematic drawing of a virion (genera Thogotovirus and Quaranjavirus, cross section)

The virus particle is enveloped and spherical, ovoid or variable in shape, with a diameter generally in the range 80–120 nm. The virus particle contains around ten ribosome-like granules, a feature of arenaviruses. It bears surface projections variously described as 4–5 nm long and 10–14 nm in length and 4–6 nm in diameter.

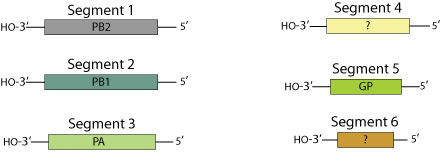
Quaranjavirus genome map

The single-stranded, –RNA genome is linear and segmented, generally with six segments of 0.9–2.4 kb and a total size of around 11.5 kb. Wellfleet Bay virus has a seventh segment of 519 nucleotides. The genome encodes six or (in Wellfleet Bay virus) seven proteins. The PA, PB1 and PB2 subunits of the trimeric RNA polymerase enzyme are encoded by the three largest segments (1–3), as in other orthomyxoviruses. Segment 5 encodes the envelope glycoprotein (GP). Proteins of unknown function are encoded by segments 4 and 6, which have recently been tentatively assigned to the viral nucleoprotein and matrix protein, respectively. Segment 7 of Wellfleet Bay virus encodes an additional protein of unknown function. The quaranjavirus glycoprotein shows no similarity with the influenza virus glycoproteins (haemagglutinin and neuraminidase), and instead shows some similarities with the gp64 glycoprotein of baculoviruses, which infect insects, as well as the glycoprotein of thogotoviruses, a genus of tick-transmitted orthomyxoviruses.

The replication cycle of Quaranfil virus takes around 24–36 hours, which is comparable with thogotoviruses and slower than influenza viruses.

== Host range and disease ==
Quaranjaviruses infect both arthropod and vertebrate hosts. The most common arthropod hosts are species of soft-bodied (Argasidae family) ticks. Most members cannot infect mosquito cell lines in the laboratory. In 2015, multiple new members of the genus were proposed based on RNA sequences obtained from mosquitos, flies, other insects, and the Neoscona spider.

Aquatic birds that nest in colonies are the most common vertebrate hosts, including gannets, terns and herons. Cygnet River and Wellfleet Bay viruses have been associated with an often-fatal disease in farmed and wild duck species, with symptoms including diarrhoea and lethargy. Most genus members tested can infect mice under laboratory conditions; they cause severe pathology and are frequently lethal. Quaranfil virus is the only member of the genus to have been shown to infect humans; infection generally appears to be asymptomatic and has occasionally been reported to be associated with mild fever.

== Species and strains ==
The genus contains the following species, listed by scientific name and followed by the exemplar virus of the species:

- Quaranjavirus araguariense, Araguari virus
- Quaranjavirus chadense, Lake Chad virus
- Quaranjavirus johnstonense, Johnston Atoll virus
- Quaranjavirus quaranfilense, Quaranfil virus
- Quaranjavirus tyulekense, Tyulek virus
- Quaranjavirus wellfleetense, Wellfleet Bay virus

Many other species or strains have been identified from a range of arthropods based on RNA data.

Species/strain	RNA segments	Diameter (nm)	Vectors	Vertebrate hosts	Distribution	Ref.
Cygnet River				Muscovy duck	Australia	
Johnston Atoll		165–200	Ornithodoros ticks	Chicken, mouse	Australasia, Pacific	
Lake Chad				Mouse, vitelline masked weaver bird	Africa	
Quaranfil	≥6	100 or 137–156	Argas ticks	Mouse, human, seabirds	Africa, Asia	
Tyulek	6		Argas ticks		Asia	
Wellfleet Bay	≥7	90–110		Common eider	North America	

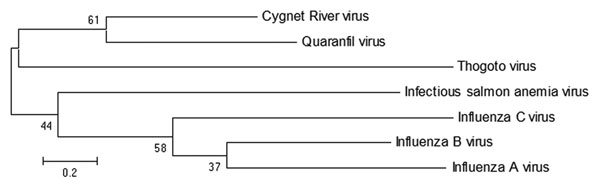
Phylogenic tree showing Quaranfil virus, Cygnet River virus and selected orthomyxoviruses, based on the matrix protein

=== Quaranfil virus and related strains ===
Quaranfil virus was initially isolated in 1953 from two children with mild fever in the villages of Quaranfil and Sindbis, near Cairo in Egypt. Antibodies to the virus have been demonstrated in around 8% of people sampled in the area, although no further cases of symptomatic disease have been reported. The geographical range of the virus is wide, also including Nigeria and South Africa in Africa, and Afghanistan, Iraq, Iran, Kuwait and Yemen in the Middle East and Asia. The virus has also been isolated from seabirds and from ticks, such as the soft-bodied Argas arboreus. The virus has been shown to be transmitted between vertebrates by ticks. In the laboratory, it causes severe disease in mice.

==== Cygnet River and Wellfleet Bay virus ====
Cygnet River virus was isolated in 2010 from embryonated eggs of the Muscovy duck (Cairina moschate) from Cygnet River, Kangaroo Island in Australia. The virus was associated with an outbreak of severe disease in farmed ducks.

Wellfleet Bay virus was isolated from wild common eider ducks (Somateria mollissima) overwintering at Jeremy Point, Wellfleet Bay in Cape Cod, Massachusetts, USA. The virus was associated with an outbreak of severe disease in 2010, and is hypothesised to have been a factor in a series of similar outbreaks in 1998–2013.

The two viruses are closely related and might be strains of the same virus; they are also related to Quaranfil virus.

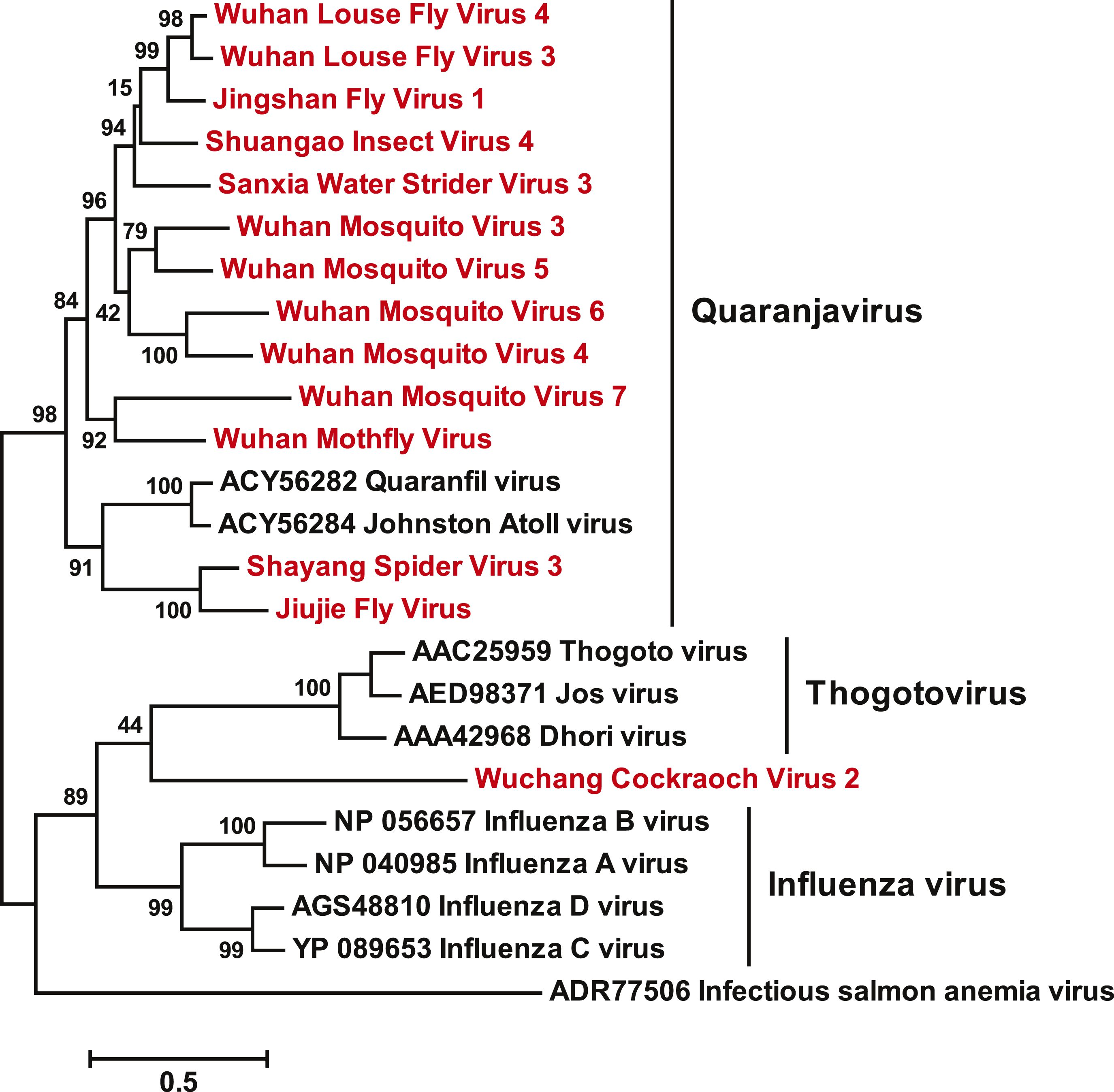
Phylogenic tree showing Quaranfil virus, Johnston Atoll virus, putative arthropod strains (red) and selected orthomyxoviruses

==== Lake Chad virus ====
Lake Chad virus was isolated in 1969 from a vitelline masked weaver bird (Ploceus vitellinus) from Lake Chad in Nigeria, and has yet to be isolated elsewhere. The virus causes severe disease in mice under laboratory conditions. It is most closely related to Quaranfil virus.

=== Johnston Atoll virus ===
Johnston Atoll virus was first isolated in 1964 from soft-bodied Ornithodoros capensis ticks infesting the brown noddy tern (Anous stolidus) from Sand Island, Johnston Atoll, in the Pacific. Its range also includes Hawaii, Australia and New Zealand. The virus has been shown to be transmitted between vertebrates by ticks. In the laboratory, it causes severe disease in mice and chicks.

=== Tyulek virus ===
Tyulek virus was isolated from soft-bodied Argas vulgaris ticks infesting birds by the Aksu River near the village of Tyulek in Kyrgyzstan. The virus is closely related to both Quaranfil and 'ohnston Atoll viruses.

=== Other putative strains ===
Thirteen RNA sequences with 34–40% sequence identity to Johnston Atoll virus have been identified in insects and spiders in China. Putative hosts include Neoscona nautica (spider), Atherigona orientalis (pepper fruit fly), Chrysomya megacephala (oriental latrine fly), Sarcophaga (flesh flies), Musca domestica (housefly), Culex tritaeniorhynchus, C. quinquefasciatus, Anopheles sinensis and Armigeres subalbatus (mosquitoes), Psychoda alternata (moth fly), Hippoboscoidea (louse fly), as well as unidentified species in the Tabanidae (horse-fly), Gerridae (water strider) and Stratiomyidae (soldier fly) groups. Nearly 50 viruses associated with Orthomyxoviridae were identified in a broad variety of insect hosts, after computational virus screening of the largest insect transcriptome collection sampled worldwide. Orthomyxoviridae-related viruses were found for the first time in insect hosts, such as Raphidioptera, Dermaptera, Archaeognatha, Neuroptera, Phasmatodea, Zygentoma, and Lepidoptera. These findings place Quaranjavirus in a paraphyletic position to the other viruses of Orthomyxoviridae with implications for taxonomic evaluations and virus evolution.
