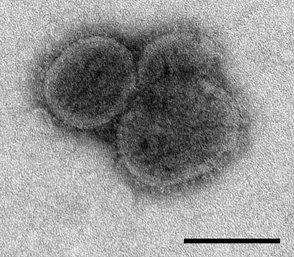
- An electron micrograph of the spherical form of Bourbon virus (scale bar: 100 nm)

Virus classification
- (unranked): Virus
- Realm: Riboviria
- Kingdom: Orthornavirae
- Phylum: Negarnaviricota
- Class: Insthoviricetes
- Order: Articulavirales
- Family: Orthomyxoviridae
- Genus: Thogotovirus
- Species: Thogotovirus bourbonense

= Bourbon virus =

Species of virus

Bourbon virus is a tick-associated virus in the genus Thogotovirus of the family Orthomyxoviridae, which is similar to Dhori virus and Batken virus. Its genome consists of six segments of single stranded, negative-sense RNA. It was first identified in 2014 in a man from Bourbon County, Kansas, United States, who died after being bitten by ticks. The case is the eighth report of human disease associated with a thogotovirus globally, and the first in the Western Hemisphere. The lone star tick (Amblyomma americanum) is believed to play an important role in transmitting the virus to humans.

Relatively little is known about the virus, however it is primarily vectored by ticks. No specific treatment or vaccine is specifically approved for Bourbon virus infection, however some experimental treatments in mice models have seen varying levels of success. Avoidance of tick bites is recommended to reduce the risk of infection. The virus presents similarly to other tick-borne viruses and some cases likely go undiagnosed. Individuals infected with the Bourbon virus may experience symptoms such as fever, headaches, muscle pain, fatigue, nausea, and skin rashes.

== Discovery ==
The Bourbon virus (BRBV) was discovered in 2014 following the hospitalization of a man over the age of 50 from Bourbon County, Kansas. Doctors initially suspected a tick-borne illness because of his exposure history and symptoms. The patient was given doxycycline to treat the suspected tick-borne illness, but his symptoms of malaise, anorexia, and fever worsened. He had blood testing that showed his low number of white blood cells and platelets were due to acute bone marrow suppression. The patient continued to suffer and show no signs of improvement, causing doctors to withdraw further care, the patient died shortly after, only 11 days after the onset of symptoms. This unexplained illness prompted doctors to do additional investigation.

Heartland virus was suspected based on the symptoms, prompting further testing of the patient's blood and serum. The blood and serum were then sent to the CDC where the Bourbon virus was discovered by researchers Olga Kosoy, Amy Lambert, and colleagues from the Centers for Disease Control and Prevention (CDC) in Fort Collins, Colorado. To identify the unknown pathogen, they used viral isolation techniques and next-generation sequencing. Results ruled out Heartland viral RNA and antibodies, but while testing for the virus, heterologous viral plaques were found. Further negative staining and electron microscopy confirmed pleomorphic viral particles of viruses with links to the Orthomyxoviridae family. The researchers found orthomyxoviral RNA present in the blood and nucleotide sequences identifying with the Dhori virus, another tick-borne illness.

=== Laboratory identification and classification ===
In the cell culture results, substantial cytopathic effects were observed three days after inoculation with the patient's blood or serum. The plaques did not resemble those produced by the Heartland virus, leading researchers to suspect that they were the work of another virus. Recently developed "next-generation" sequencing techniques were employed to find novel viral RNA sequences in cell culture supernatants. Real-time reverse transcription–polymerase chain reaction was used to confirm that the newly identified viral RNA was present in the patient's blood sample and serum specimens.

The analysis placed the BRBV in the Thogotovirus genus, with a close relationship to Oz and Dhori viruses. BRBV's open reading frame results showed about 59% to about 82% of shared sequence identity to the Oz and Dhori viruses. The differences were found in the glycoprotein, while the PB1 gene showed the highest similarity. A 2015 study by Lambert and colleagues worked on further examining the Bourbon virus through genetic and antibody based testing. The researchers discovered amino acid sequence identities ranging from 24% to 82% when comparing BRBV to other thogotoviruses, along with little serological cross-reactivity. These findings provided researchers additional evidence that the BRBV was a distinct member of the genus.

=== Significance of the discovery ===
The discovery of the Bourbon virus identified a previously unrecognized human-assocated Thogotovirus in North America, expanding the known geographic distribution of these viruses. Before the discovery, Thogotoviruses associated with human illness had primarily been documented in other parts of the world. Its identification raised concerns that tick-borne viral infections may be more common than previously recognized. The discovery in Kansas demonstrated the importance of advanced genetic testing in identifying previously unrecognized pathogens, highlighting the need for further research into the virus's transmission and health impact on human health.

== Virology ==
=== Structure and morphology ===
Bourbon virus is a type of thogotovirus, which is in the RNA virus family Orthomyxoviridae. The virus particles show different morphologies, including filamentous and roughly spherical forms, and have nucleoprotein and glycoprotein projections from the surface. The spherical virions have a range of diameters, with broadly 100–130 nm being common. Virus was present at high levels in the extracellular space, with occasional particles being observed in the process of endocytosis.

Glycoprotein molecules project from the viral envelope and are thought to help the virus attach to host cells and fuse with cell membranes. A crystallographic study of the Bourbon virus glycoprotein found that hit adopts a post fusion structure with features of a class III viral fusion protein. The protein forms a trimer, and its conserved fusion-loop region is thought to participate in membrane fusion. Proposed models suggest that Bourbon virus enters the cells through endocytosis. Acidification inside the endosome may then trigger the glycoprotein to help the viral envelope fuse with the endosomal membrane. These entry details as well as proposed roles of the matrix proteins in moving viral components from the nucleus and in the virus assembly and release have not been directly established for Bourbon virus, they are inferred from available evidence and research on related Thogotoviruses and Dhori viruses.

=== Genome and viral proteins ===
Its genome consists of six segments of single-stranded, negative-sense RNA, with a total length of about 10–11 kb. Like other members of the Orthomyxoviridae it is segmented or divided into several separate pieces. The genome segments are associated with nucleoprotein in ribonucleoprotein complexes. It has at least six segments which include glycoprotein (GP), nucleoprotein (NP), matrix protein (MP), polymerase acidic protein (PA), polymerase basic protein 1 (PB1), and polymerase basic protein 2 (PB2). These genome segments help describe how the virus is organized and which proteins are important to its structure and replication. Three of the structural proteins – glycoprotein, nucleoprotein, and matrix protein – were detected in purified virus preparations, with approximate molecular masses of 60, 52, and 30 kDa, respectively. Its glycoprotein is encoded by genome segment 4, nucleoprotein by segment 5, and matrix by segment 6.

During genome replication, the viral polymerase protein is thought to make a full length, positive-sense complementary RNA (cRNA) intermediate, which is then copied to produce new negative-sense viral RNA. The polymerase also makes viral messenger RNA using a process called cap-snatching, in which it uses a capped fragment of host-cell RNA to initiate transcription.

=== Related Thogotoviruses ===
The Bourbon virus is most similar in RNA sequence to Dhori virus and the closely related Batken virus, both members of the genus Thogotovirus, but has diverged substantially from these viruses. Dhori and Batken viruses have only been reported in the Eastern hemisphere. This relationship helps place Bourbon virus within the larger Thogotovirus family while showing how distinctive it is from the other members within the group.

Thogotoviruses rarely cause disease in humans. The case in Bourbon County is only the eighth report of human disease associated with a thogotovirus globally. Thogotovirus caused disease in two people from Nigeria, one of whom died. Dhori virus caused disease in five laboratory workers infected accidentally. Although another member of the genus Thogotovirus, Aransas Bay virus, has been found in seabird-associated ticks in the United States, the 2014 case in Bourbon County is the first reported case of human disease apparently associated with a thogotovirus in the Western hemisphere.

== Epidemiology ==
The Bourbon virus was first identified in a previously healthy man aged more than 50 years from Bourbon County, Kansas, United States, who worked as a farmer. He died in June 2014. Dana Hawkinson from the University of Kansas Hospital, where the patient was treated, has speculated that the virus had been previously present undetected. There have been five confirmed cases since 2014. More recent serological testing in the region has revealed that the true number of cases is likely underreported. An article published in 2024 found 3 of 440 (0.7%) of people tested positive for Bourbon virus antibodies in Missouri and 4 of 518 (0.8%) of people tested positive for the antibodies in North Carolina. These findings suggest that Bourbon virus infections may be occurring in states without existing confirmed cases, and at higher rates.

The CDC is developing investigational diagnostic tests for Bourbon virus infection. In December 2014, CDC and the Kansas Department of Health and Environment were planning to test blood samples from people in Kansas who have recently experienced similar unexplained symptoms. Serological testing conducted in mammals in the regions where the virus has been identified have revealed that several mammalian species tested positive for Bourbon virus antibodies, suggesting that local wildlife serve as vectors and can be infected as well. Species that tested positive included domestic dogs, eastern cottontail rabbits, horses, raccoons, and white-tailed deer. Another study published in 2025 conducted in Missouri found that bobcats, red foxes, and coyotes also contained Bourbon virus antibodies through serological testing.

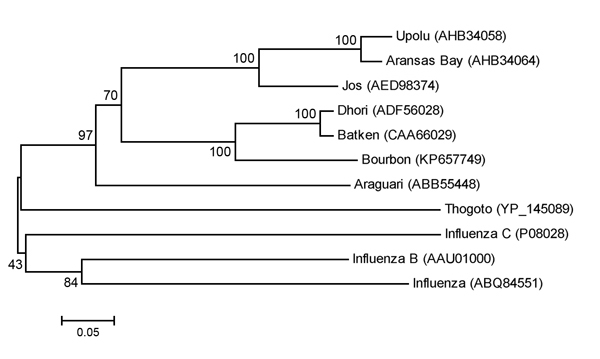
Phylogeny of selected orthomyxoviruses, based on the nucleocapsid protein (scale bar: amino acid substitutions per site)

The case patient reported multiple tick bites, including a blood-filled tick in the shoulder area that was observed a few days before the onset of symptoms. The virus is known to be tick-borne, and has been isolated in lone star ticks. A study performed in 2022 also detected the virus in populations of the Asian longhorned tick. Most thogotoviruses are transmitted solely by ticks, but the similar Batken virus has also been isolated from mosquitoes. A 2023 study was conducted to determine the prevalence of the bourbon virus within lone-star tick populations in St. Louis County, Missouri. Researchers collected 2,778 ticks across 8 different locations before assigning them into 355 groups, 14 (3.9%) of which tested positive for the bourbon virus RNA sequence.

== Signs and symptoms ==
In the index case, the patient had high fever, headache, decreased appetite, muscle aches, joint pain, fatigue, malaise, nausea, vomiting, diarrhea, and a maculopapular rash on the abdomen, chest, and back. Late in the course of the illness, he experienced shortness of breath, which developed into acute respiratory distress syndrome. He died from multiple organ failure 11 days after the earliest symptoms.

Laboratory abnormalities observed included a decrease in the patient's white cell and platelet counts, considered to be caused by bone marrow suppression, and an increase in liver enzyme levels. These symptoms and alterations in blood cells are similar to those seen with tick-borne illnesses, including ehrlichiosis and disease caused by the Heartland virus.

The entire range of the virus's clinical manifestation is still not fully understood due to the low number of observed cases. However, a number of cases, both lethal and non-lethal, have since involved patients showing symptoms consistent with the index case. In two nonfatal cases, one in Stillwater, Oklahoma, in 2015, and the other in Long Island, New York, in 2021, both presented the same early symptoms as the index case patient. Shortly after receiving tick bites, the patients reported fever, headache, fatigue, rash, muscle, and joint pain. Symptoms for these patients did not progress further, and both made full recoveries. Although those cases did not develop to the lethal stage, the same early symptoms are seen in similar fatal cases as well. In two other lethal cases, one is Sullivan, Missouri, in 2017, and the other in Bourbon County, Kansas, in 2026, lab results showed the same trend of reduced platelet and white blood cell counts, with the Missouri patient even experiencing similar bone marrow issues. Both cases followed a similar timeline where, in a matter of three to four weeks after hospitalization, patients developed complications in the kidneys, lungs, heart, and multiple other organs, leading to rapid decline and eventual death. Some of the conditions these patients experienced include pneumonia, atelectasis, partial and complete respiratory failure, severe ischemia in multiple extremities, and hemophagocytic lymphohistiocytosis (HLH).

== Diagnosis, treatment, and prevention ==
Currently, the only available diagnostic testing for the virus is performed by the CDC and no commercial alternatives are available. The CDC utilizes blood serum samples for testing via plaque-reduction neutralization test (PRNT) and the reverse transcription-polymerase chain reaction (RT-PCR) technique for identification of the virus. Testing is performed based on whether samples were collected within two weeks of onset symptoms. Despite limited diagnostic measures, antibodies have been found in individuals who have not reported infection, indicating a number of cases have likely gone undiagnosed.

There is currently no specific treatment or vaccine for the virus approved for human infection; supportive therapy is recommended. However, studies using mice lacking type I interferon receptors (Ifnar1^{-/-}) have revealed potentially beneficial antiviral medications, monoclonal antibodies, and an mRNA vaccine. Molnupiravir and favipiravir, two nucleoside analogs, have been shown to be effective treatments in mice models when administered therapeutically or prophylactically. Numerous monoclonal antibodies have also been developed which have shown varying degrees of success at protecting mice form lethal doses of virus infection. Along with these antibodies, an mRNA vaccine which targets the viral envelope of the virus was developed which provided strong protection from Bourbon virus strains and closely related Oz virus. Since the virus is vectored by ticks, the CDC primarily recommends the avoidance of tick bites to prevent infection.

== See also ==
- Tick-borne disease
- Emerging infectious disease
