= Dhori virus =

Virus classification
- (unranked): Virus
- Realm: Riboviria
- Kingdom: Orthornavirae
- Phylum: Negarnaviricota
- Class: Insthoviricetes
- Order: Articulavirales
- Family: Orthomyxoviridae
- Genus: Thogotovirus
- Species: Thogotovirus dhoriense

Serotypes
- Batken virus; Dhori virus

Species of virus

Dhori virus (DHOV) is a species of the genus Thogotovirus and a member of the family Orthomyxoviridae. It is infectious to humans, but its host is most commonly Ixodidae ticks, and can also infect other species of ticks, mosquitoes, and mammals. DHOV is lethal to mice, leads to high rates of miscarriages in sheep and goats, and causes systemic pathologic changes in mice similar to those reported in virulent influenza A (H5N1) virus infection.

== History ==
=== Origin ===
Dhori virus was first discovered in 1961, in the Indian state of Gujarat. It appeared in camels bitten by the tick Hyalomma dromedarii.

It later appeared in Russian factory workers, and continued to spread throughout Europe. The zoonotic disease appears to infect those who work around livestock, though there have been no cases of person to person transmission.

== Symptoms ==
The virus causes flu-like symptoms. The central nervous system may be affected in severe cases.

== Structure ==
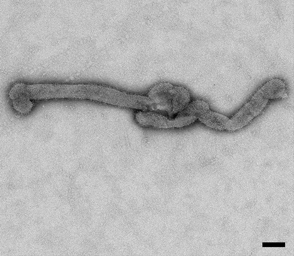
Bourbon Virus (A close link to DHOV, and similar structure.)

The Dhori virus is compiled of a single-stranded RNA made up of 6 negative-sense segments. Replication and transcription take place within the nucleus of the cell, along with the Thogoto virus (THOV). The virus produces single-envelope glycoprotein (Gp) to enter a host sell, before blocking mammalian interferon genes. Its experimental PDB structure is 5XEB.

Its structure is most similar to the H5N1 influenza A strand, and other influenza viruses, sharing biochemical and genetic similarities.

Batken virus (BKNV) is considered a subtype of DHOV. Serological cross-reactions between BKNV and DHOV indicate a phylogenetic relationship between these viruses.

Additionally, in 2014 Bourbon virus (BRBV) was found to be phylogenetically related to DHOV.
