= Johnston Atoll virus =

Virus classification
- (unranked): Virus
- Realm: Riboviria
- Kingdom: Orthornavirae
- Phylum: Negarnaviricota
- Class: Insthoviricetes
- Order: Articulavirales
- Family: Orthomyxoviridae
- Genus: Quaranjavirus
- Species: Quaranjavirus johnstonense

Synonyms
- Johnston Atoll virus

Species of virus

Johnston Atoll virus (Quaranjavirus johnstonense) is a species of virus in the Quaranjavirus genus in the virus family Orthomyxoviridae. It was first isolated in 1964 from ticks found in a Noddy Tern nest on Sand Island, Johnston Atoll.

The discovery of the virus was notable, as the only other species in the genus at the time had been previously discovered in Africa.

Mainly concentrated in the Pacific, the range of this virus includes Johnston Atoll and New Zealand.
