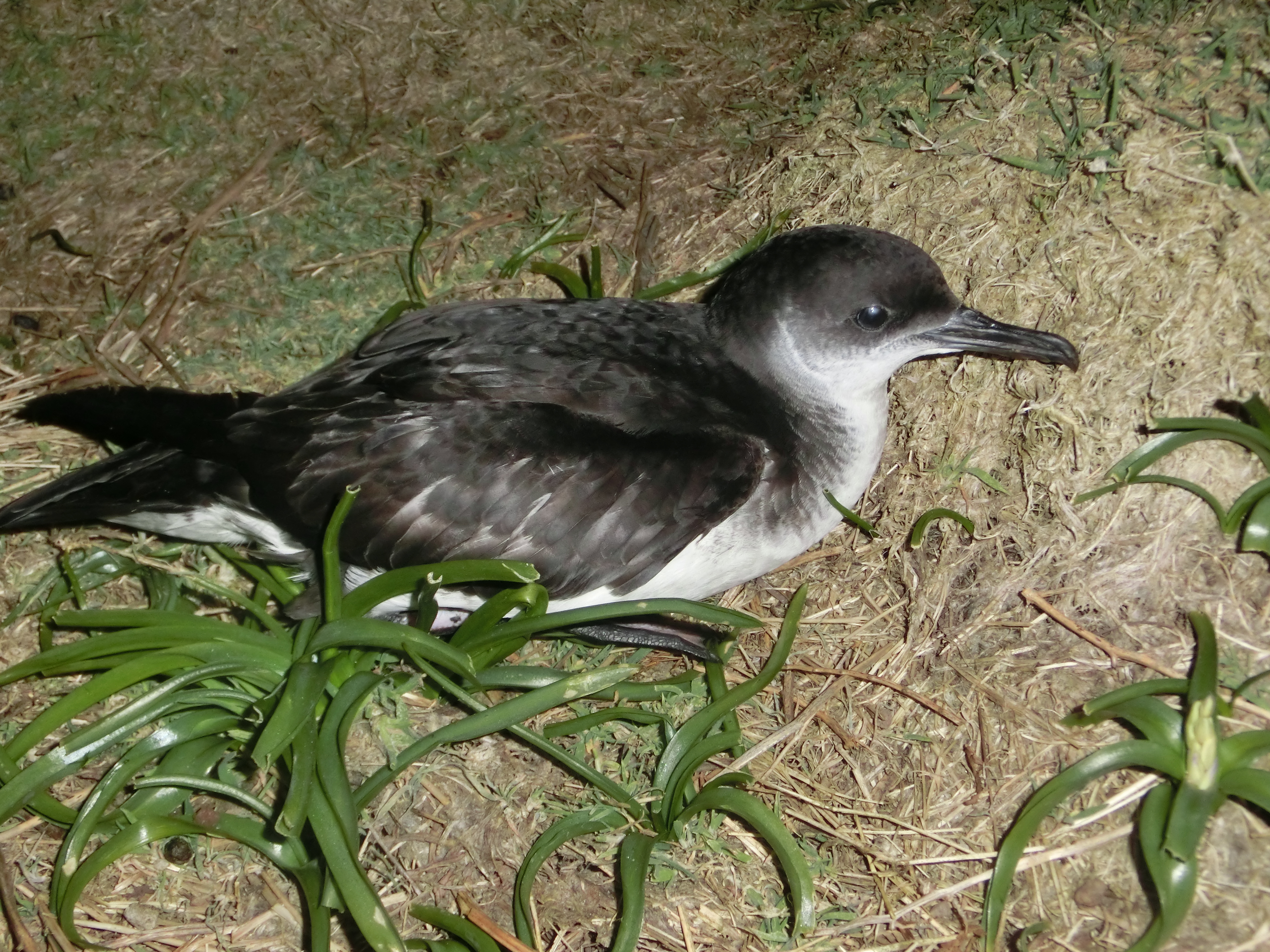
- On Skomer

Conservation status
- Least Concern (IUCN 3.1)

Scientific classification
- Kingdom: Animalia
- Phylum: Chordata
- Class: Aves
- Order: Procellariiformes
- Family: Procellariidae
- Genus: Puffinus
- Species: P. puffinus

Binomial name
- Puffinus puffinus (Brünnich, 1764)
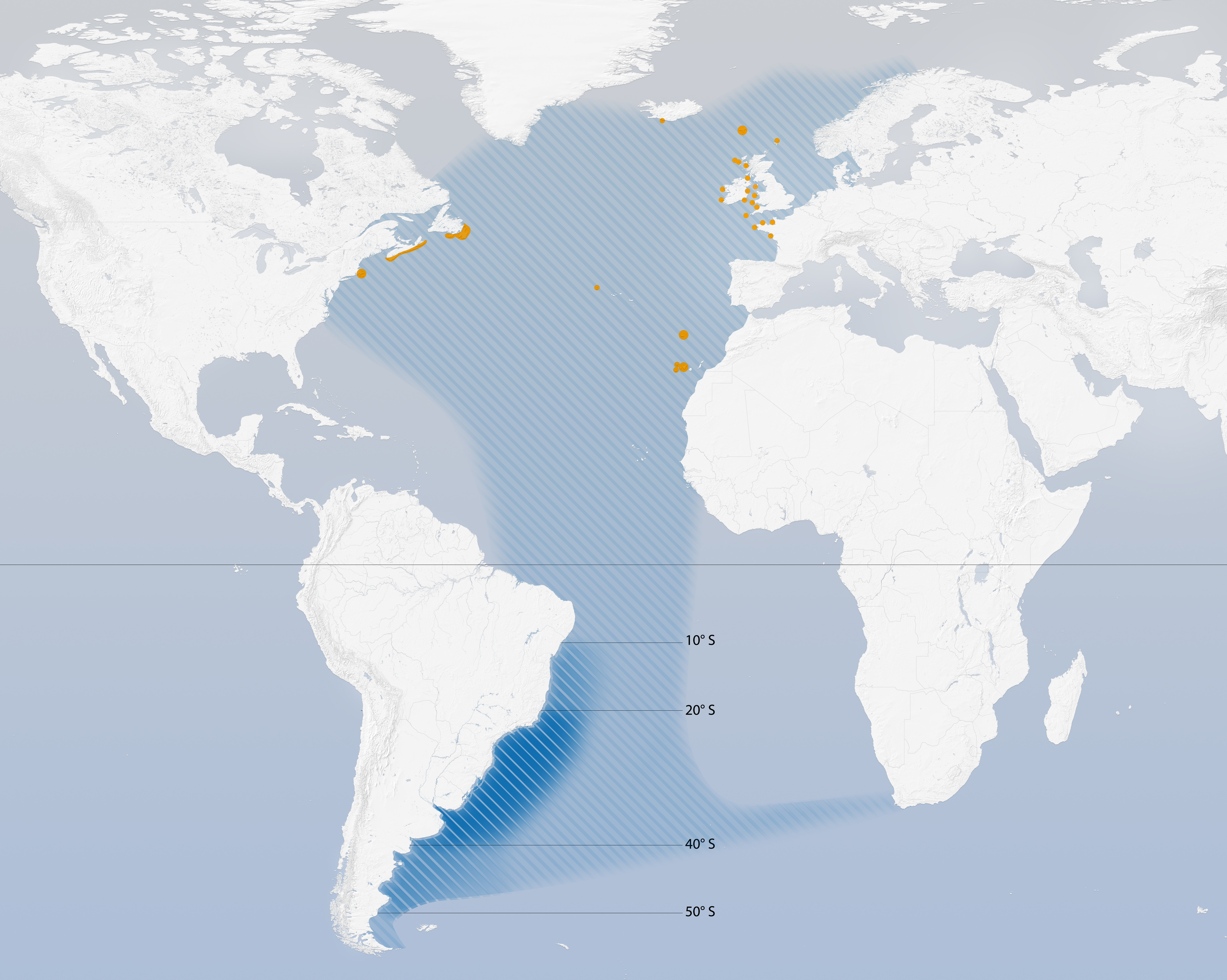
- Breeding colonies Non-breeding visitor (ranges are approximate)

Synonyms
- Procellaria puffinus Brünnich, 1764

Audio
- Recording from Skomer Island, Wales

= Manx shearwater =

Species of bird

The Manx shearwater (Puffinus puffinus) is a medium-sized shearwater in the seabird family Procellariidae. The scientific name of this species records a name shift: Manx shearwaters were called Manks puffins in the 17th century. Puffin is an Anglo-Norman word (Middle English pophyn) for the cured carcasses of nestling shearwaters. The Atlantic puffin acquired the name much later, possibly because of its similar nesting habits.

== Taxonomy ==
The shearwaters form part of the family Procellariidae, a widespread group containing nearly 100 species of medium to large seabirds. They have long, narrow wings and the characteristic "tube nose". Although it was considered a monotypic species, recently an endemic subspecies for the Canary Islands has been proposed P. puffinus canariensis. The large genus Puffinus includes several species formerly considered to be subspecies of the Manx shearwater, including the yelkouan shearwater, Balearic shearwater, Hutton's shearwater, black-vented shearwater, fluttering shearwater, Townsend's shearwater and the Hawaiian shearwater. Of these, the Hawaiian and possibly Townsend's shearwaters seem to be most closely related to the Manx shearwater.

Three extinct species appear to be closely related to the Manx shearwater, the lava shearwater, the dune shearwater and Scarlett's shearwater. DNA recovered from the lava shearwater of the Canary Islands suggests that it is the Manx shearwater's sister species despite being significantly smaller.

The Manx shearwater was first described by Danish zoologist Morten Thrane Brünnich as Procellaria puffinus in 1764. The current scientific name Puffinus derives from "puffin" and its variants, such as poffin, pophyn, and puffing, which referred to the cured carcass of the fat nestling of the shearwater, a former delicacy. The original usage dates from at least 1337, but from as early as 1678, the term gradually came to be used for another seabird, the Atlantic puffin. The current English name was first recorded in 1835 and refers to the nesting of this species on the Calf of Man.

== Description ==
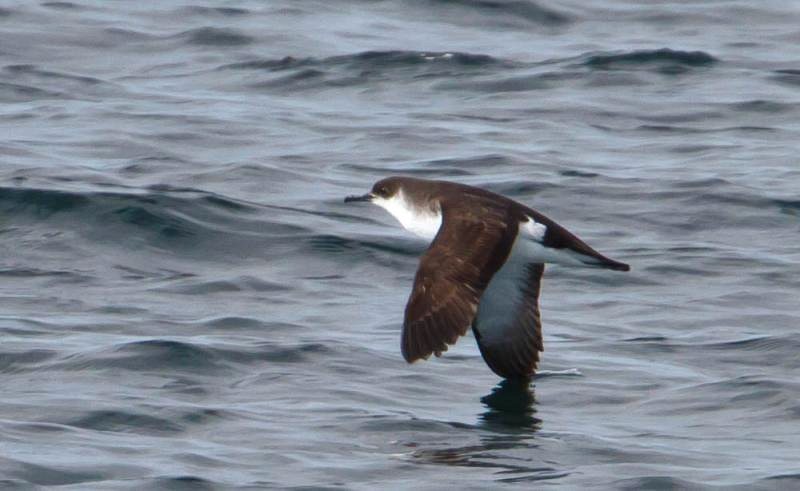
Flying in Iceland

The Manx shearwater is 30–38 cm (12–15 in) with a 76–89 cm (30–35 in) wingspan and weighs 350–575 g (12 1/2–20 1/2 oz). It has the typically "shearing" flight of the genus, dipping from side to side on stiff wings with few wingbeats, the wingtips almost touching the water. This bird looks like a flying cross, with its wings held at right angles to the body, and it changes from black to white as the black upper parts and white under sides are alternately exposed as it travels low over the sea.

=== Voice ===
This shearwater is mainly silent at sea, even when birds are gathered off the breeding colonies. It calls on its nocturnal visits to the nesting burrows in flight, on the ground, and in the burrows, although moonlight depresses the amount of calling. The vocalisations largely consists of a raucous series of croons, howls, and screams, typically in groups of a few syllables, which become weaker and throatier. The male has some clear ringing and shrieking tones absent from the harsher repertoire of the female, the difference being obvious when a pair duets.

The nocturnal vocalisations of Manx shearwater are notorious for their eerie character and the alarm they might arouse in uninitiated hearers. Anecdotally: "the diabolical shrieks and cackles of this species have earned it, in various parts of the world and various languages, the local nickname 'Devil Bird'".

Females can recognize the voice of their mates, but not of their young. They do not provide postnesting care, and a chick in their burrow is likely their own, so voice identification is not needed.

=== Vision ===
Each retina of the Manx shearwater has one fovea and an elongated strip of high photoreceptor density. The pecten has many blood vessels and appears to keep the retina supplied with nutrients.

The vision of the Manx shearwater has a number of adaptations to its way of life. Like other tube-nosed seabirds, it has a long, narrow area of visual sensitivity containing the fovea across the retina of the eye. This region is characterised by the presence of ganglion cells that are regularly arrayed and larger than those found in the rest of the retina. This feature helps in the detection of items in a small area projecting below and around the bill. It may assist in the detection of prey near the sea surface as a bird flies low over it.

Since it visits its breeding colony at night, a shearwater has adaptations for nocturnal vision, too. In the shearwater's eyes, the lens does most of the bending of light necessary to produce a focused image on the retina. The cornea, the outer covering of the eye, is relatively flat, so of low refractive power. In a diurnal bird like a pigeon, the reverse is true; the cornea is highly curved and is the principal refractive component. The ratio of refraction by the lens to that by the cornea is 1.6 for the shearwater and 0.4 for the pigeon. The shorter focal length of shearwater eyes give them a smaller, but brighter, image than is the case for pigeons. Although the Manx shearwater has adaptations for night vision, the effect is small, and these birds likely also use smell and hearing to locate their nests.

== Distribution and habitat ==
The Manx shearwater is entirely marine, typically flying within 10 m (30 ft) of the sea surface. It nests in burrows on small islands, which it visits only at night. Its nesting colonies are in the north Atlantic Ocean in the United Kingdom, Ireland, Iceland, the Faroe Islands, France, the Isle of Man, the Channel Islands, the Azores, Canary Islands, and Madeira. The most important colonies, with a total of more than 300,000 pairs, are on islands off Wales, Scotland, and Northern Ireland. Three-quarters of the British and Irish birds breed on just three islands; Skomer, Skokholm, and Rùm. Around 7000–9000 pairs breed in Iceland, with at least 15,000 pairs on the Faeroes. Other populations are of at most a few hundred pairs. The northeast of North America has recently been colonised from Newfoundland and Labrador to Massachusetts; although breeding was first recorded in 1973, populations remain small. Records in the northeast Pacific are increasing, and breeding has been suspected in British Columbia and Alaska.

During the breeding-season birds regularly commute between their colonies and offshore feeding grounds that can be up to 1,500 km away. For example, adult Manx shearwaters rearing their chick on the west coast of Ireland have been observed to travel all the way to the Mid-Atlantic Ridge to feed when the conditions are right.

The breeding colonies are deserted from July to March, when the birds migrate to the South Atlantic, wintering mainly off Brazil and Argentina, with smaller numbers off southwest South Africa. Juvenile birds undertake their first migration without their parents. Only a few days after leaving the nest, these birds can already travel up to 2000 km. The journey south can be over 10,000 km (6,000 mi), so a 50-year-old bird has probably covered over a million km (600,000 mi) on migration alone. The migration also appears to be quite complex, containing many stopovers and foraging zones throughout the Atlantic Ocean. Ornithologist Chris Mead estimated that a bird ringed in 1957 when aged about 5 years and still breeding on Bardsey Island off Wales in April 2002 had flown over 8 million km (5 million mi) in total during its 50-year life.

Manx shearwaters are able to fly directly back to their burrows when released hundreds of kilometres away, even inland.

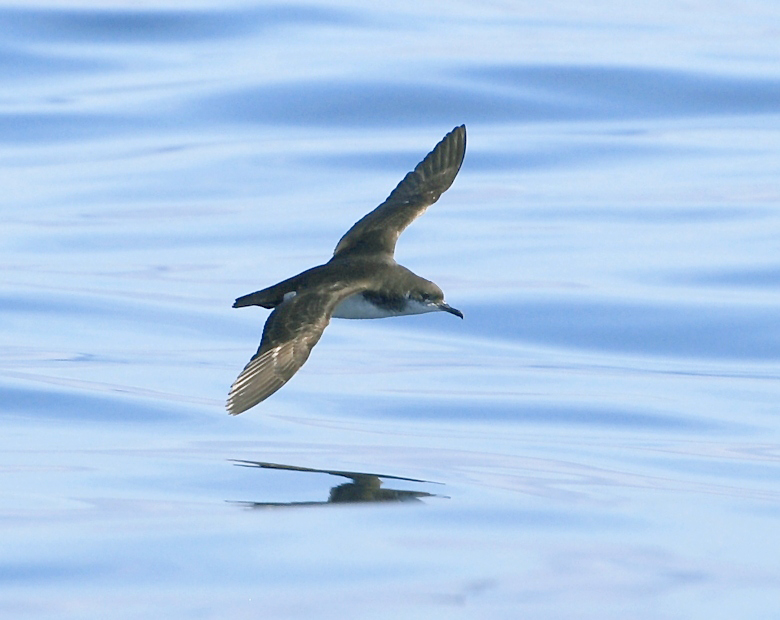
In flight

== Behaviour ==
Manx shearwaters are long-lived birds. A Manx shearwater breeding on Copeland Island, Northern Ireland, was as of 2003/04, the oldest known living wild bird in the world: ringed as an adult (at least 5 years old) in July 1953, it was retrapped in July 2003, at least 55 years old.

This is a gregarious species, which can be seen in large numbers from boats or headlands, especially on migration in autumn. It is silent at sea, but at night, the breeding colonies are alive with raucous cackling calls.

=== Breeding ===
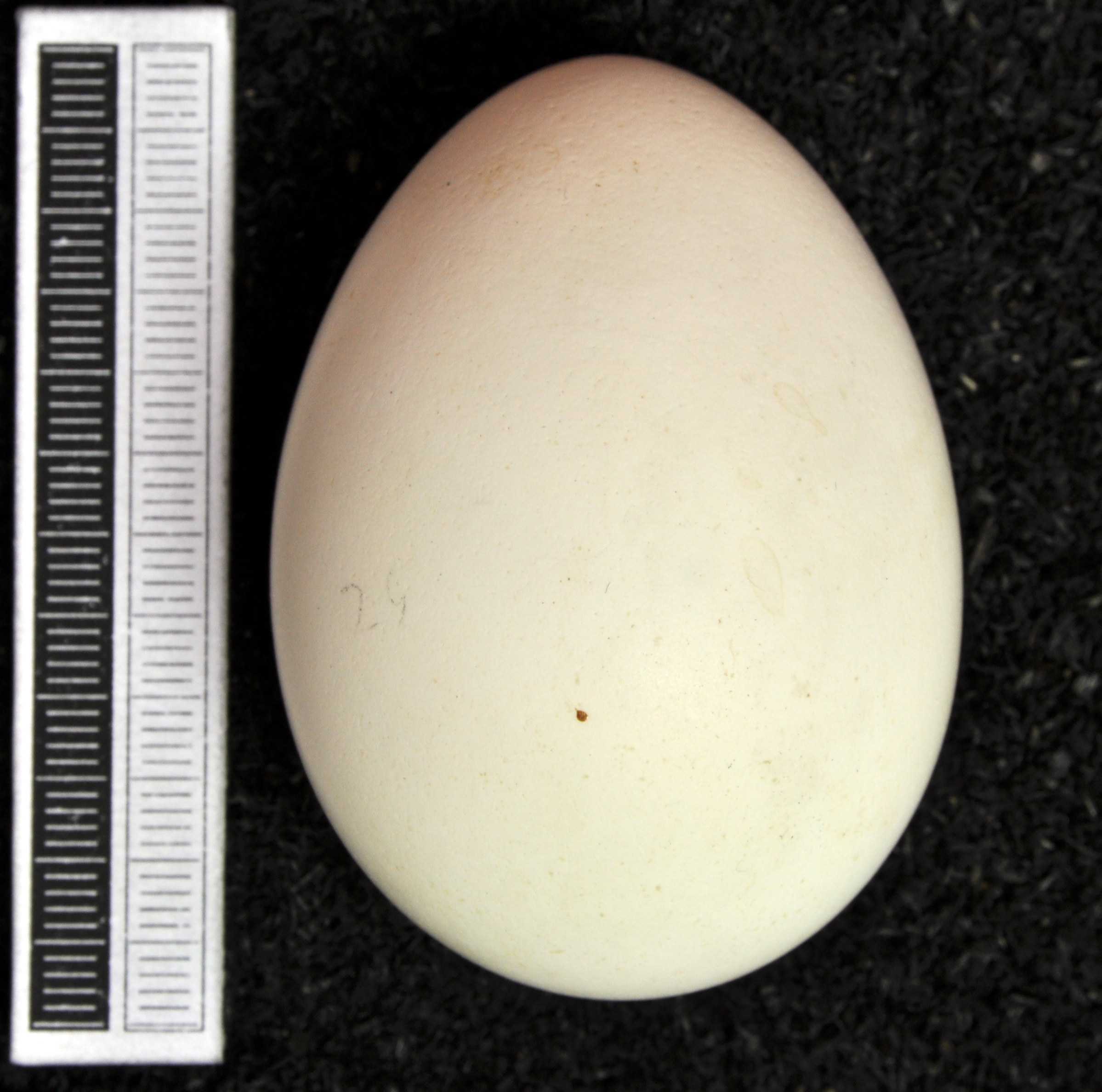
Egg, Collection Museum Wiesbaden

Although shearwaters return to the breeding colonies from March onwards, the females often then leave again for 2–3 weeks before egg-laying in early May. Males return to the colonies in which they were hatched, but up to half of females may move elsewhere. The nest is a burrow, often previously excavated by a European rabbit, although shearwaters can dig their own holes. Suitable holes under rocks may also be used. The burrows may be reused in subsequent years.

The single white egg averages 61 mm × 42 mm (2 1/2 in × 1 3/4 in) and weighs 57 g (2 oz), of which 7% is shell.

=== Food and feeding ===
The Manx shearwater feeds on small fish (herrings, sprats, and sand eels), crustaceans, cephalopods, and surface offal. The bird catches food off the surface or by pursuit diving, and forages alone or in small flocks. It can be attracted by feeding cetaceans, but rarely follows boats or associates with other shearwater species.A biologging study found that Manx shearwaters were more likely to begin concentrated searching and foraging dives in clearer water, and that underwater visibility also predicted their dive rate and depth.

Tube-nosed seabirds can detect food items at a distance of several tens of kilometres using their sense of smell to detect offal and compounds such as dimethyl sulfoxide produced when phytoplankton is consumed by krill. They track across the wind until they find a scent and then follow it upwind to its origin.

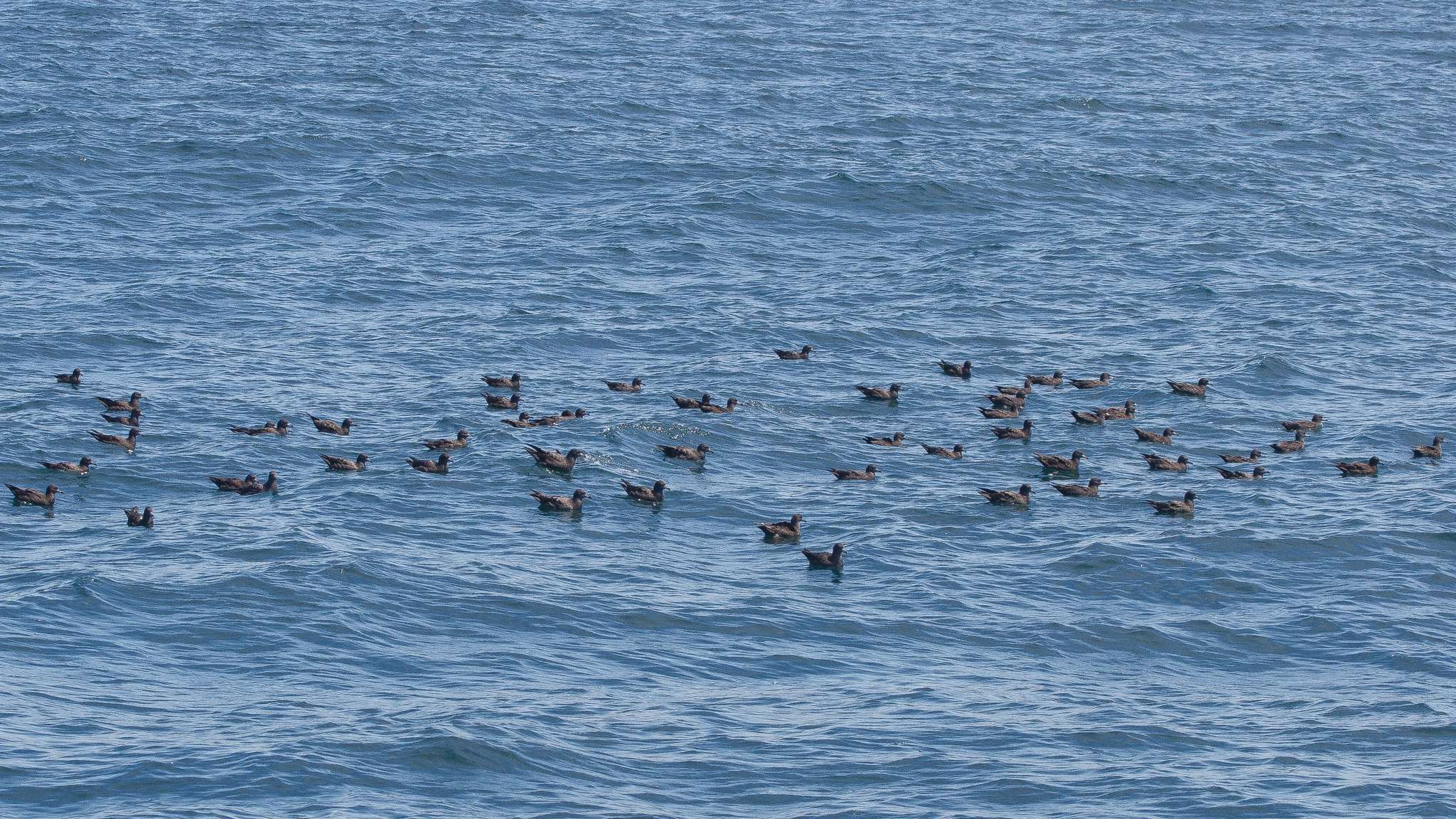
Rafting, a common behaviour in shearwaters

=== Rafting ===
Manx shearwaters engage in a behaviour termed "rafting", where birds sit, often in large groups of more than 10,000, on the water adjacent to their Skomer Island breeding colony before and after visiting their chicks. Rafts move closer to the island during the night and further away in the morning which produces a "halo" effect - where no birds are found close to the island during daylight. These day-night cycles of rafting distributions are prominent for Manx shearwaters around Skomer Island and might provide a way of waiting for dusk that reduces predation risk.

== Predators and parasites ==
Because of their lack of mobility on land, Manx shearwaters are vulnerable to attack by large gulls, such as the great black-backed gull, and great skua. Birds of prey, such as the peregrine falcon and golden eagle, are also recorded as killing adult birds.

Rats and cats are a serious problem where they are present; the large shearwater colony on the Calf of Man was destroyed by rats that arrived from a shipwreck in the late 18th century. European hedgehogs eat the eggs of nesting seabirds where they have been introduced. Red deer have been recorded killing and eating young shearwaters on at least Foula, Skokholm, and Rùm; on the latter island, 4% of the chicks are killed by deer, and sheep have also been involved. The reason for the carnivorous behaviour is thought to be a need for extra calcium.

Manx shearwaters frequently carry feather lice (Mallophaga) most of which are either the feather-eaters in the groups Ischnocera, or Amblycera, which also consume blood. The most common are the ischnocerans Halipeurus diversus and Trabeculus aviator. The nests of breeding birds frequently contain the shearwater flea; Ornithopsylla laetitiae is also commonly present, which shares a common ancestry with North American rabbit fleas. Where their burrows are near those of Atlantic puffins, the tick Ixodes uriae is common. The mite Neotrombicula autumnalis is often present, and has been implicated in spreading puffinosis. Puffinosis is a viral disease of in which young birds get blisters on their feet, conjunctivitis, and problems with movement. The death rate can reach 70% in infected birds. Internal parasites include the tapeworm Tetrabothrius cylindricus.

== Status ==
The European population of the Manx shearwater has been estimated at 350,000–390,000 breeding pairs or 1,050,000–1,700,000 individual birds, and makes up 95% of the world total numbers. Although this species' population now appears to be declining, the decrease is not rapid or large enough to trigger conservation vulnerability criteria. Given its high numbers, this shearwater is therefore classified by the International Union for Conservation of Nature as being of least concern.

In the north of its range, numbers are stable and the range is expanding, but human activities are affecting populations in the Macaronesian islands in the eastern Atlantic Ocean. These include birds stranded when dazzled by artificial lighting. As with other shearwaters and petrels, newly fledged Manx shearwaters are susceptible to grounding in built-up areas due to artificial light. The moon cycle and strong onshore winds largely influence grounding events in west Scotland, and visibility conditions to a lesser extent. Around 1000–5000 chicks a year are legally taken for food in the Faroes. Introduced mammals are a problem, although populations can recover when rats and cats are removed from islands. Rabbits may try to occupy burrows, but also dig new tunnels.

== In culture ==
The large chicks of the Manx shearwater are very rich in oil from their fish diet and have been eaten since prehistoric times. They are easily extricated from their burrows, and the annual crop from the Calf of Man may have been as high as 10,000 birds per year in the 17th century. The young birds were also eaten in Ireland, Scotland, and the Scottish islands.

The eerie, nocturnal cries of nesting shearwaters and petrels has led to associations with the supernatural. The breeding colonies at Trollaval on Rùm and Trøllanes and Trøllhøvdi in the Faroe Islands are believed to have acquired their troll associations from the night-time clamour.
