= Quaranfil virus =

Virus classification
- (unranked): Virus
- Realm: Riboviria
- Kingdom: Orthornavirae
- Phylum: Negarnaviricota
- Class: Insthoviricetes
- Order: Articulavirales
- Family: Orthomyxoviridae
- Genus: Quaranjavirus
- Species: Quaranjavirus quaranfilense

Synonyms
- Quaranfil quaranjavirus

Species of virus

Quaranfil virus is a species of virus in the Quaranjavirus genus in the virus family Orthomyxoviridae. It has a negative sense, single-stranded RNA genome composed of 6 segments. Its hosts are ticks, birds, and humans. It was isolated from ticks near Cairo, Egypt in 1953. The virus can infect humans, as confirmed by serological study of human serum samples in Egypt in the 1960s that showed that 8% of the local population had neutralizing antibodies to the virus. The virus has not yet been connected to a human disease.
