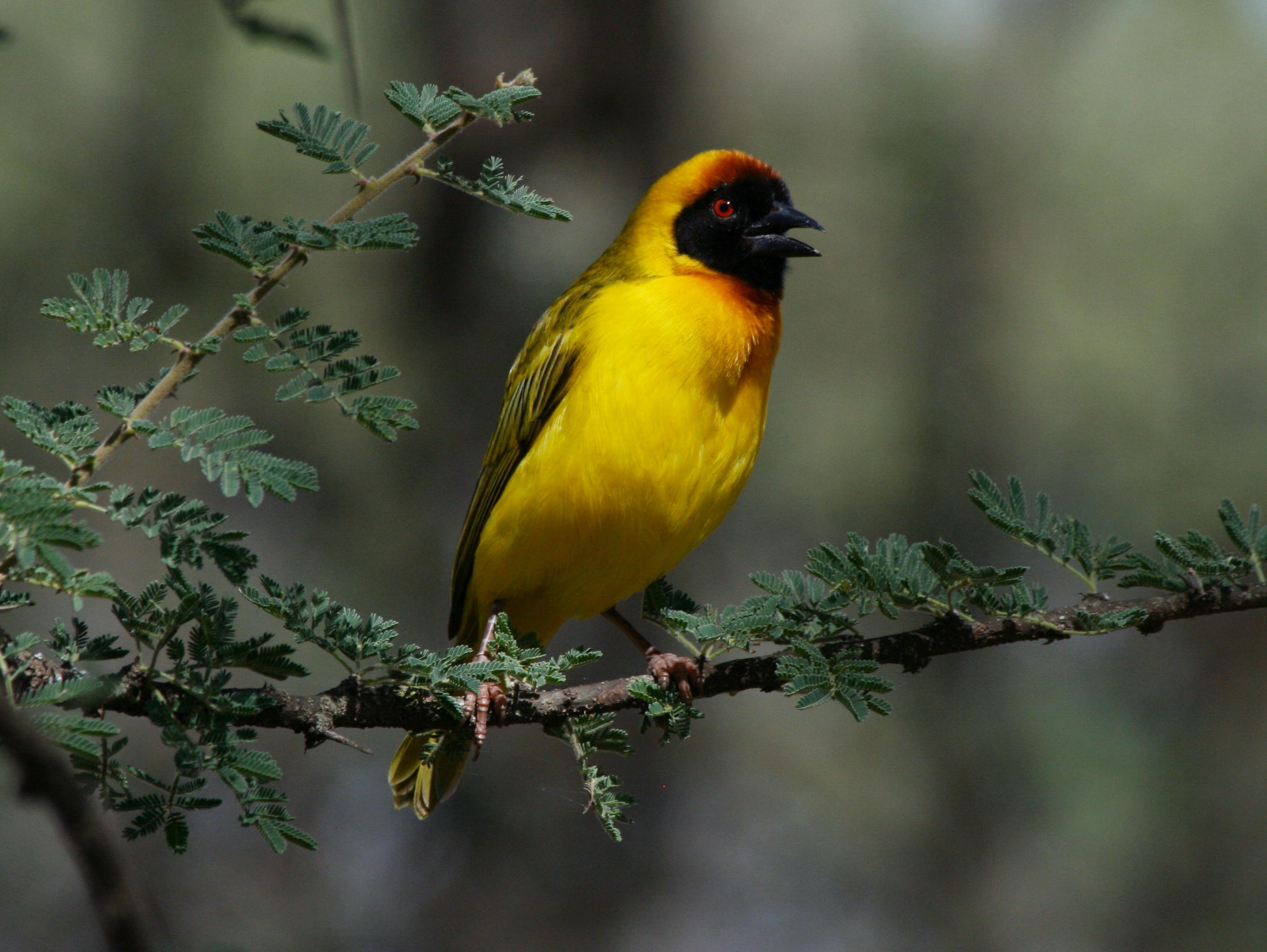
- Male

Conservation status
- Least Concern (IUCN 3.1)

Scientific classification
- Kingdom: Animalia
- Phylum: Chordata
- Class: Aves
- Order: Passeriformes
- Family: Ploceidae
- Genus: Ploceus
- Species: P. vitellinus

Binomial name
- Ploceus vitellinus (Lichtenstein, MHC, 1823)

= Vitelline masked weaver =

Species of bird

The vitelline masked weaver (Ploceus vitellinus) is a species of bird in the family Ploceidae. It is found in western, central, and eastern Africa.

== Gallery ==
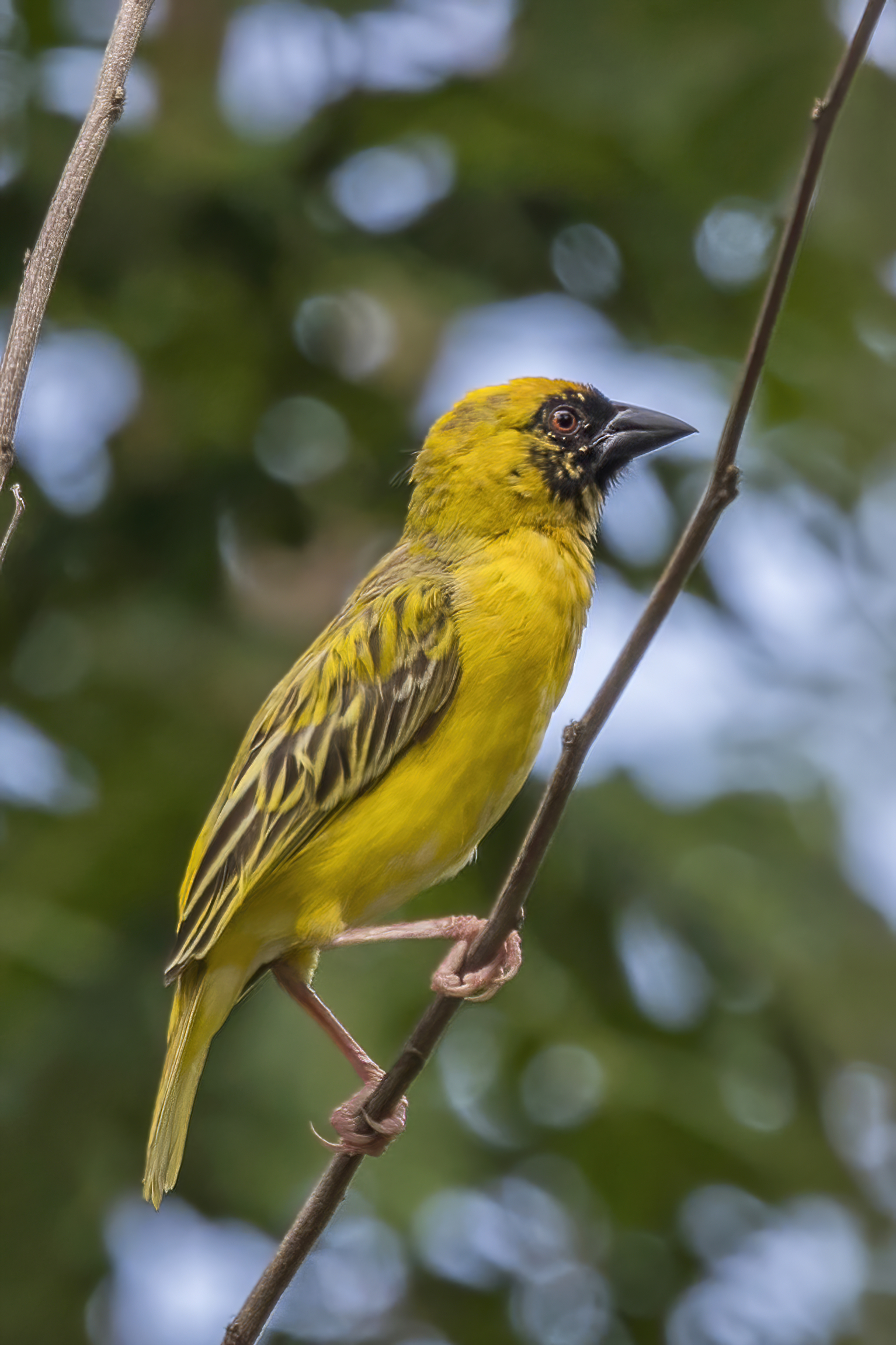
male P. v. peixotoi
São Tomé and Príncipe

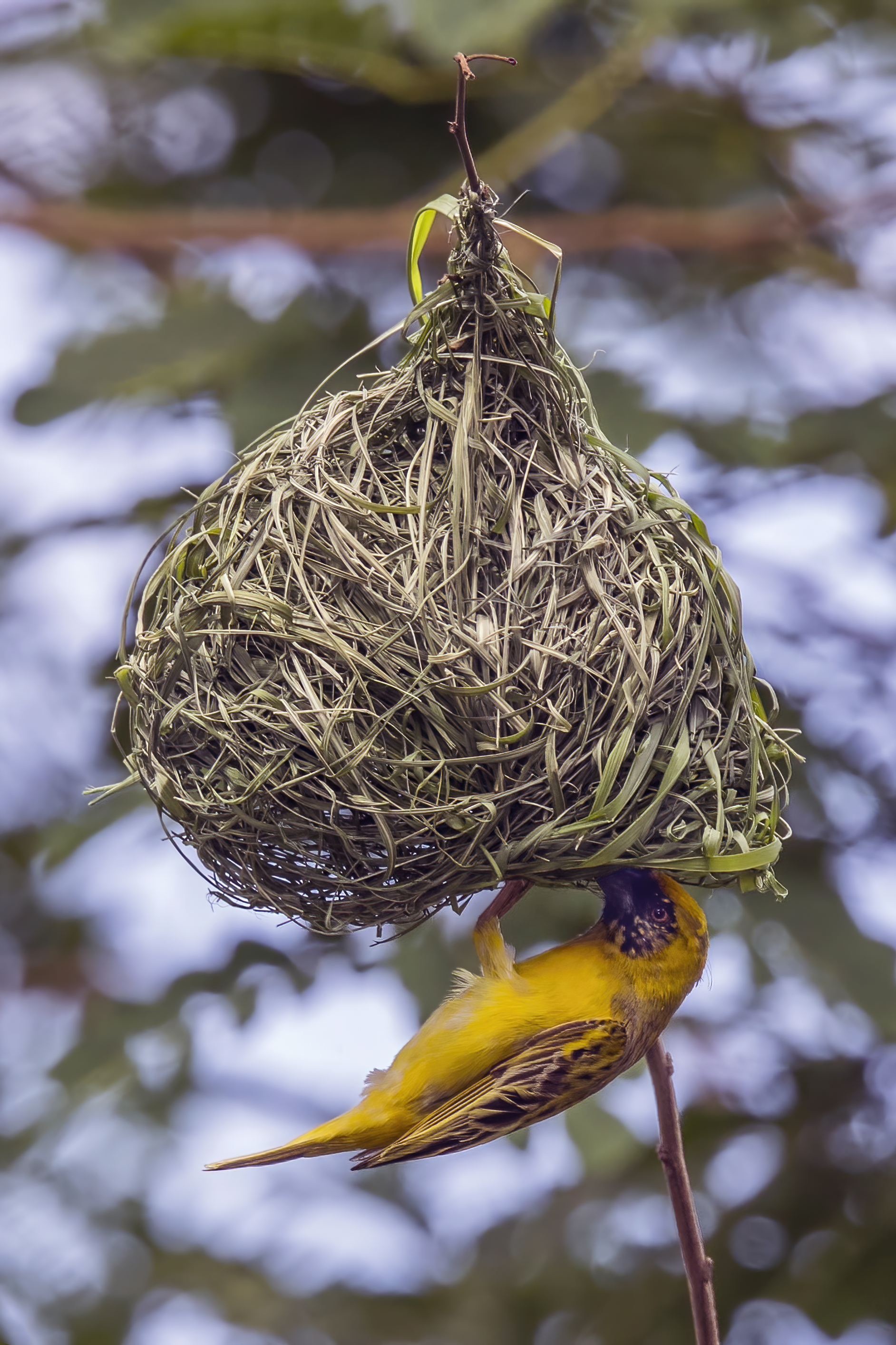
male P. v. peixotoi nest building
São Tomé and Príncipe
