= Puffinosis =

Viral bird disease

Puffinosis is a virus disease of Manx shearwaters. Young birds get blisters on their feet, conjunctivitis and problems with movement. The death rate can reach 70% in infected birds. The infection is most common near walls and similar structures where the virus can be transmitted between feet. The disease can also occur in several species of gull and in the northern fulmar.
