= Yellow Fever Commission =

US Army research team

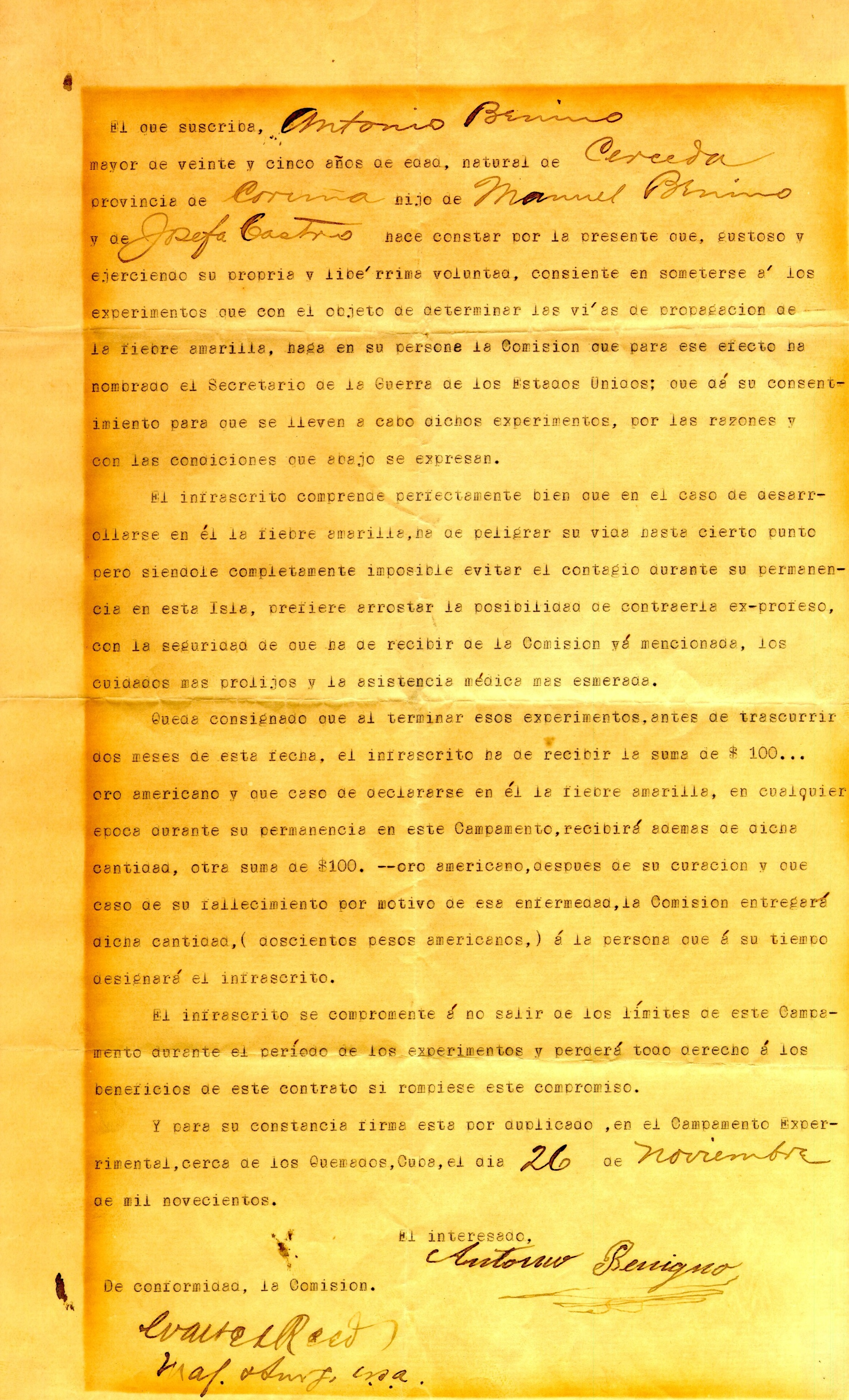
Spanish

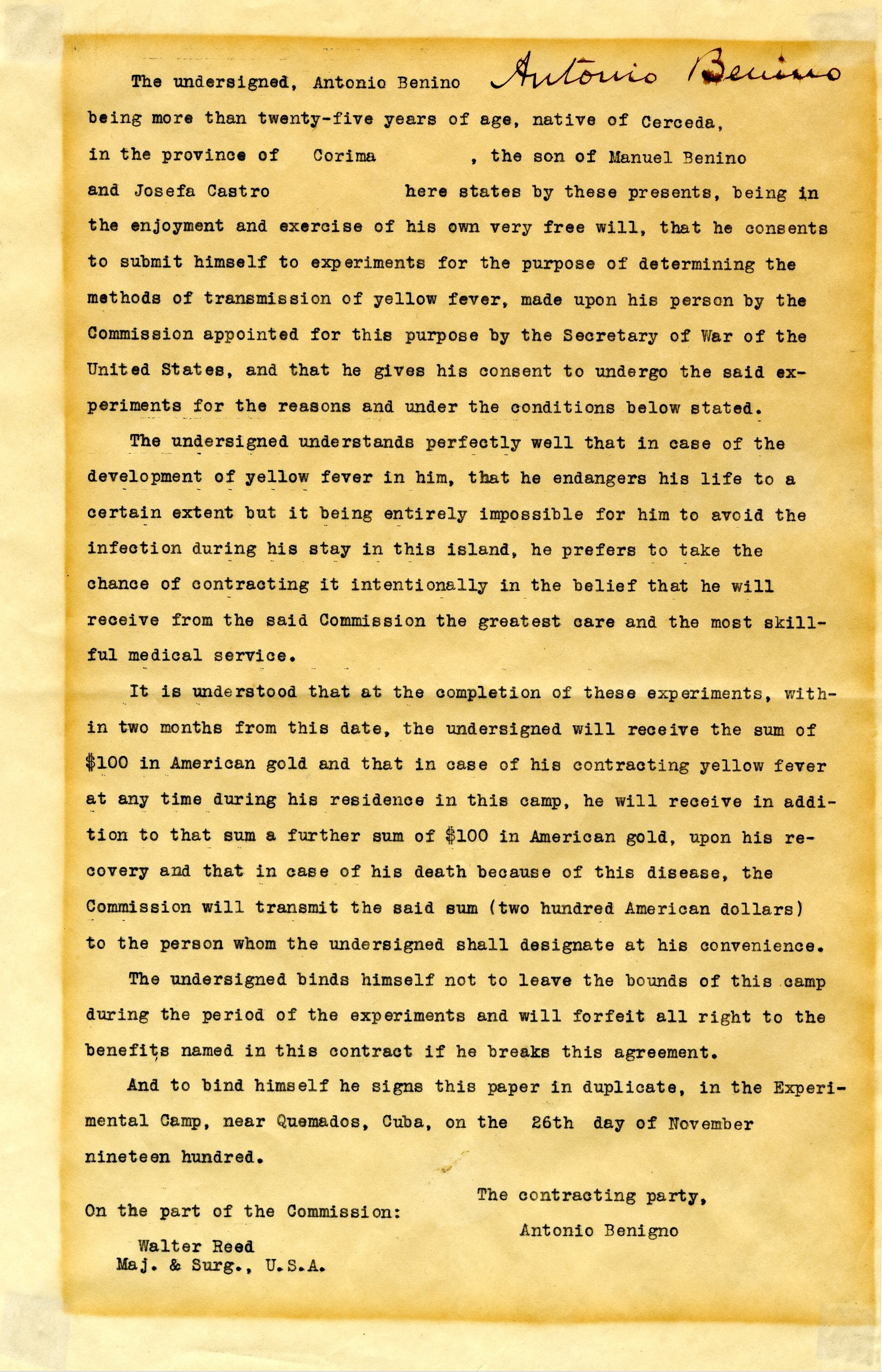
English

Walter Reed authored these informed consent documents in 1900 for his research on yellow fever

The Yellow Fever Commission was a research team of the United States Army which researched treatment for yellow fever.

The commission was originally formed as the Reed Commission by Army Surgeon General George Sternberg in 1900. The medical research board was forged as a four member board consisting of Walter Reed, James Carroll, Jesse W. Lazear, and Aristides Agramonte. The U.S. Army research detachment was commissioned for public health surveillance regarding a tropical disease susceptible by the predatorial Aedes aegypti or an infectious mosquito in Cuba. The mosquito-borne disease or yellow fever pathogen was found to have inflicted an elevated casualty count during the Spanish–American War.

The research process itself became a focus of study for later generations.

A United States nurse named Clara Maass and two Spanish immigrants were among those who died as a result of their research participation.

Researchers mark the research of the Yellow Fever Commission as the origin of the model of modern consent in medical research.

== In popular culture ==
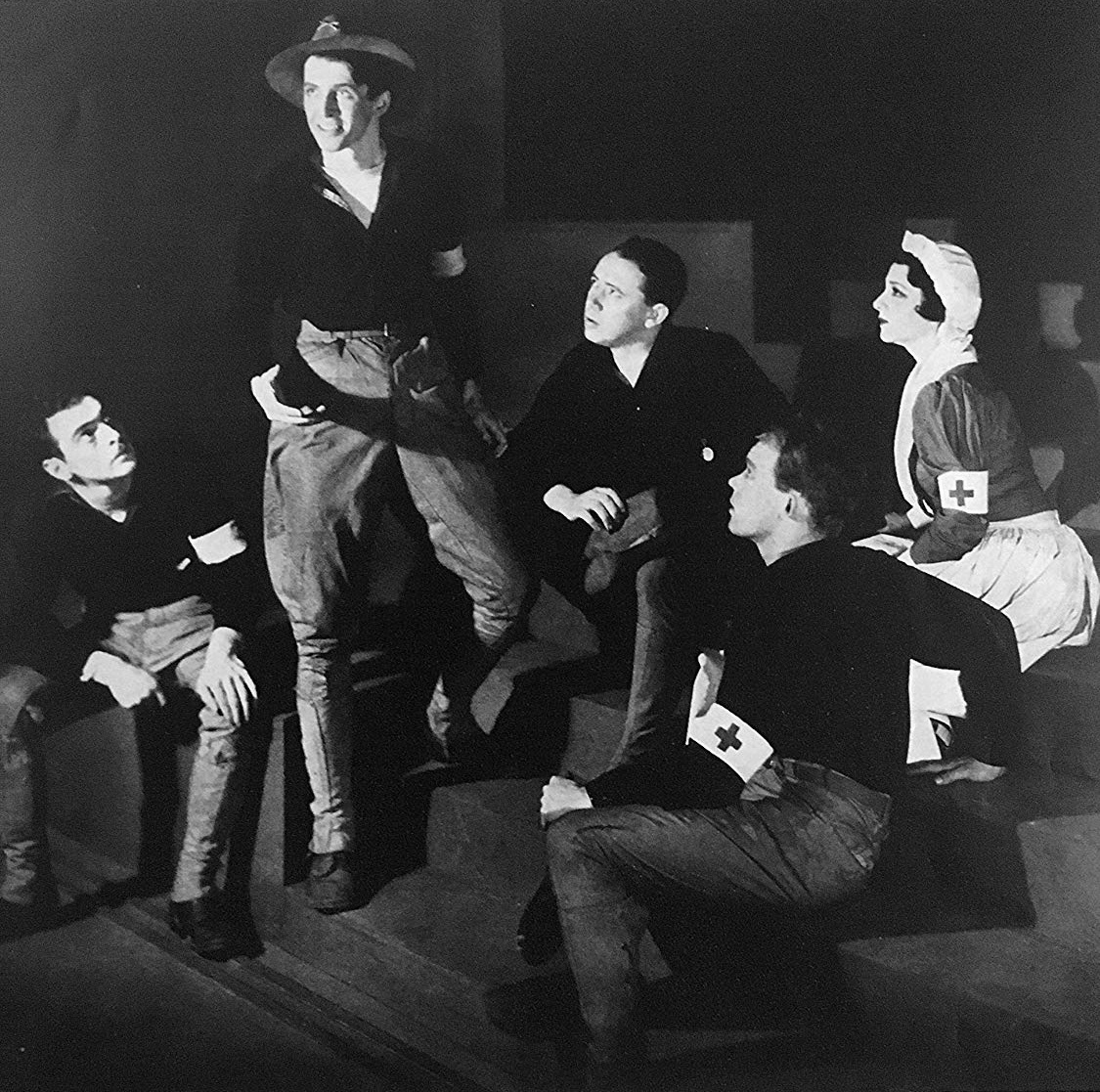
1934 Yellow Jack Broadway Playbill Promotional

The 1934 Yellow Jack theatrical production told the story of Walter Reed in the Yellow Fever Commission. The theatre production was cast with Sam Levene, James Stewart, Eddie Acuff, and Myron McCormick.

The Broadway play was the basis of Yellow Jack, a 1938 movie presenting the same narrative.

== See also ==
A Short Account of the Malignant Fever
Carlos Finlay
Diseases and epidemics of the 19th century
Juan Guiteras
Valentine Seaman
Walter Reed Medal
William C. Gorgas

== Bibliography ==
- Shubert, Wm. Augustus (1860). "Yellow Fever : Its Origin, Improper Treatment, Prevention and Cure : With Remarks Regarding Alive-Burials in Times of the Epidemic, and an Interesting Narrative of Facts". Savannah, Georgia: J.M. Cooper. OCLC 14846240.
- Gamgee, John (1879). "Yellow Fever, A Nautical Disease; Its Origin and Prevention". Internet Archive. New York, New York: Appleton and Company. OCLC 1204751151.
- Hargis, Robert Bell Smith (1880). "Yellow Fever: Its Ship Origin and Prevention". Internet Archive. Philadelphia, Pennsylvania: D.G. Brinton, M.D. OCLC 1064196576.
- Kelly, Howard Atwood (1906). "Walter Reed and Yellow Fever". Internet Archive. Baltimore Medical Standard Book Company. OCLC 729175258.
- Howard Atwood Kelly; London School of Hygiene and Tropical Medicine (1907). "Walter Reed and Yellow Fever". Internet Archive. New York, New York: McClure, Phllips & Company. OCLC 970766807.
- Augustin, George (1909). "History of Yellow Fever". Internet Archive. New Orleans, Louisiana: Searcy & PFAFF, Ltd. OCLC 14799989.
