= Yellow Jack (play) =

1934 play written by Sidney Howard

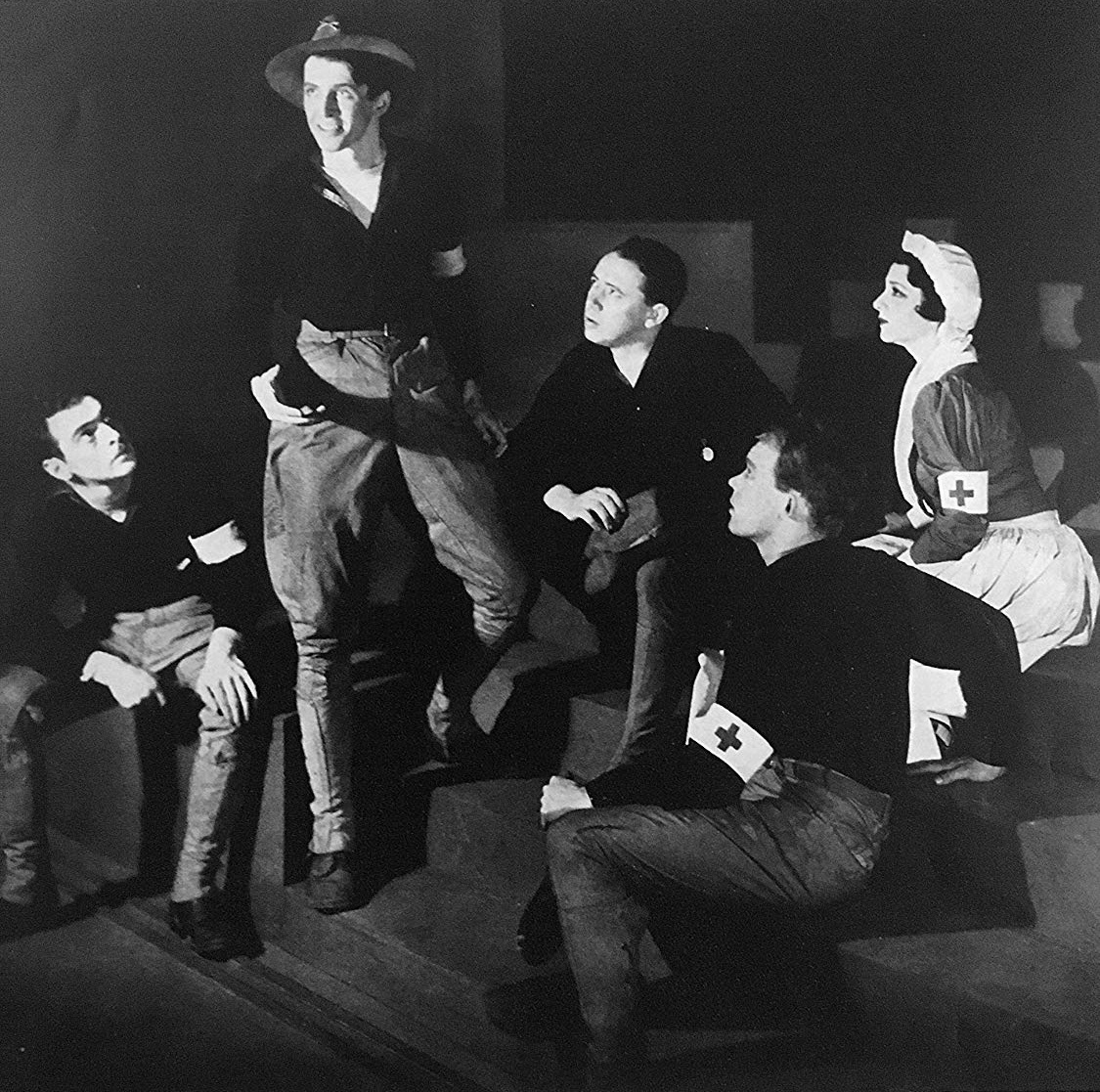
- Clockwise: Sam Levene, James Stewart, Edward Acuff, Katherine Wilson and Myron McCormick in the 1934 Broadway play
- Original language: English
- Written by: Sidney Howard; Paul de Kruif (collaborator)
- Subject: Major Walter Reed of the U.S. Army worked to diagnose and treat yellow fever (called "yellow jack") in Cuba in 1898–1900
- Genre: Drama
- Setting: New York today, London in January 1929, West Africa in June 1927, Cuba in 1900, and London in September 1929

Premiere
- Date: March 6, 1934

Yellow Jack is a 1934 docudrama play starring James Stewart and produced by Guthrie McClintic that was later adapted into a 1938 Hollywood movie by the same title. Both were co-written by Sidney Howard and Paul de Kruif (the former a Pulitzer- and Oscar-winning playwright and screenwriter; the latter a well-known microbiologist and author). The play is based on a chapter in Paul de Kruif's 1927 book Microbe Hunters.

James Stewart in his first dramatic role stars as Pvt. John O'Hara, a role reprised by Robert Montgomery in the 1938 film. Stewart later stated this role convinced him to continue his acting career during a time he recalled that "From 1932 through 1934. ... I'd only worked three months. Every play I got into folded." The experience led him to stay with acting and he first entered movies later that year in The Murder Man. Caricaturist Al Hirschfeld while covering the play for the New York Herald Tribune drew his first of 13 drawings (and only one from a play) he made over the course of Stewart's career.

The play opened at the opulent Martin Beck Theatre on March 6, 1934, and ran for 79 performances. The Martin Beck was renamed in 2003 for Al Hirschfeld, who drew the caricature for Yellow Jack. Prior to its debut, Herman Bernstein's Jewish Daily Bulletin covered the play, attesting that it did not contain antisemitic elements.

== Synopsis ==
After the Spanish–American War, in which more U. S. soldiers were killed by yellow fever (known as Yellow Jack) than in battle, the War Department sent a medical commission to Cuba to find, if possible, the cause and cure of this deadly tropical disease. The commission was headed by Dr. Walter Reed. With him was Dr. James Carroll. In Cuba they found Dr. Jesse Lazear, European-trained microbiologist, and Cuban Dr. Aristides Agramonte.

Limited in its experiments by the fact that animals are immune to Yellow Jack and embroiled in government interference, Reed decides that the only way to test the theory is to expose his own men to the disease. O'Hara volunteers to allow Dr. Reed to experiment on him.

Al Hirschfeld drawing from the Herald Tribune, March 11, 1934 (James Stewart in upper-left)

== Reception ==
Debuting on March 6, 1934, the Broadway production ran through May for a modest 79 performances. It generally received positive reviews, but the subject had limited popular appeal. Sam Levene was the only member of the original 1934 Broadway production of the play Yellow Jack to appear in the 1938 film of the same name.

== Original Broadway cast ==
- James Stewart as Medical Corps Pvt. O'Hara
- John Miltern as Major Walter Reed
- Edward Acuff as Pvt. McClelland
- Wylie Adams as Kraemer, as a Commissary Sergeant and as a member from the Rockefeller Foundation
- Jack Carr as Chambang, a Native Laboratory Assistant
- Eduardo Ciannelli as Aristides Agramonte, a Member of the American Yellow Fever Commission
- Francis Compton as a Major of the Royal Air Force
- Charles Gerard as Adrian Stokes, of the West African Yellow Fever Commission, Rocke
- Lloyd Gough as a Laboratory Assistant and as an Army Chaplain
- Harold Hoffat as Roger P. Ames, an Asst. Surgeon
- Colin Hunter (actor) as an Official of the Kenya Colony Government
- Bernard Jukes as a Laboratory Assistant
- Whitford Kane as Dr. Carlos Finlay
- Robert Keith as Jesse W. Lazear, a member of the American Yellow Fever Commission
- Geoffrey Kerr as Stackpoole
- Sam Levene as Pvt. Busch
- Richie Ling as Colonel Tory of the Marine Hospital Corps
- Barton MacLane as James Carroll, a member of the American Yellow Fever Commission
- Myron McCormick as Pvt. Brinkerhof
- Millard Mitchell as Pvt. William H. Dean
- Jock Munro as a Laboratory Assistant
- George Nash as Major William Crawford Gorgas
- Robert Shayne as Harkness and as Major Cartwright
- Frank Stringfellow as an Orderly
- Clyde Walters as an Orderly
- Katherine Wilson as Miss Blake, a Special Nurse in Charge of the Yellow Fever Ward

== Revivals ==
PFC Martin Ritt directed a Broadway production of Yellow Jack presented on April 7, 1944, at the 44th Street Theatre. A single performance for members of the U.S. armed services, the abbreviated version of the play featured actors from the simultaneous Broadway production of Winged Victory, also directed by Ritt. The cast—nearly all of them active-duty military—included John Forsythe (O'Hara), Gary Merrill (Walter Reed), Grant Richards (Aristides Agramonte), Philip Bourneuf (Dr. Carlos Finlay), George Reeves (James Carroll) and Whit Bissell (Brinkerhof).

In 1947 New York's American Repertory Theatre revived Yellow Jack for a four-week run at the International Theatre.

== Adaptations ==
Yellow Jack was adapted for an episode of the ABC television series Celanese Theatre, broadcast May 28, 1952. Macdonald Carey, Walter Abel and Sarah Churchill starred; Alex Segal directed. The play was adapted for an episode of the NBC–TV series Producers' Showcase, broadcast January 10, 1955, directed by Delbert Mann and starring Jackie Cooper and Broderick Crawford.

== See also ==
- Yellow Jack (1938 film)
