= Juan Guiteras =

Cuban physician and pathologist

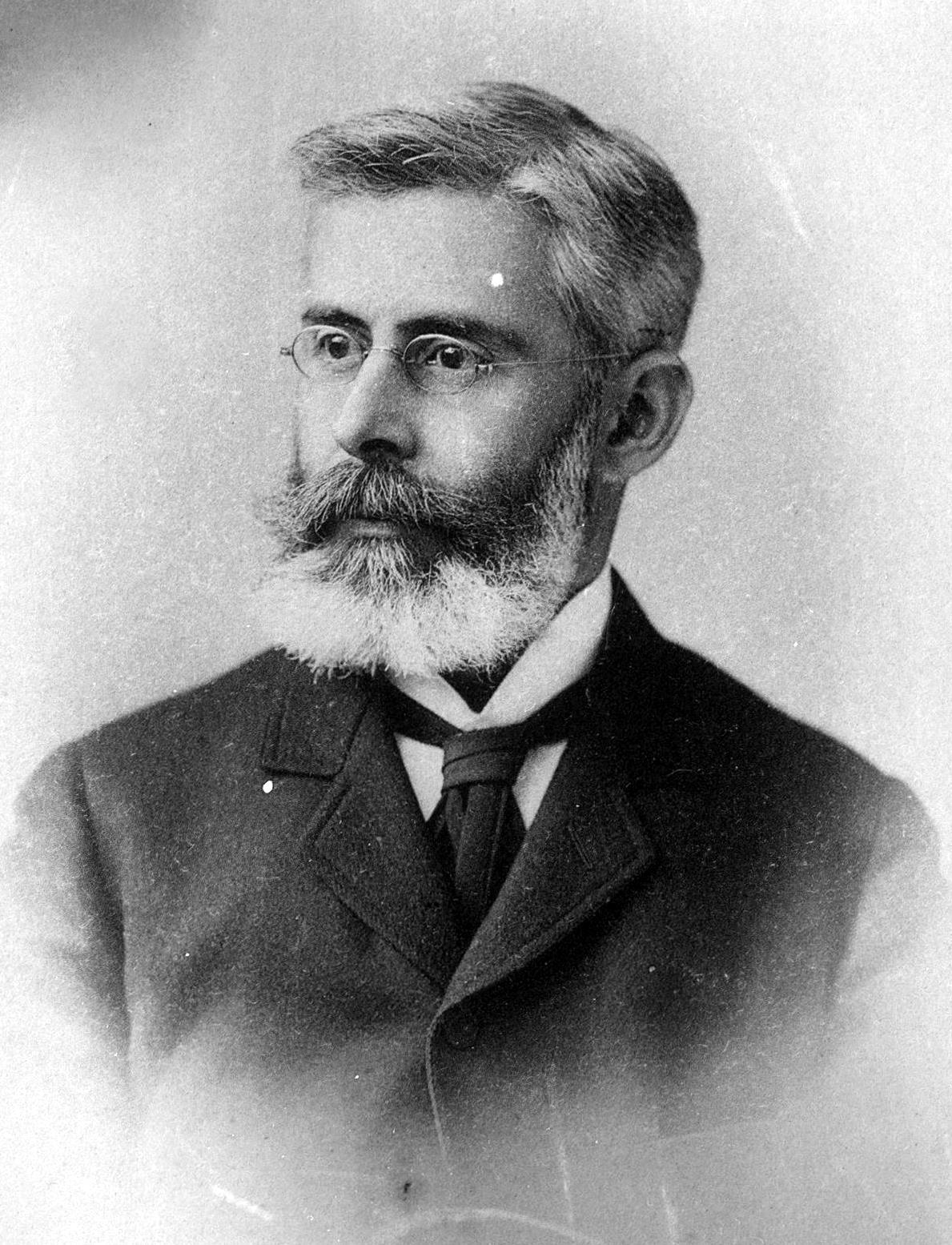

Juan Guitéras y Gener (or Juan Guiteras) (January 4, 1852 – October 28, 1925), was a Cuban physician and pathologist specializing in yellow fever.

Guiteras studied medicine at the University of Havana, and moved to the United States in 1873 to attend the University of Pennsylvania, and graduated that same year. He worked at Philadelphia Hospital until 1879, when he went into the U.S. Navy as a physician and began to research yellow fever, working with Stanford Chaillé and George Miller Sternberg in the Havana Yellow Fever Commission. On May 5, 1883 he married Dolores Gener in Cuba. He then taught at the Medical University of South Carolina from 1884 to 1888, and then taught at the University of Pennsylvania from 1889 to 1898. In 1893, he served as an Assistant Secretary-General at the first Pan-American Medical Congress. When the Spanish–American War broke out, Guiteras went to Cuba with the U.S. Army and joined the yellow fever research team led by William C. Gorgas.

Around this same time, Carlos Finlay and Walter Reed discovered that the Aedes mosquito was the disease vector for yellow fever. Guiteras confirmed Finlay's results and collaborated with him to help eradicate Aedes from Cuba, reducing the incidence of yellow fever there. In 1900 he became chair of the Pathology and Tropical Diseases department at the University of Havana and founded the Journal of Tropical Medicine. In 1902 he became director of the Cuban Department of Public Health and continued research in pathology. He was a member of the Yellow Fever Commission of the International Health Board in 1916.

== Bibliography ==
- Guiteras, John; White, J. William (1880). A contribution to the history of influenza : a study of a series of cases. Reprinted from The Philadelphia medical times, April 10, 1880. Philadelphia: Lippincott.
- Recent Discoveries on Malaria and the Mosquito (1900)
- Guiteras, John (1901). "Experimental yellow fever at the inoculation station of the Sanitary Department of Havana with a view to producing immunization". American Medicine. 2 (21): 809–817.
- Chappe, Aceotapia mutilans (1904)
- Cartas sobre el cólera (Letters on the cholera) (1911)
- Selección de los trabajos del doctor Finley (Selected works of Dr. Finley (1911)
- Guiteras, Juan (1914). La peste bubónica en Cuba. Habana: La Moderna poesia. English translation Bubonic plague in Cuba published in 1915.
- Insect Borne Diseases (1916)
