= Aristides Agramonte =

Cuban physician, pathologist, and bacteriologist (1868–1931)

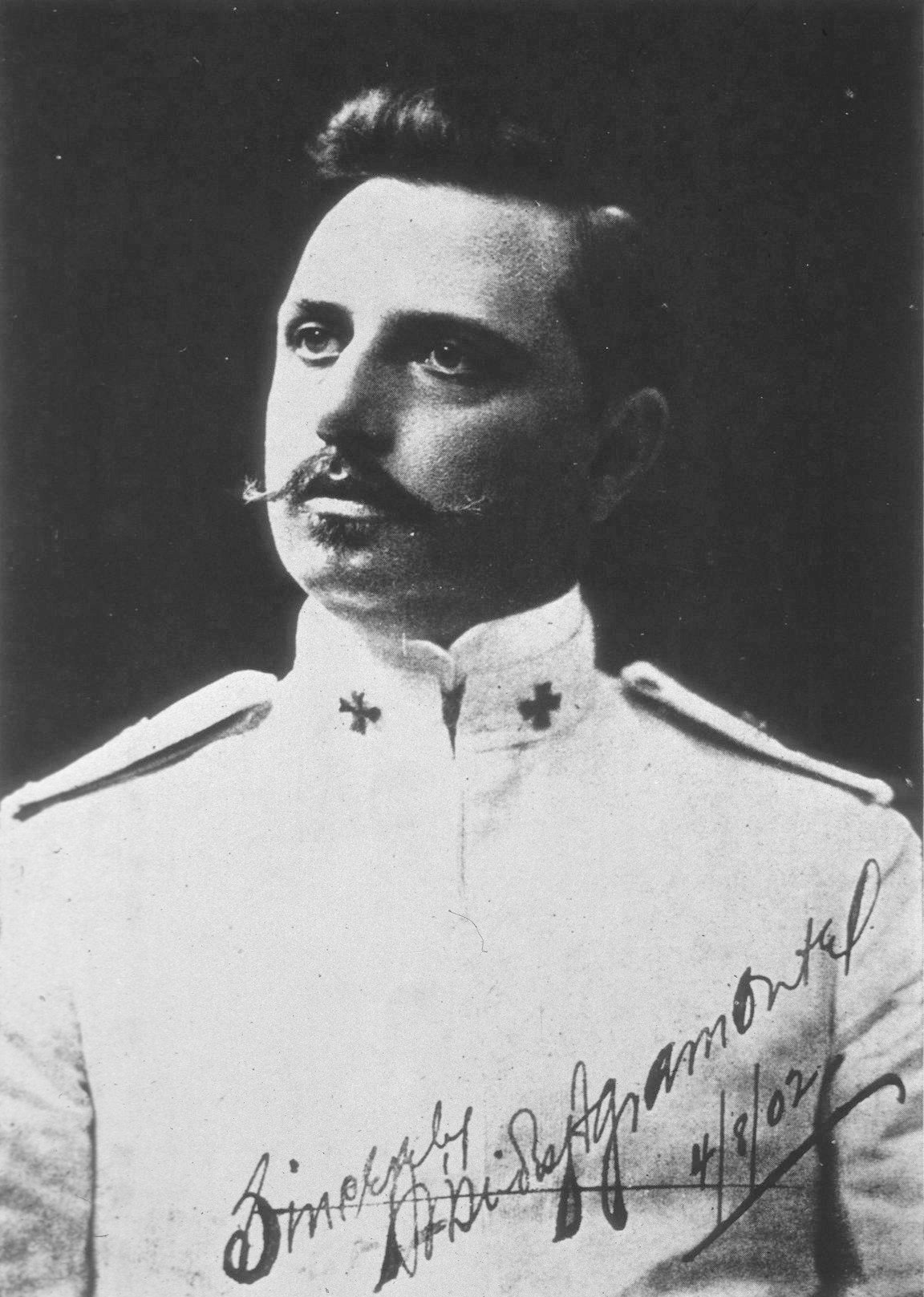
- Aristides Agramonte
- Born: June 3, 1868; Camagüey, Cuba
- Died: August 19, 1931 (aged 63); New Orleans, Louisiana, United States
- Known for: Yellow fever
- Scientific career
- Fields: bacteriology
- Workplaces: University of Havana

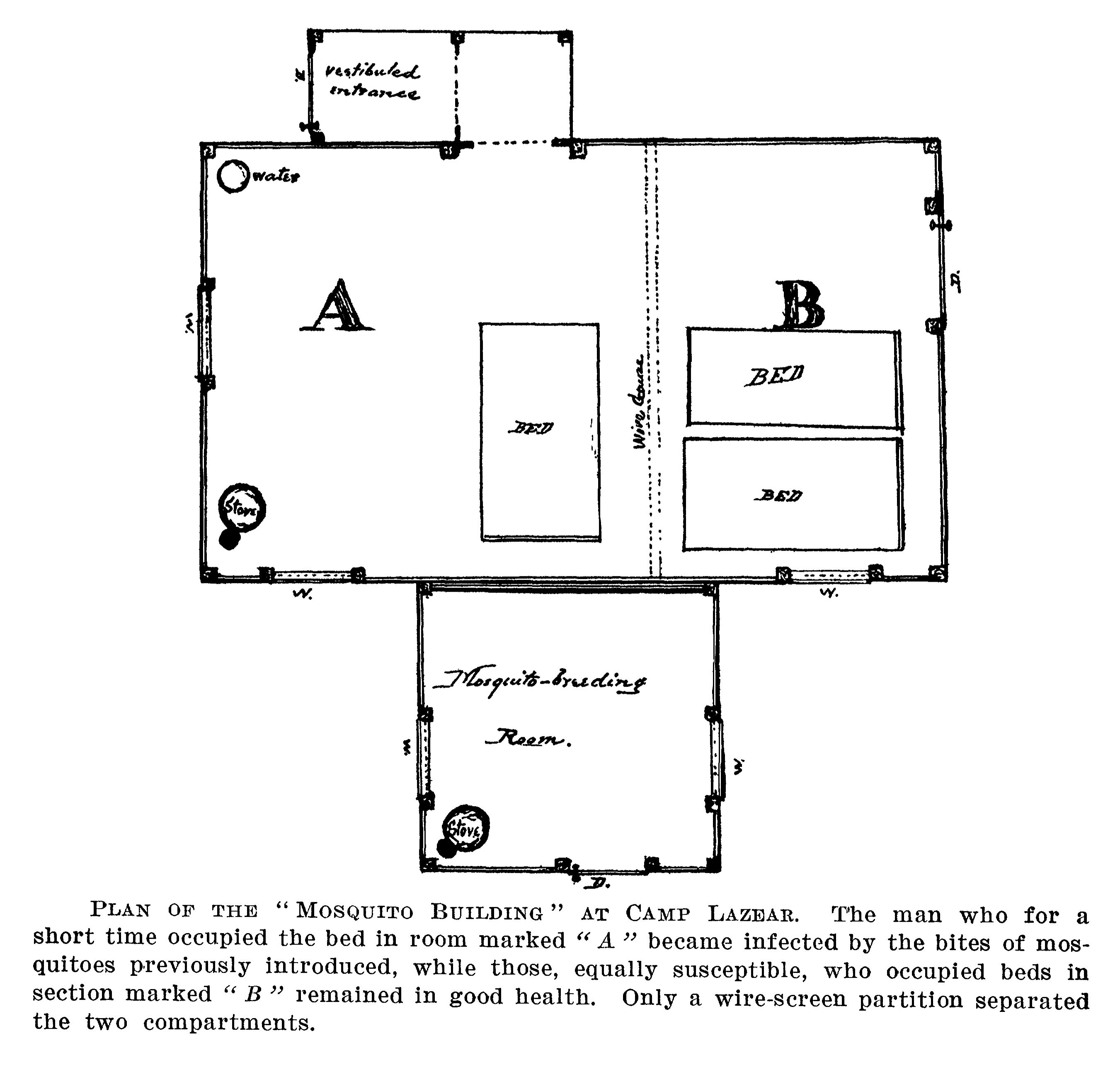
The mosquito building at Camp Lazear, Cuba. From Agramonte (1915)

Aristides Agramonte y Simoni (June 3, 1868 – August 19, 1931) was a Cuban American physician, pathologist and bacteriologist with expertise in tropical medicine. In 1898 George Miller Sternberg appointed him as an Acting Assistant Surgeon in the U.S. Army and sent him to Cuba to study a yellow fever outbreak. He later served on the Yellow Fever Commission, a U.S. Army Commission led by Walter Reed which examined the transmission of yellow fever.

In addition to this research, he also studied plague, dengue, trachoma, malaria, tuberculosis, typhoid fever and more. After serving on the Yellow Fever Commission, he served as a professor at the University of Havana as well as many government positions.

== See also ==
- James Carroll
- Carlos J. Finlay
- Jesse William Lazear
- Walter Reed

== Publications ==
- Agramonte, Aristides (1900). "Report of Bacteriological Investigations upon Yellow Fever". The Medical News. 76 (6): 203–212.
- Reed, W.; Carroll, J.; Agramonte, A.; Lazear, J.W. (1900). "The Etiology of Yellow Fever-A Preliminary Note". Public Health Pap Rep. 26: 37–53. PMC 2329228. PMID 19600960.
- Reed, W.; Carroll, J.; Agramonte, A. (1901). "Experimental yellow fever". American Medicine. 2 (1): 1–15.
- Reed, W.; Carroll, J.; Agramonte, A. (1901). "The etiology of yellow fever : An additional note". Journal of the American Medical Association. 36 (7): 431–440. doi:10.1001/jama.1901.52470070017001f. Reprinted by the Journal in 1983: Reed, W.; Agramonte, A. (1983), "Landmark article. Feb 16, 1901: The etiology of yellow fever. An additional note", JAMA, vol. 250, no. 5, pp. 649–58, doi:10.1001/jama.250.5.649, PMID 6345833
- Agramonte, Aristides (1915). "The Inside History of a Great Medical Discovery". The Scientific Monthly. 1 (3): 209–237. Bibcode:1915SciMo...1..209A.
