= Belroi, Virginia =

Unincorporated community in Virginia, US

Coordinates: 37°23′15″N 76°35′17″W

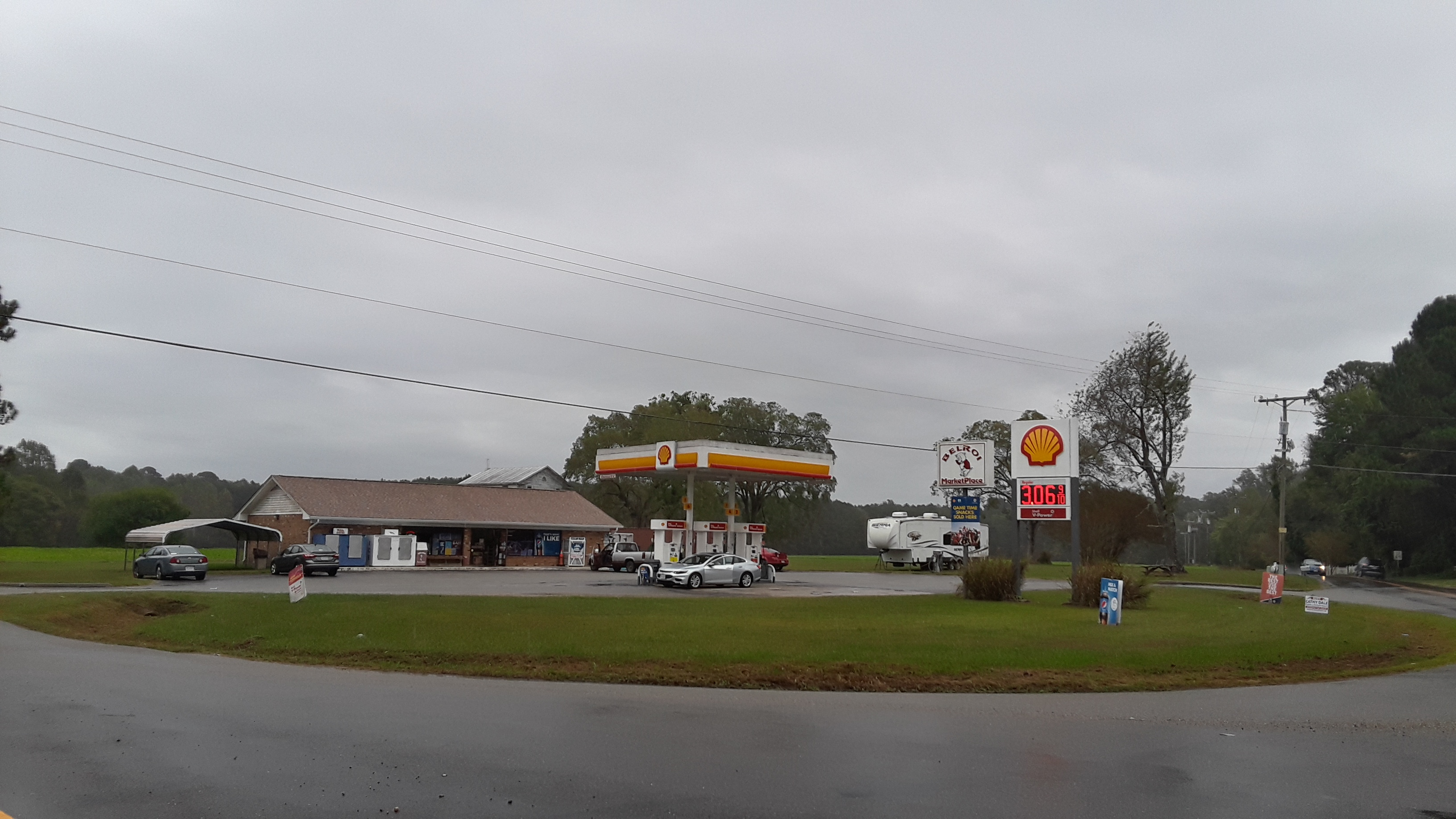
Belroi Market in October 2021

Belroi is an unincorporated community in Gloucester County, in the U.S. state of Virginia.

== Notable people ==
- Walter Reed (1851–1902), a US Army physician who in 1900 led the team that postulated and confirmed the theory that yellow fever is transmitted by a particular mosquito species, rather than by direct contact. This insight gave impetus to the new fields of epidemiology and biomedicine. He is also the namesake for Walter Reed National Military Medical Center in Bethesda, Maryland and the predecessor Walter Reed Army Medical Center in Washington, DC. The Walter Reed Birthplace was added to the National Register of Historic Places in 1973.
