= James Carroll (scientist) =

American scientist (1854–1907)

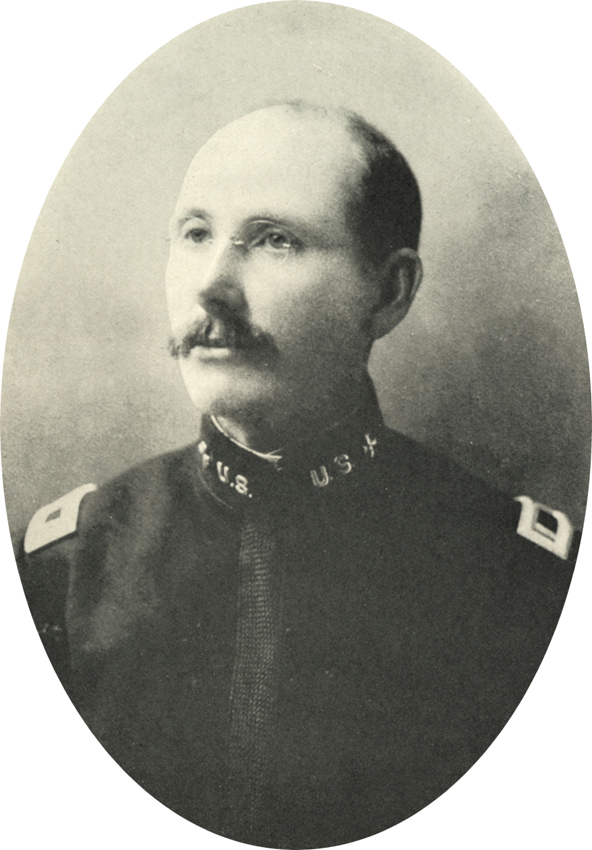
- James Carroll
- Born: June 5, 1854; Woolwich, England
- Died: September 16, 1907 (aged 53); Washington, D.C.
- Resting place: Arlington National Cemetery
- Education: University of Maryland

Major James Carroll (June 5, 1854 – September 16, 1907) was a US Army physician.

Carroll was born in England. He moved to Canada in 1874, and enlisted in the U.S. Army in 1874. He graduated with an M.D. from the University of Maryland School of Medicine in 1891. After graduating Carroll studied bacteriology under Dr. William H. Welch at Johns Hopkins Hospital and assisted Walter Reed in pathology laboratories. Carroll and Reed later worked together at the Army Medical Museum in Washington and the Columbia University Medical School.

In 1900 he served as an American physician and a member of the Yellow Fever Commission in Cuba, along with Walter Reed, Jesse William Lazear, and Aristides Agramonte. He and Lazear subjected themselves to the bite of infectious mosquitoes to test the theory that mosquitoes were carriers of yellow fever. Carroll contracted yellow fever, experiencing symptoms such as a high fever, intense pain, and fatigue. Although he recovered, the illness left heart damage, leading to heart failure seven years later. Lazear died 17 days after the experiment began due to complications from yellow fever. The exact origin of Carroll’s yellow fever infection, whether from the mosquito bite or prior exposure to affected patients, remains uncertain. After recovering, Caroll completed the last, official experiments of the Yellow Fever Commission. After a trip to Washington D.C., Carroll returned to Cuba for additional studies in which he proved that blood from active cases of yellow fever contained sub-microscopic infective agents. In 1904, with permission from Army Surgeon-General Robert Maitland O'Reilly, Carroll tested an oral typhoid fever vaccine on himself and 12 other volunteers from the military. Due to faulty vaccine preparation by lab personnel, seven men came down with the disease. They all survived, but the Office of the Surgeon General did not publicize the results. Although, Carroll recovered from the initial yellow fever infection, his heart was irreparably damaged, and he died just seven years later.

Carroll was the inaugural president of the United States and Canadian Academy of Pathology.

He was buried at Arlington National Cemetery, in Arlington, Virginia.

Carroll is a character in Sidney Howard's 1934 play Yellow Jack. In stage, film, and television productions he has been portrayed by such actors as Barton MacLane (original 1934 Broadway cast), George Reeves (1944, Broadway), Victor Jory (1947, Broadway), Stanley Ridges (1938 feature film), Macdonald Carey (1952 television), Dennis O'Keefe (1955 television), and Alfred Burke (1956 television).
