= Walter L. Reed =

Career United States Army officer

Walter Lawrence Reed
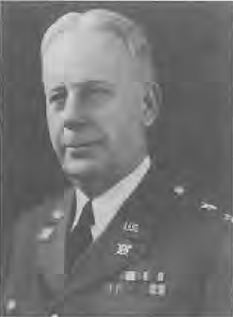
- Born: 4 December 1877; Fort Apache, Arizona
- Died: 1 May 1956 (aged 78); Walter Reed Army Medical Center Washington, DC
- Burial place: Arlington National Cemetery
- Relatives: Major Walter Reed, (father)
- Military career
- Allegiance: United States of America
- Branch: United States Army
- Service years: 1898–1940; 1942–1946
- Rank: Major General
- Nickname: Lawrence
- Commands: Company A, 10th Infantry Regiment; Company C, 10th Infantry Regiment; Company M, 10th Infantry Regiment; 12th Infantry Regiment
- Conflicts: Spanish–American War; World War I World War II
- Awards: Distinguished Service Medal with 1 Oak Leaf Cluster

Walter Lawrence Reed (4 December 1877 – 1 May 1956) was a major general in the United States Army who served as Inspector General of the Army from 1 December 1935 to 23 December 1939. His father was Army Medical Corps officer Major Walter Reed, namesake of the Walter Reed Army Medical Center. He was born in Fort Apache, Arizona, and moved to Washington, D.C., where he spent most of his early life. Reed fought in the Spanish–American War and traveled across the country and to the Panama Canal Zone. He then began working as an inspector during World War I and became the inspector of Base Section Number 5 in February 1919 then worked in the American Expeditionary Forces office. For his work he earned the Distinguished Service Medal. Reed attended various military schools before returning to the Inspector General's department. In 1935 he became the inspector general of the United States Army. He retired in 1940, but was recalled to active duty during World War II, filling a role in the War Department until 1946. Reed died in the Walter Reed Army Medical Center in 1956.

== Early life ==
Reed was born in Fort Apache, Arizona, on 4 December 1877, to parents Walter Reed, an Army Medical Corps officer, and Emilie Lawrence. He had two sisters, Emilie and Susie. He traveled with his family, being educated in the District of Columbia Public Schools and at the Randolph Macon Academy. Reed then worked in Washington, D.C. for several years as the bookkeeper of a fuel dealer.

== Early military service ==
Reed applied for a direct commission in early 1898, but upon the outbreak of the Spanish–American War on 17 June 1898, he enlisted in C Battery, 2nd Artillery, at Washington Barracks. He served at Fort Warren in Massachusetts, rising to the rank of a quartermaster sergeant. After three months, the battery was deployed to serve in the occupation of Cuba. In May 1899, Reed was transferred to N Battery as a first sergeant. He applied for a commission in 1900. With the support of his battery and regiment commanders, George M. Sternberg, Joseph Wheeler, and Leonard Wood, he was commissioned a second lieutenant in the 10th Infantry Regiment on 25 July. While there, Reed met Eli A. Helmick, with whom he developed a close friendship. He married Lucy Landon Carter Blackford in 1901. They had two children, Landon Carter and Mary Berkeley.

In February 1901, the regiment left Cuba, and at Fort Robinson in Nebraska he was made quartermaster and commissary of the 2nd Battalion. In March, the unit was deployed to the Philippines, participated in the Lake Lanao operations, and was garrisoned at Cotabato City. At Cotabato City, Reed served as provost and town treasurer. He was then reassigned to Company G on ll December 1902 and returned to the Presidio of San Francisco in February 1903. Reed was promoted to first lieutenant in January 1904 and took command of Company M in April. In June he took command of Company A at Fort Lawton in Washington.

Reed next commanded a training company and escorted groups to their new units at Columbus Barracks, Ohio, from February 1906 until rejoining his regiment in August 1908 at Fort Benjamin Harrison in Indiana. Before being made a post exchange officer in December, he was a regimental and post adjutant. As post exchange officer, he oversaw a retail store, a farm, and a dairy. Reed was assigned to Company C in June 1910. Until the unit was transferred to Fort Sam Houston in Texas, in March 1911, he periodically served as post or unit adjutant as well as continuing to overseeing the post exchange. From March to June the unit was part of the Maneuver Division and in September it was stationed at Camp E. S. Otis in the Panama Canal Zone. While there, Reed served as the company executive, managing its funds and mess. Inspectors of the camp credited him with "excellent business sense." After being promoted to captain in April 1914, Reed assumed command of the company in July. In October, he returned to the United States.

== Later military service ==
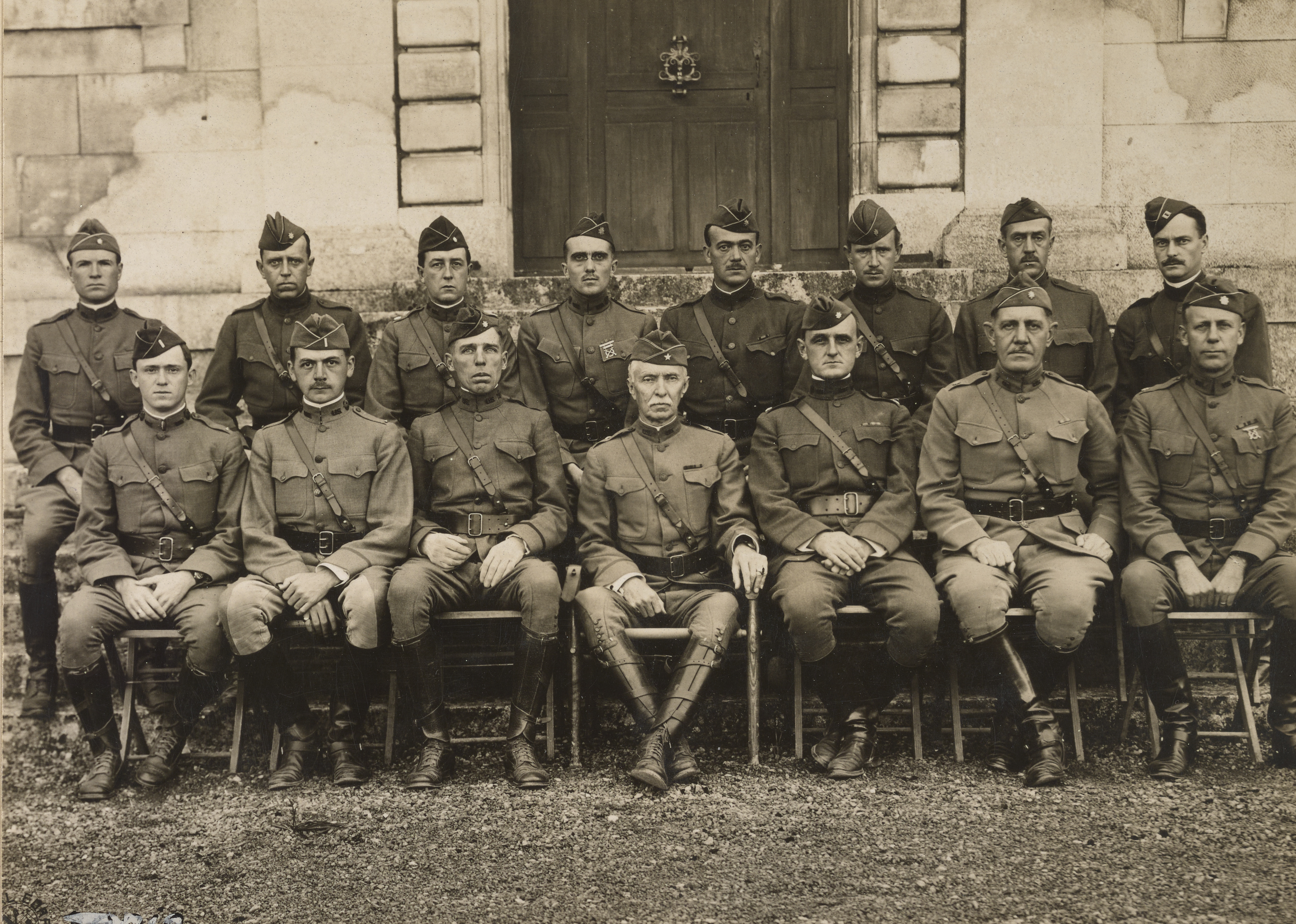
Brigadier General Charles H. Barth (seated in the center), commanding the 7th Division, along with members of his divisional staff at Ancy-le-Franc, Yonne, France, September 15, 1918. Sat on the extreme right is Lieutenant Colonel Walter L. Reed, the division's inspector.

In late 1914, Reed was assigned as an inspector-instructor to the New Jersey National Guard in Newark. Reed was successful in the role and elected major of the 4th New Jersey Infantry in 1916 (though he could not accept because it was a state commission, the governor issued the rank as an honor). Upon beginning the build-up in 1916 for the United States' entry into World War I, Reed was placed on several inspector teams, observing mobilized National Guard units in Florida and Georgia. By the end of the year Reed was a mustering officer, originally demobilizing New Jersey units, but by early 1917 he began recalling units. In July he was made a temporary major and remained with the Guard until October when he was assigned to the Inspector General's Department in Washington, D.C.

In May 1918, he was promoted to temporary lieutenant colonel and assigned as the inspector of the 7th Division at Camp MacArthur in Texas. The unit deployed to France in September, and in October Reed became assistant inspector of the Second Army. In February 1919, at the request of Major General Eli Hemlick, commander of Base Section Number 5 in Brest, France, he was transferred to the section. Hemlick praised Reed, saying he "did more than any other staff officer to bring order out of the chaos that existed in the camp during the early days." He was appointed to temporary colonel in May and moved to the American Expeditionary Forces Inspector General office after the base section closed. He eventually became the inspector of the American Expeditionary Forces in France. For his work, he received the Army Distinguished Service Medal. In 1920, he returned to the United States and became a permanent lieutenant colonel in July.

Over the next seven years, Reed attended the School of the Line in 1921, the General Staff School in 1922, the Army War College in 1923, and the Naval War College in 1924. He was then an instructor at the Naval War College until June 1928 when he was assigned as the executive officer of the 29th Infantry Division at Fort Benning, Georgia. In May 1930, Reed was made a full colonel. He received command of the 12th Infantry Regiment at Fort Howard in Maryland in January 1933.

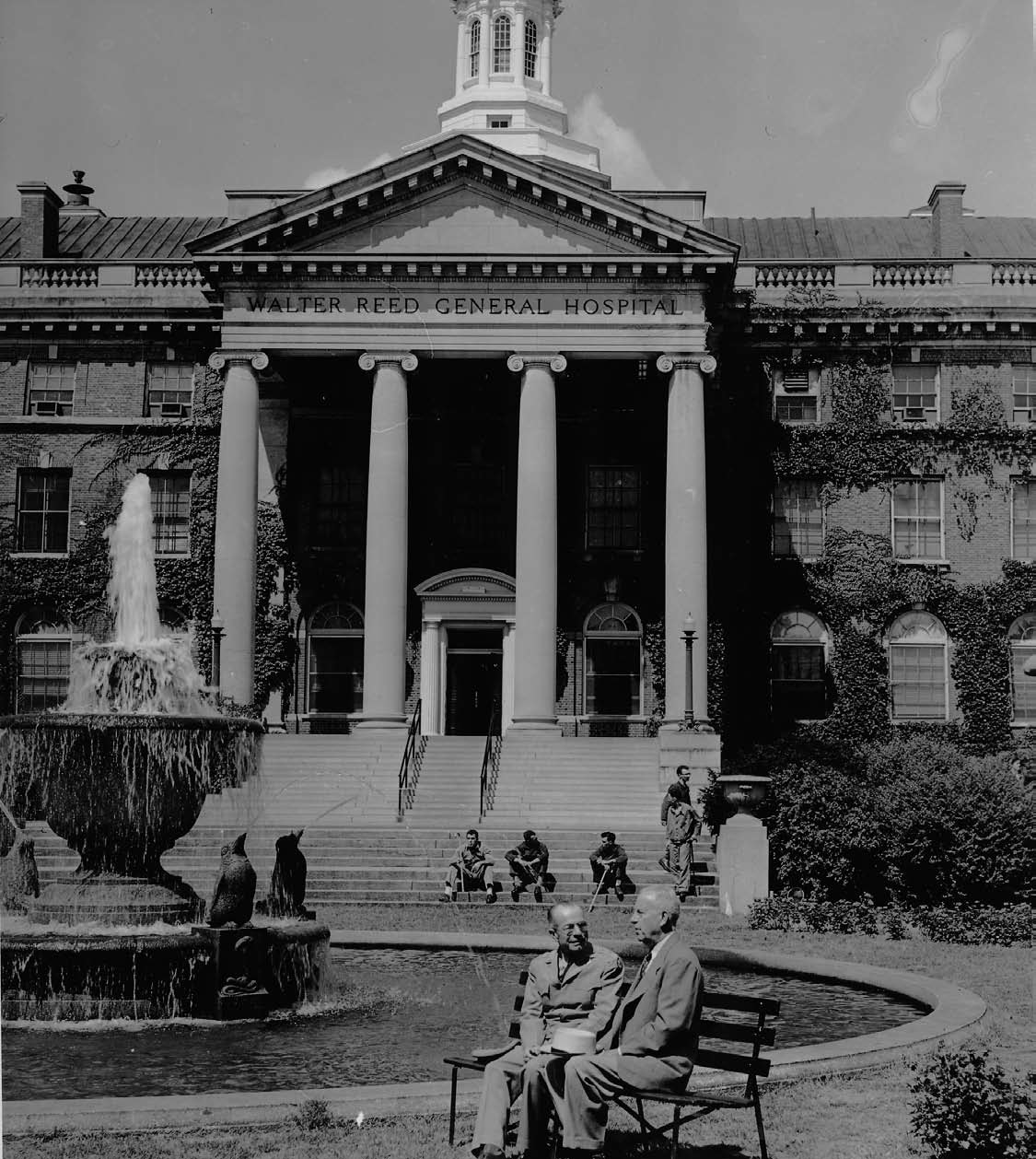
Major General Walter L. Reed with Major General Streit, Commander of the Walter Reed General Hospital, named for Reed's father

Reed was in command until being detailed to the Inspector General's Department as executive officer in October 1934. His investigations included Benjamin Foulois and the Army Air Force and accusations of bribery against Alexander E. Williams. Reed was appointed Inspector General on 1 December 1935, replacing John F. Preston. As inspector general, Reed requested an additional brigadier general for the department due to its rapidly increasing caseload in 1937. The same year he was involved in identifying areas for manpower reductions in the army. Reed also investigated various U.S. property and disbursing officers for embezzlement. He toured until 23 December 1939 and retired 30 April 1940. In April 1942 Reed was recalled to active duty as a member of the War Department Personnel Board. In 1945, Reed received an oak leave cluster in lieu of a second Distinguished Service Medal "for exceptionally meritorious and distinguished services to the Government of the United States, in a duty of great responsibility." He retired on 25 June 1946, and lived in Washington, DC until his death on 1 May 1956. Reed is buried in Arlington National Cemetery.
