= Health measures during the construction of the Panama Canal =

One of the greatest challenges facing the builders of the Panama Canal was dealing with the tropical diseases rife in the area. The health measures taken during the construction contributed greatly to the success of the canal's construction. These included general health care, the provision of an extensive health infrastructure, and a major program to eradicate disease-carrying mosquitoes from the area.

== Background ==
=== US control ===
William Crawford Gorgas, Chief Sanitary Officer to the Isthmian Commission

By the time the United States took control of the Panama Canal project on May 4, 1904, the Isthmus of Panama was notorious for tropical diseases. An estimated 12,000 workers had died during the construction of the Panama Railway and over 22,000 during the French effort to build a canal.

The high rate of deaths among workers on the Panama Canal due to disease was the source of a great deal of controversy in the United States. Newspapers, such as The Independent, frequently reported on the poor conditions workers in the Canal Zone experienced, including the rampant disease. Poultney Bigelow wrote an article in The Independent in 1906 critiquing the work on the Panama Canal, which was highly influential with the American public. Among other topics, Bigelow brought attention to the poor living conditions of the workers, including pools of standing water where mosquitoes could breed and spread disease from.

It was clear to organizers of the American effort that previous disease control efforts had been largely ineffective. Traditionally, yellow fever had been thought to be caused by contact with filth and malaria by noxious vapors. However, between 1897 and 1902, both diseases were shown to be spread by mosquitoes, following research by Cuban epidemiologist Carlos Finlay, American pathologist Walter Reed and Scottish physician Sir Ronald Ross.

== The Sanitation effort ==
The Panama Canal Commission appointed Colonel William Crawford Gorgas in March 1904 as head of hospitals and sanitation. Under his leadership, many new departments of sanitation were founded, covering different aspects of the sanitation problem. Commissions were also formed to look after the basic welfare of laborers.

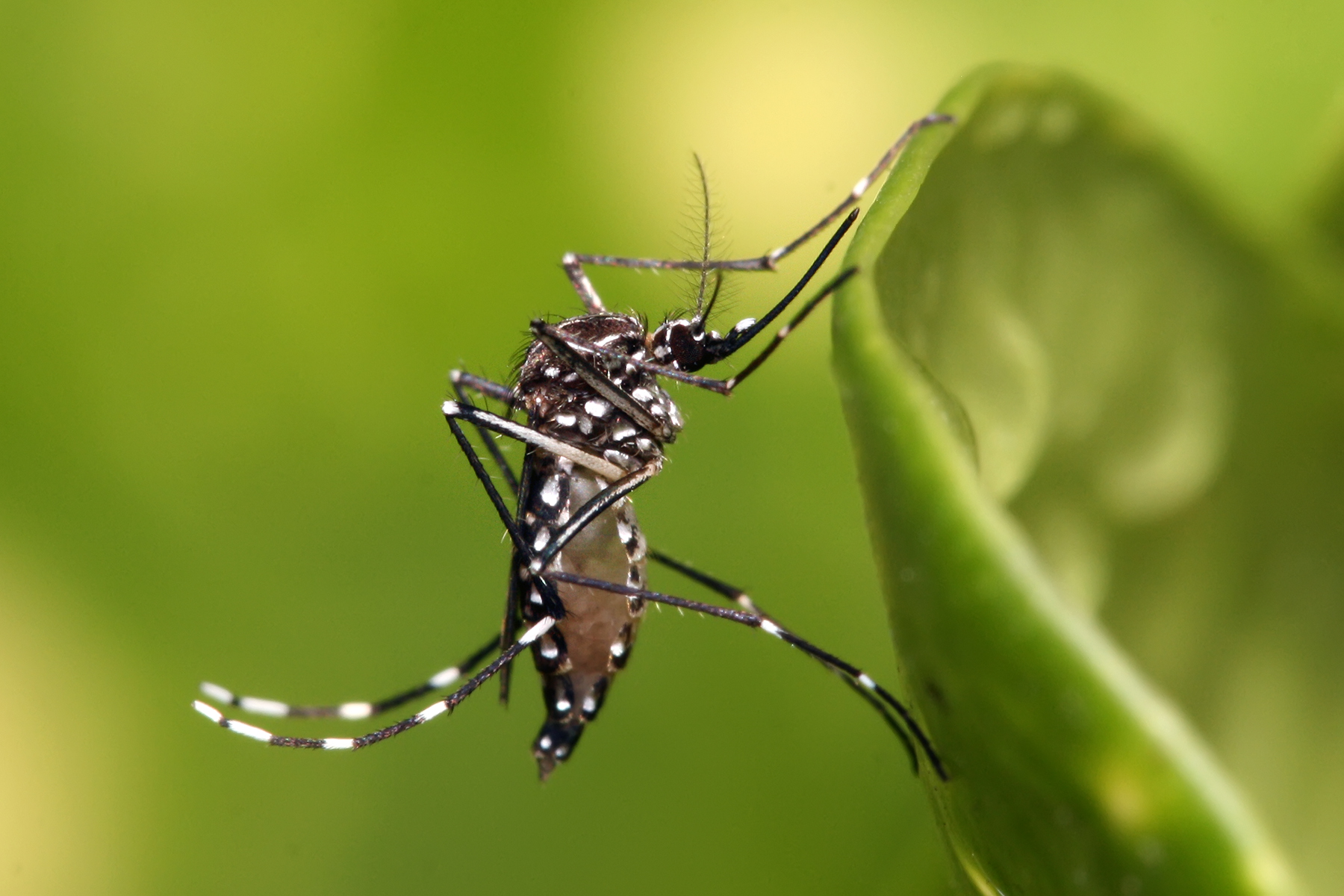
Aedes aegypti, the mosquito vector of yellow fever.

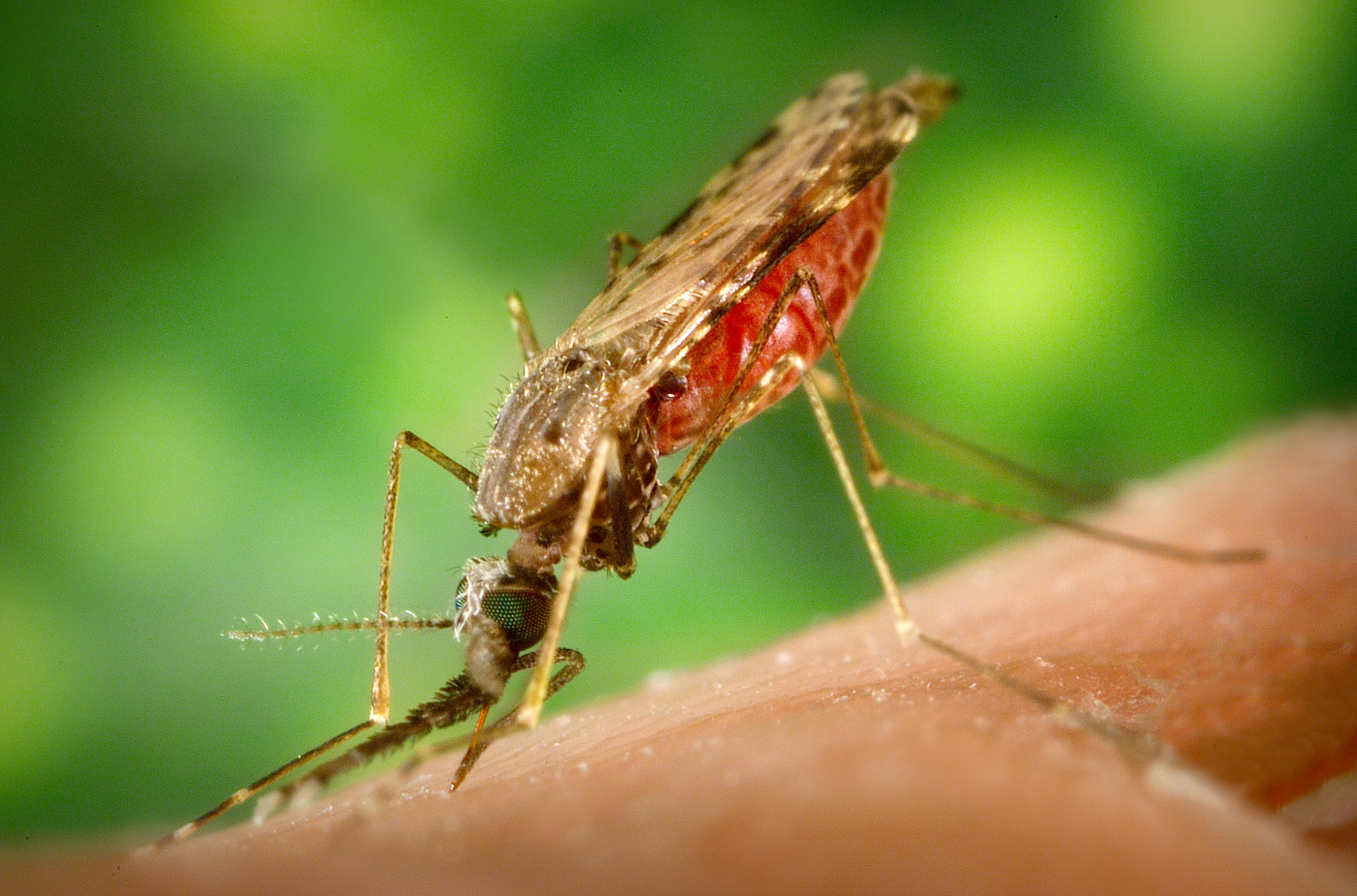
Anopheles albimanus, a common mosquito vector of the malaria parasite.

The sanitation work included clearing land and establishing quarantine facilities. The most ambitious part of the sanitation program, though, was undoubtedly the effort to eradicate the mosquitoes Aedes aegypti and Anopheles, the carriers of yellow fever and malaria, respectively, from the canal zone. There was initially considerable resistance to this program, as the "mosquito theory" was still considered controversial and unproven. However, with the support of chief engineer John Frank Stevens, who took over the post on July 26, 1905, Gorgas was finally able to put his ideas into action.

Gorgas divided Panama into 11 districts, and Colón, Panama, into four. In each district, inspectors searched houses and buildings for mosquito larvae. If larvae were found, carpenters were dispatched to the building, and work was done to eliminate objects or places where stagnant water could collect.

Mosquitoes lay their eggs on the surface of standing water, and when the larvae hatch, they live just below the surface, breathing through a siphon in their tails. Therefore, by eliminating standing water where possible and by spreading oil on the surface of any remaining pools, the larvae could be destroyed.

Gorgas also had domestic water systems installed in urban areas around the Canal Zone. These systems eliminated the need for rainwater collection, which had been collected in barrels and was a place for mosquitoes to breed. The United States government also provided $20 million to give workers free medical care and burial services. Gorgas's sanitation department also provided about one ton of prophylactic quinine each year to people in the Canal Zone to combat malaria.

Gorgas organized a major program to drain and fill swamps and wetlands around the Canal Zone. Many miles of ditches were dug, and grass and brush were cut back over wide areas. Oiling was used in a variety of means: workers with spray tanks were sent to spray oil on standing pools, and smaller streams were tackled by placing a dripping oil can over the waterway, which created a film of oil over each still patch of water in the stream. About 700,000 gallons of oil and 124,000 gallons of larvicide were used on the project. Gorgas also took another step in his efforts to eradicate mosquitoes in Panama: fumigation. He fumigated the residences of Panamanians who had been confirmed to have contracted yellow fever. "Pans of sulfur or pyrethrum were then placed in the rooms, the right quantity of powder was weighed out (two pounds per thousand cubic feet), and the pans were sprinkled with wood-alcohol and set alight." When the effectiveness of this procedure was realized, fumigation was extended to all of Panama. Within a year of Stevens's appointment, every building in Panama had been fumigated, using up the entire US supply of sulfur and pyrethrum. In 1906, only one case of yellow fever was reported, and by the end of the Panama Canal's construction, there were zero every year.

Gorgas's final means of attack on disease was to quarantine individuals infected with yellow fever or malaria from the rest of the workforce. Those who were diagnosed with either disease were put into "Portable Fever Cages", easily transportable screened structures used to prevent mosquitoes from biting an infected person and carrying the disease to others. Gorgas also had the thousands of canal workers sleep in screened verandas, as the mosquitoes that spread malaria are nocturnal and would infect the most people at night.

== Outcome ==
The first two and a half years of the American canal effort were substantially dedicated to preparation, much of it making the area fit for large-scale human habitation. A significant part of this was the sanitation program put in place by Gorgas. Nearly $20 million was spent on health and sanitation during the ten years.

Gorgas continuously faced opposition because of the cost- and manpower-intensive nature of the eradication work, as well as entrenched ideas that mosquitoes were irrelevant to disease spread. At one stage, Theodore P. Shonts, head of the commission responsible for the canal, requested U.S. President Theodore Roosevelt to remove Gorgas from the project because of his costly obsession with mosquitoes. Roosevelt asked advice from two leading physicians in the U.S. He was told that he had a choice between Shonts and Gorgas, and that he would get his canal if he supported Gorgas. Thereafter, Roosevelt gave Gorgas his full backing.

In the end, these efforts were a success: by 1906, yellow fever was virtually wiped out in the Canal Zone, and the number of deaths caused by the other tropical disease, malaria, was also reduced significantly. The hospitals maintained were by far the best to be found anywhere in the tropics; some 32,000 patients were treated per year.

While disease reduction dramatically improved the health of white workers, black workers—the majority of the canal workforce—continued to die in large numbers, at ten times the rate of white workers in 1906. While medical care was provided to all, housing was not provided to workers, many of whom had to live in tents and tenements outside the mosquito-controlled zone. In the end, 350 white workers and 4,500 black workers had died. While the loss was tragic, it was far less than during the French era.

Today, the Panama canal area is regarded as free of yellow fever and malaria.
