= Yellow Jack =

1938 film by George B. Seitz

- Directed by: George B. Seitz
- Written by: Sidney Howard (play); Paul de Kruif (play collaborator); Edward Chodorov (screenplay)
- Based on: Yellow Jack by Sidney Howard and Paul de Kruif
- Produced by: Jack Cummings
- Starring: Robert Montgomery; Virginia Bruce; Lewis Stone; Sam Levene; Andy Devine; Henry Hull; Charles Coburn; Buddy Ebsen
- Cinematography: Lester White
- Edited by: Blanche Sewell
- Music by: William Axt
- Distributed by: Metro-Goldwyn-Mayer
- Release date: May 19, 1938 (New York)
- Running time: 83 minutes
- Country: United States
- Language: English

Yellow Jack is a 1938 film released by Metro-Goldwyn-Mayer based on the 1934 play Yellow Jack. Both were cowritten by screenwriter Sidney Howard and Paul de Kruif, a microbiologist and author.

== Plot ==
Major Walter Reed of the United States Army works to diagnose and treat yellow fever (called “yellow jack”) in Cuba at the end of the 19th century. U.S. Army Medical Corps doctors study the theory of Cuban doctor Carlos Finlay that the disease is caused by bites from infected Aedes aegypti mosquitoes, a concept that had previously been ridiculed. Soldiers volunteer to be research subjects by allowing themselves to be bitten and contract the deadly disease, for which no cure was known.

== Cast ==
- Robert Montgomery as John O'Hara
- Virginia Bruce as Frances Blake
- Lewis Stone as Major Walter Reed
- Andy Devine as Charlie Spill
- Henry Hull as Dr. Jesse Lazear
- Charles Coburn as Dr. Carlos Finlay
- Buddy Ebsen as 'Jellybeans'
- Henry O'Neill as Dr. William Gorgas
- Janet Beecher as Miss Macdade
- William Henry as Breen
- Alan Curtis as Brinkerhof
- Sam Levene as Busch
- Stanley Ridges as Dr. James Carroll
- Phillip Terry as Ferguson
- Jonathan Hale as Major General Leonard Wood

== Production ==
The original Broadway play, which opened in 1934, was produced and directed by Guthrie McClintic and costarred James Stewart and Sam Levene. Stewart's performance as Sergeant John O'Hara attracted the attention of Hollywood along with an MGM contract. However, when Yellow Jack was filmed, Stewart was unavailable and replaced by Robert Montgomery. Sam Levene was the only member of the original Broadway cast to also appear in the film.

== Reception ==
In a contemporary review for The New York Times, critic Frank S. Nugent wrote that the film "... is a superior job of picture making, well written, well directed and generally well played."

== Adaptations ==
The play and screenplay were adapted for television by Celanese Theatre (1952) and Producers' Showcase (1955), both in episodes titled Yellow Jack.

Yellow Jack was presented on the Philip Morris Playhouse radio show on September 5, 1941.
