= Walter Reed Birthplace =

Historic house in Virginia, United States

- U.S. National Register of Historic Places
- Virginia Landmarks Register
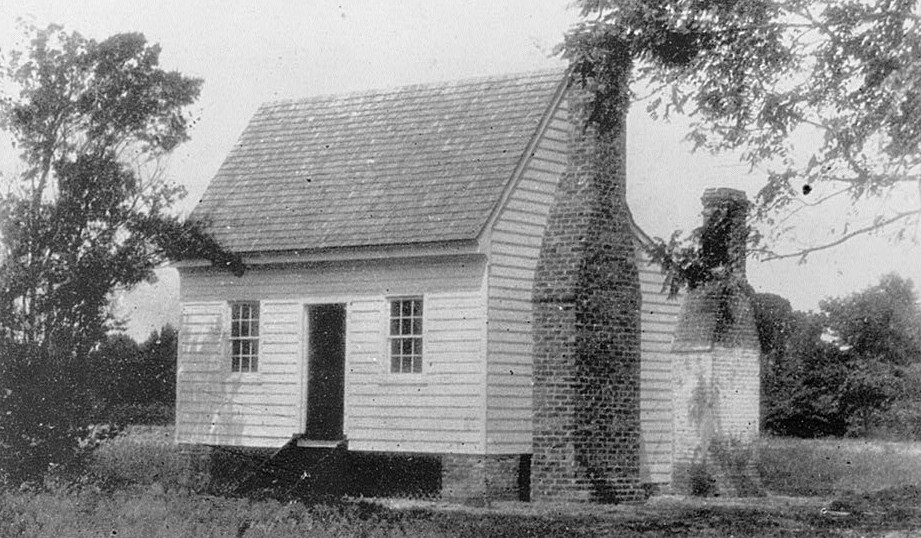
- Walter Reed Birthplace, HABS Photo

- Location within Virginia Location within the United States
- Location: S of jct. of U.S. 17 and VA 615, Belroi, Virginia
- Coordinates: 37°23′18″N 76°35′18″W
- Area: 9.9 acres (4.0 ha)
- Built: 1825
- NRHP reference No.: 73002017 (original); 15000906 (increase)
- VLR No.: 036-0080

Significant dates
- Added to NRHP: September 20, 1973
- Boundary increase: December 15, 2015
- Designated VLR: April 17, 1973

Walter Reed Birthplace is a historic home located near Belroi, Gloucester County, Virginia. It was built around 1825 and is a one-story, gable-roofed frame dwelling. It has a rear shed addition. The house was restored in 1927 and again in 1970. It was the birthplace of Dr. Walter Reed.

It was added to the National Register of Historic Places in 1973.

The house was restored by Preservation Virginia, and in 2013 was transferred to the care of the Gloucester Preservation Foundation. It is open by appointment.

In 2015, the updated site, with increased land boundaries, was nominated and re-added to the National Register of Historic Places.

== Gallery ==
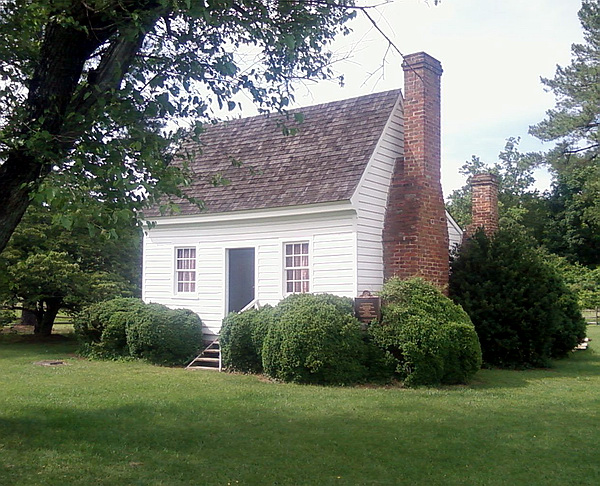
Walter Reed Birthplace, May 2008
