= Jesse William Lazear =

American physician

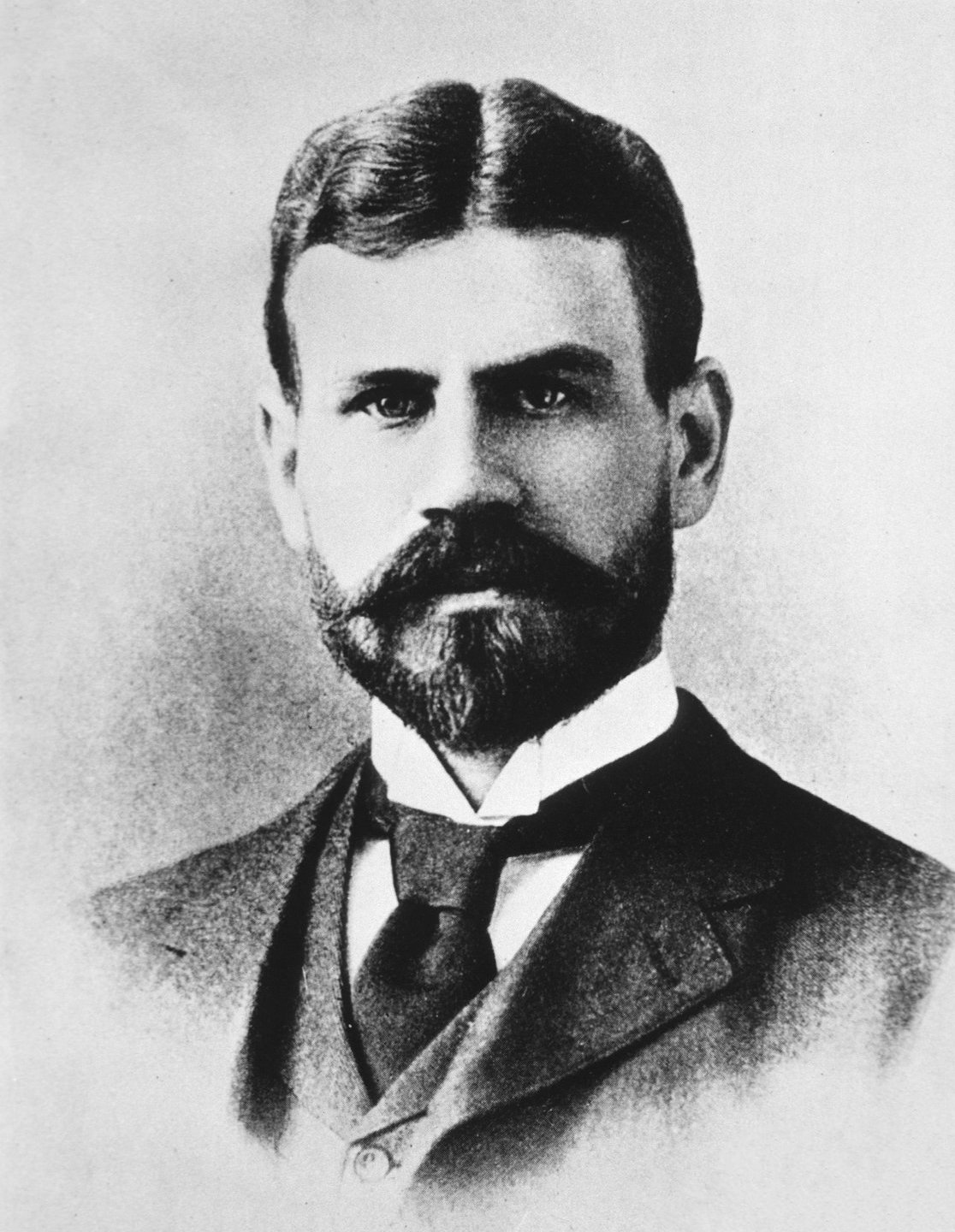
- Jesse William Lazear
- Born: May 2, 1866; Baltimore, Maryland, U.S.
- Died: September 25, 1900 (aged 34); Havana, Cuba
- Cause of death: Yellow fever
- Education: Columbia University College of Physicians and Surgeons; Johns Hopkins University; Washington & Jefferson College
- Spouse: Mabel Houston (m. 1896)
- Children: 2

Jesse William Lazear (May 2, 1866 – September 25, 1900) was an American physician. In 1900, he deliberately allowed a mosquito to bite him to test the hypothesis that mosquitoes were the vector for yellow fever transmission. He contracted the disease but did not recover and died on September 25, 1900.

== Background ==
Lazear was the son of William and Charlotte née Pettigrew. He attended Trinity Hall Military Academy and Washington & Jefferson College, both in Washington, Pennsylvania, and obtained his Bachelor of Arts in 1889 from Johns Hopkins University and his M.D. in 1892 from the Columbia University College of Physicians and Surgeons. He did his specialization in Paris at the Institut Pasteur. In 1896 he married Mabel Houston with whom he had two children. He was also a member of the Phi Kappa Psi fraternity.

== Career ==
Lazear was a physician at the Johns Hopkins Hospital in Baltimore starting in 1895, where he studied malaria and yellow fever. In 1900 he reported for duty as the assistant surgeon at Columbia Barracks (Quemados, Cuba) for the United States Army.

After a few months in Quemados, Lazear, together with Walter Reed, James Carroll and Aristides Agramonte, participated in a commission studying the transmission of yellow fever, the Yellow Fever Board. During his research at Camp Columbia, he confirmed the 1881 hypothesis of Carlos Finlay that mosquitoes transmitted this disease. Lazear was the only member of the commission who had experience working with mosquitoes, and he used mosquito larvae from Finlay's laboratory. He wrote to his wife in a letter dated September 8, 1900, "I rather think I am on the track of the real germ." Lazear deliberately allowed an infected mosquito to bite him in order to study the disease. He contracted the disease and died at age 34, seventeen days after writing his hopeful letter. The fact that this was a deliberate act was covered up at the time—for reasons unknown, but possibly connected with family insurance policies—and the story put about that Lazear had mistaken the mosquito for an uninfected one of a different species. The truth was discovered in 1947 by Philip S. Hench from Lazear's own notebook.

A dormitory at Johns Hopkins University was named after him in honor of his sacrifice, as was a former chemistry building at Washington & Jefferson College, Lazear's alma mater.

There is a memorial in the "Sacrifice" stained glass window at the altar of the War Memorial Chapel at the Washington National Cathedral dedicated to Jesse Lazear showing him, an injection needle and a mosquito.

== See also ==
- Human experimentation in the United States
