= Carlos Finlay =

Cuban epidemiologist, yellow fever researcher (1833-1914)

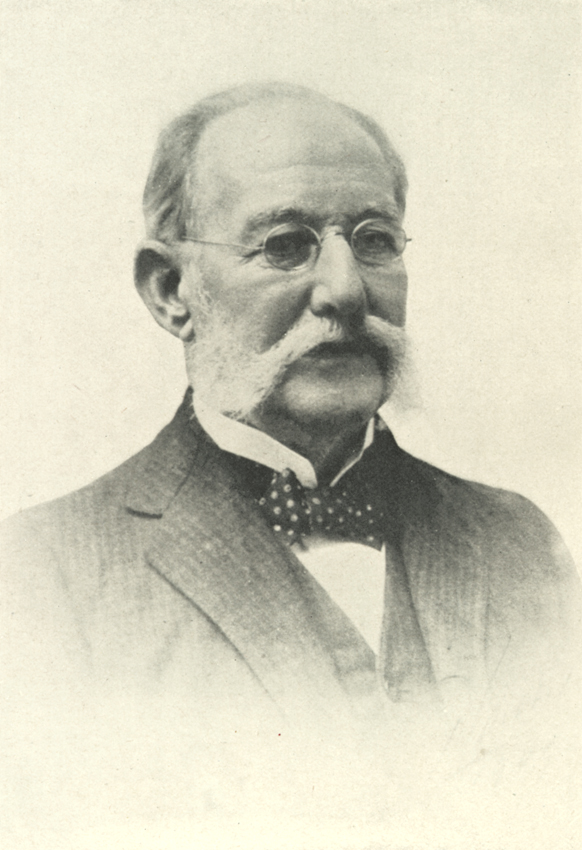
- Born: Juan Carlos Finlay y de Barrés; December 3, 1833; Puerto Príncipe, Cuba, Spanish Empire
- Died: August 20, 1915 (aged 81); Havana, Cuba
- Education: Jefferson Medical College
- Known for: Mosquito and yellow fever research

Carlos Juan Finlay (December 3, 1833 – August 20, 1915) was a Cuban epidemiologist recognized as a pioneer in the research of yellow fever, determining that it was transmitted through mosquitoes Aedes aegypti.

== Biography ==
=== Early life and education ===
Finlay was born Juan Carlos Finlay y de Barrés in Puerto Príncipe (now Camagüey), Cuba to a Scottish father Dr. Edward Finlay and French mother Elisa (Isabel) de Barrés.

At that time Cuba was part of the Kingdom of Spain. He reversed the order of his given names to "Carlos Juan" later in his life. His father was a physician who had fought alongside Simón Bolívar, and his family owned a coffee plantation in Alquízar. He attended school in France in 1844, but was forced to return to Cuba after two years because he contracted chorea.

After recovering, he returned to Europe in 1848, but became stuck in England for another two years due to political turmoil, and after arriving in France to continue his education, he contracted typhoid fever and again returned to Cuba.

Because the University of Havana would not recognize his European academic credits, he enrolled at Jefferson Medical College in Philadelphia, Pennsylvania, which did not require prerequisites. Here Finlay met John Kearsley Mitchell, a proponent of the germ theory of disease, and his son Silas Weir Mitchell, who supervised his studies. He graduated from Jefferson Medical College in 1855.

He then returned to Havana and set up an ophthalmology practice in 1857, and then studied in Paris in 1860–61.

=== Professional career ===
Finlay's work, carried out during the 1870s, finally came to prominence in 1900. He was the first to theorize, in 1881, that a mosquito was a carrier, now known as a disease vector, of the organism causing yellow fever: a mosquito that bites a victim of the disease could subsequently bite and thereby infect a healthy person. He presented this theory at the 1881 International Sanitary Conference, where it was not well-received, and in fact made him subject to ridicule and mockery. A year later Finlay identified a mosquito of the genus Aedes as the organism transmitting yellow fever. His theory was followed by the recommendation to control the mosquito population as a way to control the spread of the disease.

His hypothesis and exhaustive proofs were confirmed nearly twenty years later by the Walter Reed Commission of 1900. Finlay went on to become the chief health officer of Cuba from 1902 to 1909. Although Reed received much of the credit in history books for "beating" yellow fever, Reed himself credited Finlay with the discovery of the yellow fever vector, and thus how it might be controlled. Reed often cited Finlay's papers in his own articles and gave him credit for the discovery in his personal correspondence.

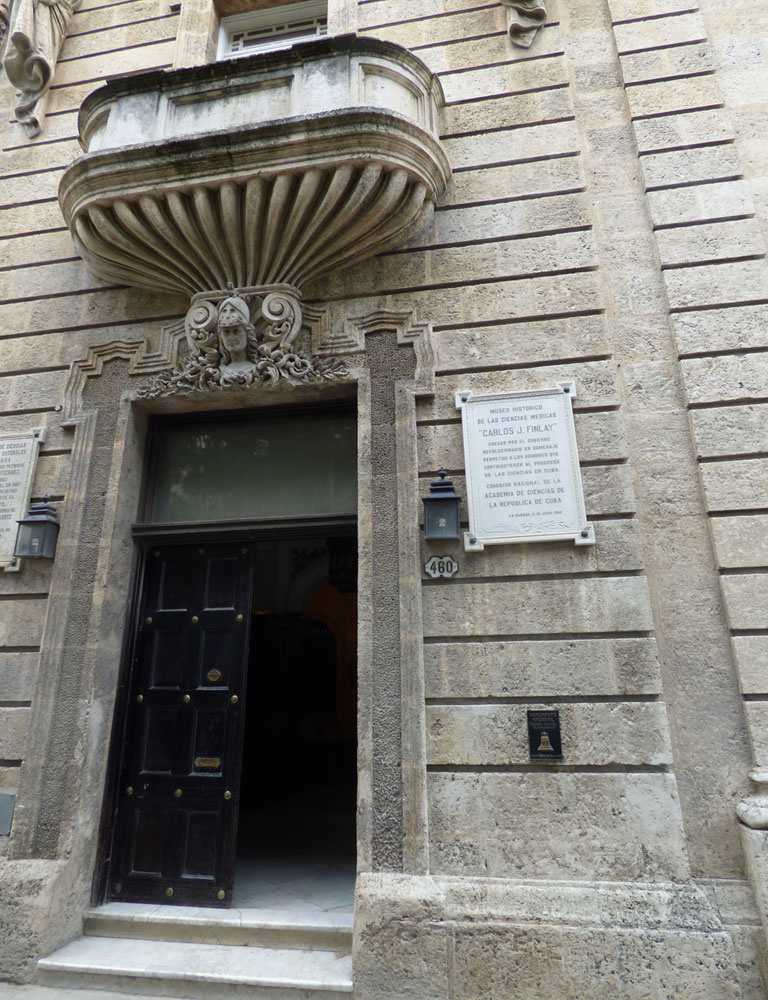
The Finlay Medical History Museum in Havana in 2016

In the words of General Leonard Wood, a physician and U.S. military governor of Cuba in 1900: "The confirmation of Dr. Finlay's doctrine is the greatest step forward made in medical science since Jenner's discovery of the vaccination [for smallpox]."

This discovery helped William C. Gorgas reduce the incidence and prevalence of mosquito-borne diseases in Panama during the American campaign, from 1903 onwards, to construct the Panama Canal. Prior to this, about 10% of the workforce had died each year from malaria and yellow fever.

Finlay was a member of Havana's Royal Academy of Medical, Physical and Natural Sciences. He was fluent in French, German, Spanish, and English and could read Latin. His interests were widespread and he wrote articles on subjects as varied as leprosy, cholera, gravity, and plant diseases. His main interest, however, was yellow fever, and he was the author of 40 articles on this disease. His theory that an intermediary host was responsible for the spread of the disease was treated with ridicule for years. A humane man, he often took on patients who could not afford medical care. As a result of his work, Finlay was nominated seven times for the Nobel Prize in Physiology or Medicine, although he was never awarded the prize. He received the National Order of the Legion of Honour of France in 1908.

== Personal life ==
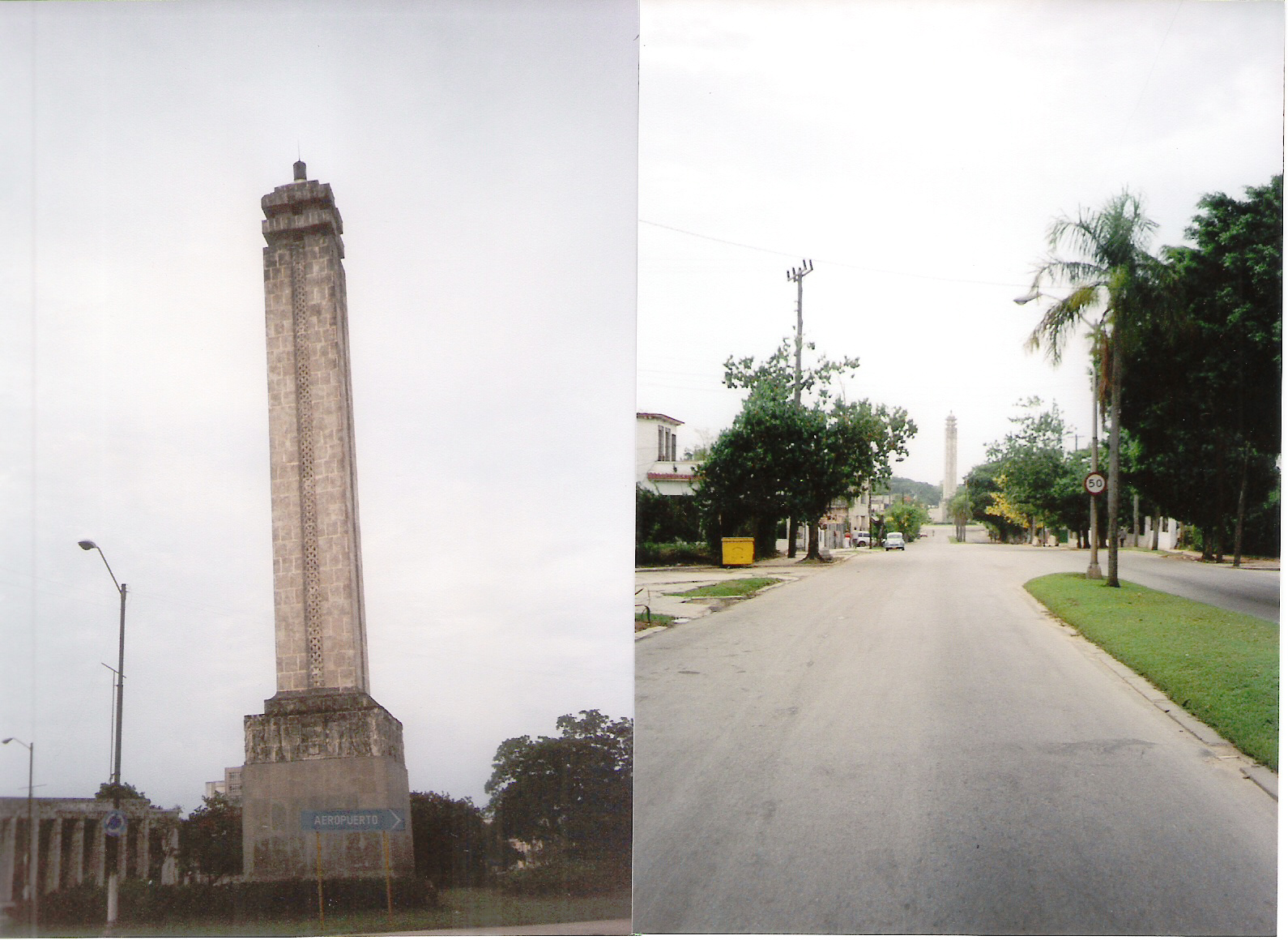
El Obelisco, Finlay's memorial in Havana

In October 1865 he married Adela Shine, a native of the Island of Trinidad. They had three sons, Charles, George and Frank Finlay.

Finlay died from a stroke, caused by severe brain seizures, at his house in Havana on August 20, 1915.

== Legacy ==
In 1928, President Gerardo Machado established the National Order of Merit Carlos J. Finlay, rewarding contributions to healthcare and medicine. It is the highest scientific decoration awarded by the Cuban Council of State. The order was discontinued between 1959 and 1981.

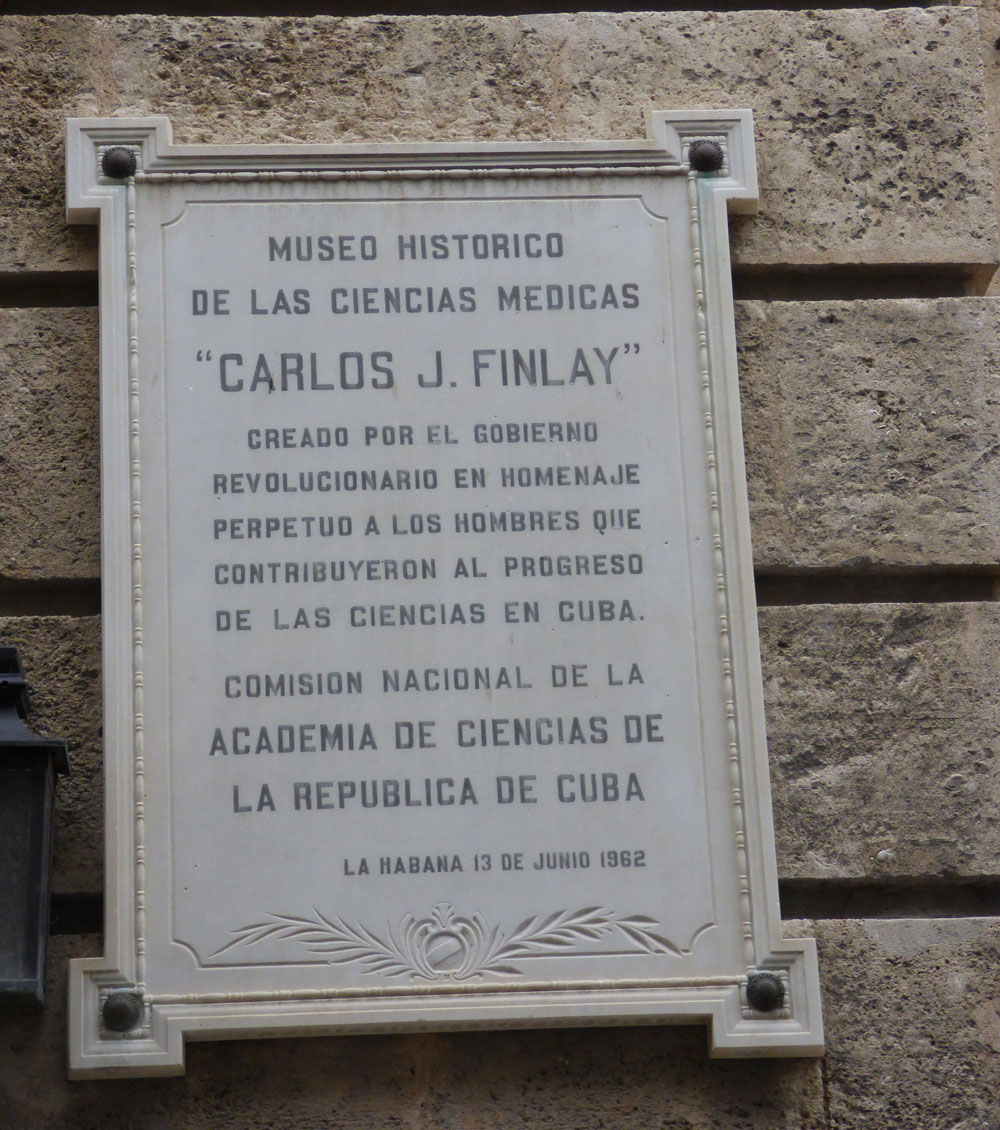
"History Museum of the Medical Sciences ' Carlos J. Finlay', created by the Revolutionary Government in eternal homage to the men who contributed to the advance of the sciences in Cuba. National Commission of the Academy of Sciences of the Republic of Cuba. Havana, 13 June 1962."

In recognition of his work on Yellow Fever, The American Society of Tropical Medicine & Hygiene posthumously awarded him the Walter Reed Medal in 1942.

On Cuba Street in downtown Old Havana, the Revolutionary Government in 1962 founded a medical history museum in honor of Carlos J. Finlay. On the wall of the Finlay Medical History Museum in Havana, the inscription states, "History Museum of the Medical Sciences ' Carlos J. Finlay', created by the Revolutionary Government in eternal homage to the men who contributed to the advance of the sciences in Cuba. National Commission of the Academy of Sciences of the Republic of Cuba. Havana, 13 June 1962."

In the municipality of Marianao, now within the city of Havana, there is a monument in the shape of a syringe, honoring Finlay and usually referred to as El Obelisco (The Obelisk). Finlay was also commemorated on a 1981 Cuban stamp. A statue commemorating Finlay is located on the bayfront in Panama City, near the canal he helped make possible.

The UNESCO Carlos J. Finlay Prize for Microbiology is named in his honor.

Finlay was honoured with a Google Doodle on December 3, 2013, on the 180th anniversary of his birth. Carlos J. Finlay Military Hospital is named after him. The Finlay Institute for Vaccines (Instituto Finlay de Vacunas, in Spanish), created in 1991, is named after him, as is the exoplanet BD−17 63 b in Cetus. Miami-Dade County Public Schools operates Dr. Carlos J. Finlay Elementary School on the campus of Florida International University, in Westchester, Florida (formerly in the University Park census-designated place).

== See also ==
- Healthcare in Cuba
- Health measures during the construction of the Panama Canal
