= John P. Woodall =

American entomologist

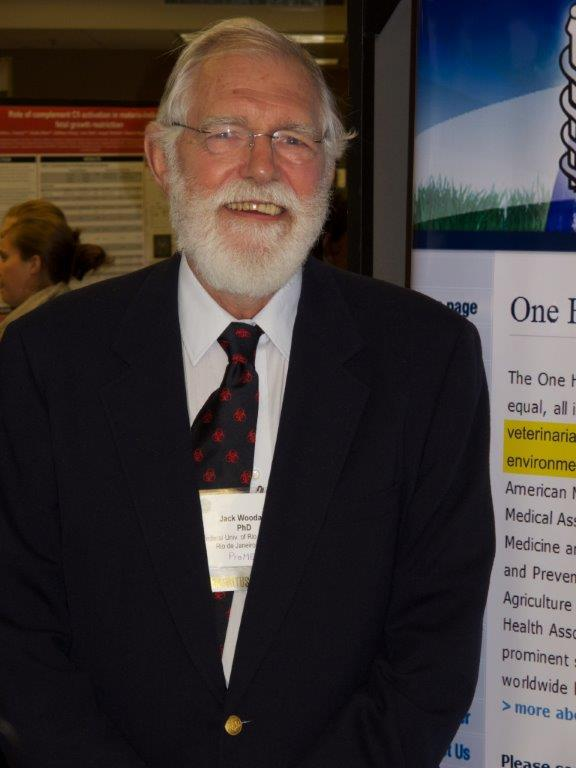
- Woodall at the first International Conference on Emerging Infectious Diseases in 1998
- Born: John Payne Woodall; 1935; Tianjin, China
- Died: 24 October 2016 (aged 80–81); London
- Education: London School of Hygiene & Tropical Medicine
- Scientific career
- Fields: Virology, Entomology

John Payne Woodall (1935–2016), known as Jack Woodall, was an American-British entomologist and virologist who made significant contributions to the study of arboviruses in South America, the Caribbean and Africa. He did research on the causative agents of dengue fever, Crimean–Congo hemorrhagic fever, o'nyong'nyong fever, yellow fever, Zika fever, and others.

He served as a staff member of the Rockefeller Foundation, and director of the Foundation's laboratory in Brazil, as a research fellow at the Yale Arbovirus Research Unit, was head of the Arbovirus Laboratory for the New York State Health Department, and worked for the Centers for Disease Control. Woodall spent 13 years at the World Health Organization developing and evaluating health programs.

After retirement in 2007, he continued as a consultant and professor at the Institute of Medical Biochemistry in Rio de Janeiro, Brazil, where he had worked since 1998. In 1994, he cofounded the Program for Monitoring Emerging Diseases (ProMED-mail). Woodall's emails concluded with a quote from the Calvin and Hobbes cartoon, "God put me on this earth to accomplish a certain number of things. Right now I'm so far behind I will never die."

== Early life and education ==
Woodall was born in Tianjin on the coast of China of British parents. He was in the third generation of a British family who first went to China as missionaries. His father was headmaster of the International/British School in Tianjin. When the Japanese occupied the International Settlement and the French Concession portions of Shanghai and the concessions in Tianjin after the attack on Pearl Harbor on 7 December 1941, he and his parents were interned in a prisoner of war camp similar to that portrayed in the novel Empire of the Sun, by J. G. Ballard, and film of the same name. He became interested in insects while wandering in weedy ground around the camp, where he and his family were interned until the end of the war in 1945.

Woodall attended Bedford School and Clare College, Cambridge. After graduating from the University of Cambridge, he obtained a PhD in virology and entomology at the London School of Hygiene and Tropical Medicine. He visited Brazil as a member of the Cambridge University Amazon Expedition of 1954.

== Research and career ==
=== Arbovirology ===
Woodall had over 30 years of experience isolating and characterizing viruses from humans, wildlife and arboviral vectors (mosquitoes, ticks) in Africa, the Caribbean and Latin America. His first post was as senior scientist for Her Majesty's Overseas Research Service, at the East African Virus Research Institute in Entebbe, Uganda. Woodall and two colleagues first isolated a virus they called the Congo virus, which was later identified as identical to a virus isolated by Soviet scientists in Crimea. The Soviets did not publish their findings until after the group in Africa. The disease was officially named the Crimean–Congo hemorrhagic fever virus at the insistence of the Soviets, despite violation of the principle of priority of publication, an event that Woodall noted was maybe the only instance of viral nomenclature overruled by politics and the Cold War.

At the Entebbe Lab, Woodall and a colleague made the first isolation of the o'nyong'nyong virus in 1959 during a large outbreak of a disease that appeared initially to be either dengue or chikungunya fever. They later found evidence that the presence of o'nyong'nyong fever seemed to affect the development of the malaria parasite, reducing malaria transmission rates. The o'nyong'nyong virus and the malarial parasite share a common vector, two species of anopheline mosquitoes. Woodall also conducted early research on the Zika virus in the early 1960s, about the time the virus was being confirmed as a cause of human disease.

Woodall worked next at the Rockefeller Foundation, receiving additional training in 1963 and then later becoming director of the Foundation's Belém Virus Laboratory, where he oversaw the documentation of the distribution of arboviruses of Brazil, discovered new viruses and conducted research on yellow fever. While at Rockefeller, Woodall became a United States citizen. Woodall then moved to the Foundation's Yale Arbovirus Research Unit, where he continued work with the data gathered in Brazil. After completing that research, he became head of the arbovirus laboratory of the New York State Department of Health Laboratories in Albany. In 1975 he went to work for the CDC, directing the San Juan Laboratory in Puerto Rico, a branch of the CDC's Division of Vector-Borne Infectious Diseases.

=== World Health Organization and Biodefense ===
Woodall worked at WHO in Geneva for 13 years. He traveled extensively as a team leader, assisting with the improvement of health laboratories, health services management, primary health care and health financing. He introduced WHO programs against AIDS in four African countries. At WHO he first became involved in the control of chemical and biological weapons, cofounding Task Force Scorpio, a United Nations rapid response team formed during the first Gulf War and then disbanded. Woodall called for re-funding of Task Force Scorpio and the Global Outbreak Alert and Response Network following the failures in the response to the Ebola epidemic in West Africa. In 2004, Woodall became a member of the Biological Weapons Working Group of the Center for Arms Control and Non-Proliferation. He was on the editorial advisory board of the Journal of Medical Chemical, Biological and Radiological Defense. In 1994, Woodall retired from WHO and returned to the New York State Department of Health.

=== Program for Monitoring Emerging Diseases ===
Woodall cofounded the Program for Monitoring Emerging Diseases (ProMED-mail) in 1994. He built ProMED-mail from its original 40 members to over 80,000 by 2016. One of his last series of posts was on the yellow fever outbreak in Angola. Eleven cases exported to China were the first occurrence of yellow fever in Asia in history. Woodall warned that spread of the disease to Asia would make "the Ebola and Zika epidemics look like picnics in the park!" Woodall and colleagues proposed the idea of using a fractional dose of the vaccine to extend existing supplies, which were insufficient to meet the needs of a vaccination campaign in Angola and DR Congo.

In 1998, he returned to Brazil as visiting professor and director of the Nucleus for the Investigation of Emerging Infectious Diseases at the Institute of Medical Biochemistry, Center for Health Sciences, Federal University of Rio de Janeiro, Brazil. He retired in 2007, but remained as a consultant and professor. In 2016, he was given the Richard M. Taylor Award by the American Society of Tropical Medicine and Hygiene.

Woodall was one of the leaders and autonomous pro bono team of the One Health Initiative, a collaborative effort toward optimizing the health of people and animals, and the environment.

=== Publications ===
Woodall published numerous articles in peer-reviewed scientific journals, wrote for the lay press, edited newsletters, and appeared on TV. He served on the editorial advisory board and was a columnist for The Scientist. He was co-editor of the Atlas of Human Infectious Diseases, published in 2012.

== See also ==
List of London School of Hygiene & Tropical Medicine people
