= 2016 Angola and DR Congo yellow fever outbreak =

Disease outbreak in Africa

2016 Angola and DR Congo yellow fever outbreak
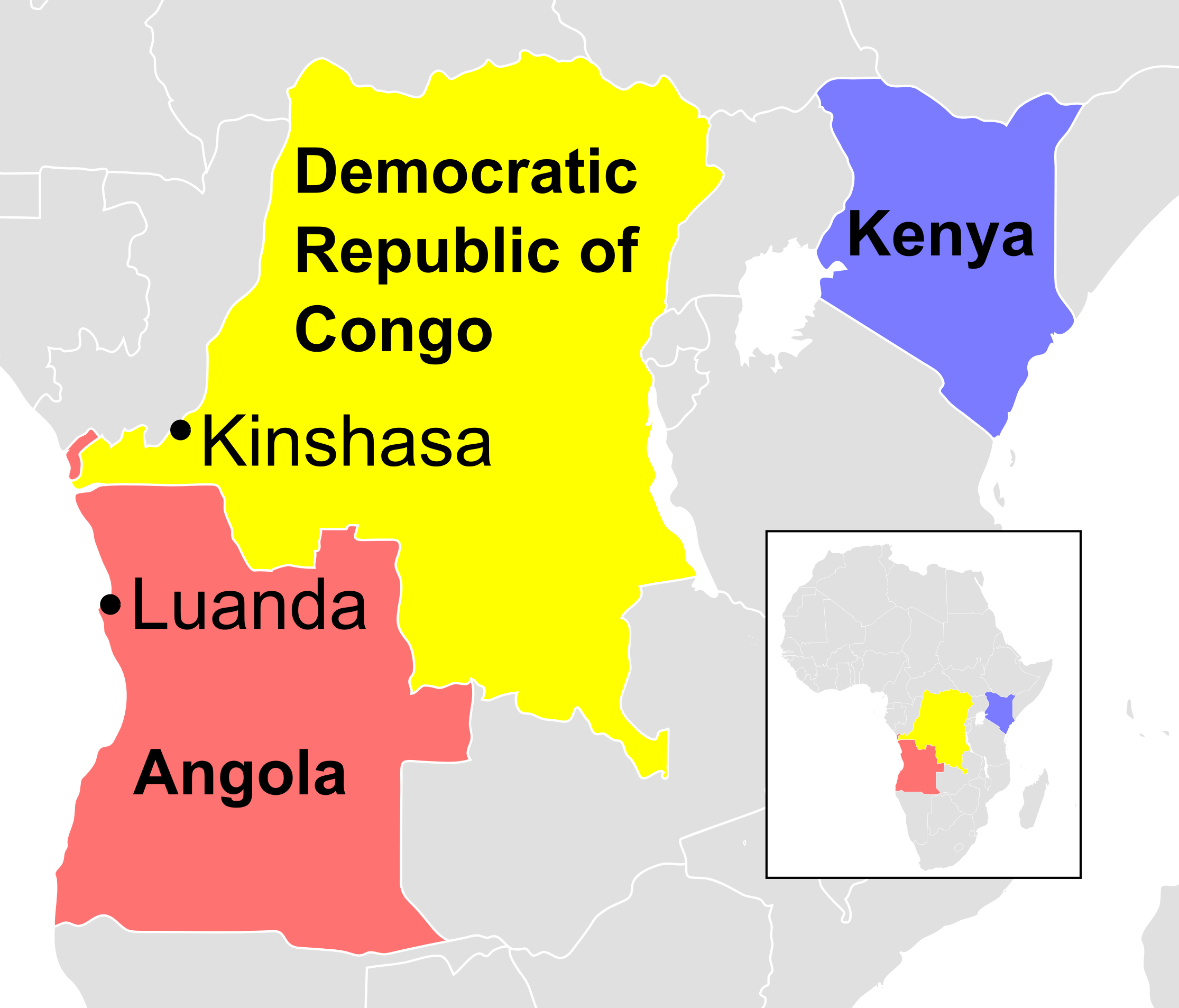
As of 28 October 2016
Angola
- 884 confirmed cases
- 121 deaths among confirmed cases (case fatality rate, 13.7%)
- 4347 suspected cases
- 377 deaths among suspected cases (case fatality rate, 8.7%)
DR Congo
- 78 confirmed cases (57 imported from Angola, 8 sylvatic, 13 autochthonous)
- 16 deaths among confirmed cases (case fatality rate, 21.1%)
- 2987 suspected cases
- 121 deaths among suspected cases (case fatality rate, 4.0%)

(Sylvatic cases are not considered part of the outbreak.)

Kenya
- 2 confirmed cases
China (not on map)
- 11 confirmed cases

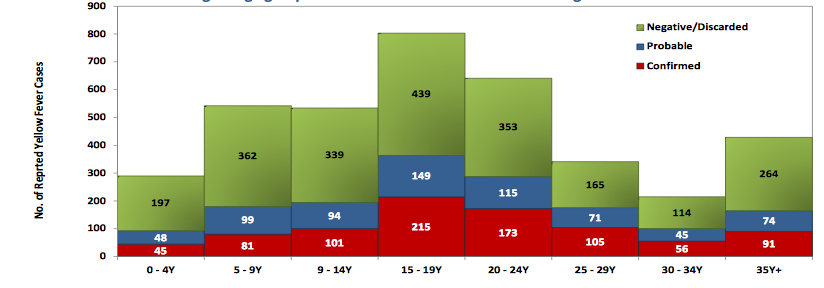
Yellow fever cases by age group in Angola, from 5 December 2015 to 4 August 2016.

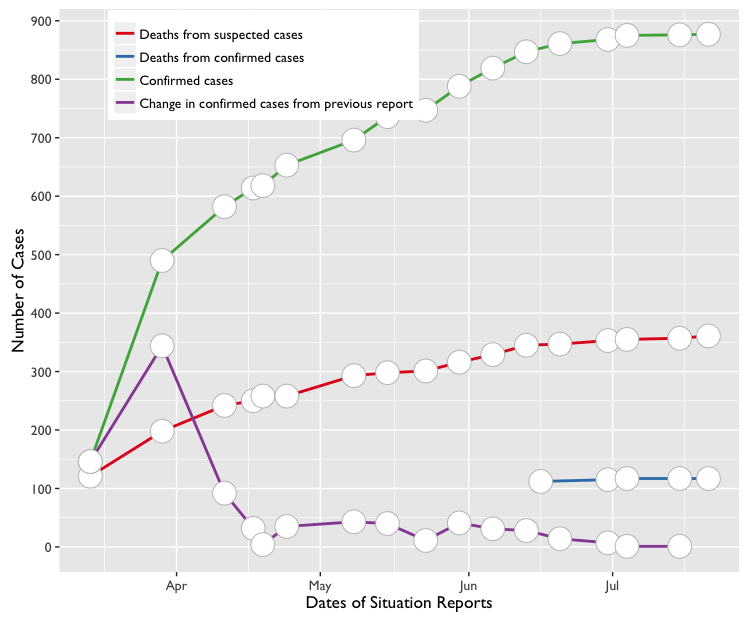
Confirmed cases and deaths (cumulative) in the 2016 epidemic of yellow fever in Angola as of 21 July 2016

On 20 January 2016, the health minister of Angola reported 23 cases of yellow fever with 7 deaths among Eritrean and Congolese citizens living in Angola in Viana municipality, a suburb of the capital of Luanda. The first cases (hemorrhagic fever suspected as being yellow fever) were reported in Eritrean visitors beginning on 5 December 2015 and confirmed by the Pasteur WHO reference laboratory in Dakar, Senegal in January. The outbreak was classified as an urban cycle of yellow fever transmission, which can spread rapidly. A preliminary finding that the strain of the yellow fever virus was closely related to a strain identified in a 1971 outbreak in Angola was confirmed in August 2016. Moderators from ProMED-mail stressed the importance of initiating a vaccination campaign immediately to prevent further spread. The CDC classified the outbreak as Watch Level 2 (Practice Enhanced Precautions) on 7 April 2016. The WHO declared it a grade 2 event on its emergency response framework having moderate public health consequences.

At an emergency committee meeting in Geneva, Switzerland on 19 May 2016, the WHO declared that the outbreak was serious and might continue to spread, but decided not to declare a public health emergency of international concern (PHEIC). On 30 May, Margaret Chan, director-general of WHO published a commentary on the bold action needed to prevent further spread of this important communicable disease that caused many historically significant epidemics that took many lives in previous centuries. On 8 June the International Federation of Red Cross and Red Crescent Societies called for a scale-up in the response because of the lack of vaccine and other limitations amid the continuing spread of the outbreak. On 12 August 2016, Daniel R. Lucey, a ProMED mail consultant, wrote an open letter to Dr. Chan requesting that the WHO emergency committee be reconvened to consider a PHEIC because of the continued spread of the disease in Democratic Republic of the Congo, the lack of sufficient vaccine, and concern that it may be spreading into the Republic of the Congo. On 31 August, the decision to not declare a PHEIC was re-confirmed. By 2 September 2016, WHO announced there had been no new cases in either Angola or DR Congo in over a month due to a massive vaccination campaign. On 25 November 2016, WHO announced that four months had passed without a new case. The last case in Angola was on 23 June and the last case in DR Congo was on 12 July. Dr Matshidiso Moeti, WHO Regional Director for Africa, stated: "The current battle against yellow fever in Angola and the Democratic Republic of the Congo is coming to a close, ... But the broader war against the disease is just getting started." ProMED-mail moderator Tom Yuill noted that maintaining vaccination coverage in the two countries will be the next challenge. Approximately 30 million people were vaccinated in the two countries.

== Spread within Angola ==
By early February, suspected cases were being reported from southern Huila province, about a 1000 kilometers south, and the provinces of Bié, Benguela, Cunene, Cabinda, Hula, Huambo, Malange, Kwanza Sul, Uige, Zaire and Kwanza Norte. As of 9 March 2016, the WHO reported that there were 65 confirmed cases, 813 suspected cases, and 138 deaths in Angola. On 22 March, WHO reported that cases had occurred in 6 of the 18 provinces of Angola, and that transmission was ongoing. Suspected and confirmed cases totaled 1,132, with 375 cases laboratory confirmed and 168 deaths. The situation report of 28 October 2016 reported the most recent number of suspected cases and laboratory-confirmed cases; total deaths and case fatality rates, with suspected and confirmed cases. Local, or autochthonous, transmission had been reported in 12 provinces as of 28 October. Confirmed cases had been reported in 16 of 18 provinces. No new cases were reported during July. The WHO congratulated the Angolan government on its effort to contain the outbreak.

== Spread to neighboring African countries ==
On 22 March 2016, the WHO was notified of 21 deaths from yellow fever in the Democratic Republic of the Congo, some in a province that borders Angola. As of 31 May, 700 suspected cases and 63 deaths had been reported to WHO through the national surveillance system. As of 31 May, 52 cases were laboratory confirmed by the National Institute for Biomedical Research in Kinshasa and the Pasteur Institute in Dakar. Forty-six of the 52 cases were imported from Angola; 2 were classified as autochthonous. Local transmission was still ongoing in urban areas in Angola and DR Congo. WHO classified the outbreak in DR Congo as a Grade 2 Emergency. On 30 May, the GAVI Alliance announced the launch of a mass vaccination campaign in DR Congo, but as of 22 June, vaccine was in short supply. On 20 June, the health minister declared the outbreak of yellow fever in three provinces, including the capital of DR Congo, Kinshasa. Transmission within Kinshasa is of concern because of the large and densely packed population. As of 8 July, WHO was notified of 1798 suspected cases, with 68 confirmed cases (59 imported from Angola) and 85 deaths. In the WHO situation report of 23 September, the last confirmed non-sylvatic or urban case had symptom onset on 12 July.

On 17 March, two cases, including one death, were reported in Kenya, imported from Angola. On 28 March, a rapid response team was deployed into Uganda, where there was ongoing transmission unrelated to the Angola outbreak. According to WHO, cases had been exported from Angola to China, DR Congo, and Kenya, as of 4 May 2016. One case had been reported in Namibia.

ProMED mail reported that as of 3 Aug 2016, 193 cases of yellow fever were suspected in the Republic of the Congo, with 4 cases having tested positive for yellow fever IgM.

== Spread to China via air travel ==
On 13 March 2016, the Chinese government confirmed that a 32-year-old male Chinese citizen who had been in Angola had developed yellow fever on return. The case was the first imported yellow fever case in China in history. Yellow fever has never appeared in Asia even though the mosquito vector is present. Additional cases were later reported in people who first had symptoms while in Luanda. ProMED-mail moderator Jack Woodall warned that "spread could make the Ebola and Zika epidemics look like picnics in the park!" and that "international action should start now." Chinese authorities strengthened thermal imaging at airports to detect passengers with elevated body temperatures. A Chinese medical team deployed to Angola vaccinated 120 Chinese nationals as part of epidemic research. More than 250,000 Chinese nationals live in Angola. On 8 April 2016, ten North Korean workers in Angola were reported to have died of yellow fever.

On 25 March 2016, a case was reported in Fujian Province, in a woman who returned from Angola on 12 March. Fujian is within the predicted distribution of Aedes aegypti, the mosquito that transmits the yellow fever virus to humans. Mosquito-borne diseases can become endemic in a new geographic area when local mosquitoes become infected by feeding on an imported case. Between 18 March and 22 April, the WHO was notified of 11 imported cases in China. Officials in Asia were concerned about the threat of yellow fever.

In June 2016, the genetic sequence of a virus from a yellow fever infected Chinese traveler to Angola was posted to GenBank by the Chinese CDC. The strain closely matched a 1971 strain, indicating that the yellow fever virus may have been circulating in the region for at least 45 years. The finding was consistent with earlier phylogenetic analyses performed during the outbreak.

== Potential for further international spread ==
On 28 March, ProMED-mail moderators Jack Woodall and Tom Yuill issued a strongly worded warning on the threat of yellow fever for countries that have endemic dengue fever (and thus the mosquito vector of yellow fever and dengue fever, Aedes aegypti), and particularly for countries in Asia, where until recently yellow fever has never appeared. Urban populations and mosquito-infested slums in Asia and Africa are much larger than in the past. A commentary and accompanying article published in May stressed the potential for spread to Asia by international air travel. Other parts of the world where yellow fever is present but usually in the quiescent jungle cycle, and where there is regular air travel, such as Brazil, may also be vulnerable. They stressed that world stocks of 7 million doses of vaccine have been exhausted in the vaccination campaign against the outbreak in Angola. If yellow fever spread to the 18 countries in Asia where the mosquito vector is present, more than 2 billion people would be at risk. They stated: "Apocalyptic forecasts of the numbers of fatalities from Ebola turned out to be wildly wrong, and we can hope that will again be the case here, but given the way Zika has exploded in the Western hemisphere, we can't count on it." CDC said they could not assist as much in the outbreak because all its experts were involved in efforts against the Zika virus outbreak in the Americas. Starting on 26 April, ProMED-mail issued a series of posts on pre-planning information for countries at risk of importation of yellow fever, covering vaccination, mosquito control, quarantine and personal protection measures.

In an article in JAMA on 9 May 2016, the Georgetown University Law Center called for the WHO to form an emergency committee to determine whether a public health emergency of international concern should be declared. On 12 May, the European Commissioner for Humanitarian Aid and Civil Protection of the European Union announced plans to send a team of the European Medical Corps to Angola on a two-week mission to help control the outbreak and assess the risk of further spread outside Angola. The medical corps was formed after the Ebola outbreak in West Africa that began in 2013, and the mission to Angola was its first deployment. The team included "emergency medical teams, public health and medical coordination experts, mobile biosafety laboratories, medical evacuation planes and logistical support teams".

Efforts to prevent international spread are confounded by the practice of selling falsified yellow fever vaccination certificates. The fake cards are sold to people who are required to have proof of vaccination after travel to areas where yellow fever is endemic. On 11 February 2016, the Pasteur Institute (WHO) in Senegal warned of fake yellow fever vaccine on the international market.

== Vaccination campaign ==
With help from the World Health Organization (WHO), the Angolan Ministry of Health began a campaign of preventive measures including vector control and vaccination in Viana in the first week of February. However, the minister reported that the government had enough vaccine for routine vaccination, but not enough to contain an outbreak. The WHO was supporting the Angolan government in immunization of 6.7 million people in Luanda province with the aim of vaccinating at least 80% of the population at risk of infection. The vaccine supply began to run low by late March, with the director of the CDC, Tom Friedman, warning that "It's possible we could run out of vaccine." The goal of the vaccination campaign in Luanda province was to vaccinate 88 percent of the population (5 804 475 of 6 583 216); ProMED reported that the total national stock of yellow fever vaccine as of 29 Mar 2016 was 1 032 970 doses. As of 10 April 2016, almost 6 million people had been vaccinated in Luanda. On 19 April, the WHO reported that the campaign had been extended into the provinces of Huambo and Benguela where local transmission was reported. On 23 May, the WHO reported that 7.8 million people (91.1%) had been vaccinated in the three provinces. On 23 May, the WHO announced that coverage of an additional 2.7 million people in 5 provinces had reached 55% after 6 days of vaccination.

If the epidemic were to spread, particularly into Asia, the global supply of vaccine would have been insufficient to protect the millions of people that would need to be vaccinated to curb an epidemic. As an emergency measure, experts suggested the dose-sparing strategy to extend existing supplies of vaccine, which the WHO could provide under the Emergency Use Assessment and Listing procedure. The WHO agreed to the recommendation in June 2016, authorizing one-fifth the usual dose during the ongoing outbreak in Angola and DR Congo, but international health regulations still apply to travelers, who must obtain the full dose to quality for the certificate of vaccination.

On June 22, the WHO announced plans to launch a pre-emptive emergency vaccination campaign beginning in July in highly trafficked borders areas of Angola and DR Congo and in densely populated Kinshasa. On 20 July, the DR Congo government launched a campaign to deliver 1 million doses of yellow fever vaccine over 10 days. In August, the WHO with partners including Médecins sans Frontières, International Federation of the Red Cross and UNICEF launched another campaign to vaccinate more than 14 million people in Angola and DR Congo. On 2 September, WHO announced that the campaign to vaccinate the 7.7 million residents of Kinshasa, the capital of DR Congo, had been completed in record time and before the beginning of the rainy season in September when the mosquito population expands. The campaign required 10 million specialized syringes and training of 40,000 vaccinators, using the dose sparing strategy of 1/5 the usual dose. Later studies found that the one-fifth-dose vaccine was just as protective as the full dose, even 10 years after the vaccination.

In August it was reported that of the 6 million vaccine doses shipped by WHO to Angola in February, one million doses went missing, resulting in shortages to fight the spreading epidemic in DR Congo. Vaccine and syringes might have been diverted for sale in private markets.

In the situation report of 23 September, the WHO announced a second phase of the vaccination campaign in Angola and a planned pre-emptive vaccination campaign for the Republic of Congo.

== Response to the epidemic ==
In June 2016, a WHO representative in Luanda said that the initial investigation of the outbreak was thrown off course because the first cases in December 2015—the sick Eritrean visitors—had what were later identified as fake yellow fever vaccination certificates. All had been to the same restaurant, so food poisoning was initially suspected as the cause of the mystery illness. It was more than a month before blood samples from the Eritreans reached the Pasteur Institute lab and yellow fever was recognized. Public health experts identified that as one factor that delayed the response to the outbreak, which came close to being a much larger disaster, if vaccine supplies had not been successfully raised in time, or the disease had spread to other countries and continents. The concurrent Zika outbreak drew attention away from a potentially far more serious epidemic of yellow fever.
