= Laura H. Kahn =

American medical researcher

- Education: B.S. degree in Nursing Science from UCLA, MD degree Mt Sinai School of Medicine, MPH Public Health Columbia University, Master's degree Public Policy Princeton University
- Occupations: General internist Medical Doctor, Research scholar, Expert advisor field of Zoonsis, lecturer, educator
- Website: http://www.princeton.edu/~lkahn/Site/Welcome.html

Laura H. Kahn is a native Californian. She is an author, lecturer, a general internist physician, and a research scholar with the Program on Science and Global Security at the Woodrow Wilson School of Public and International Affairs at Princeton University in New Jersey. She is the co-founder, of One Health Initiative. She is an online columnist for the Bulletin of the Atomic Scientists. She is an expert advisor and author in the field of zoonosis. Zoonosis is the study of infectious diseases where cross-species illnesses that are caused by bacteria, viruses, or parasites spread from non-human animals to humans. She is the author of Who's in Charge? Leadership During Epidemics, Bioterror Attacks, and Other Public Health Crises

== Education ==
- 1978 - 1981; B.S. degree in nursing from UCLA
- 1985 - 1989; MD degree Mt. Sinai School of Medicine
- 1992 - 1995; MPH Public Health master's degree in Public Health from Columbia University
- 2001 - 2002; Master's degree in Public Policy from Princeton University

== Career ==
1997 - 2001; Managing Physician New Jersey Department of Health and Senior Services

2000 - 2016; Vice President with the Princeton Board of Health

2002 - current a research scholar with Princeton University Program on Science and Global Security, WWS

2006 - Kahn published Confronting Zoonoses, Linking Human and Veterinary Medicine in the Center for Disease Control and Prevention's (CDC) Journal of Emerging Infectious Disease. The publication was helpful in launching the One Health Initiative.

Kahn was the co-director and a lecturer for the course, "Zoonoses: An Emerging Public Health Issue". The course was for graduate and medical students at Mount Sinai School of Medicine in New York City. In 2010 - 2011 she taught a freshman seminar at Princeton titled "When Cows Go Crazy: The Inextricable Link Between Human and Animal Health."

2014 - Kahn co-authored "Confronting Emerging Zoonoses: The One Health Paradigm" with Akio Yamada, Bruce Kaplan, Thomas P. Monath, John P. Woodall, and Lisa Conti. The book is said to be the latest information with resources in understanding the origin of human pathogens and disease emergence from a One Health paradigm. Which is the interface between human and veterinary medicine, and public health. 2019 - Expert Advisor on antimicrobial resistance ICF

2010 & 2011 Kahn taught a course titled "When Cows Go Crazy: The Inextricable Link Between Human and Animal Health".

Laura Kahn teaches an online course with Coursera. The title of the course is 'Bats, Ducks, and Pandemics: An Introduction to One Health Policy'

=== Author ===
- 2020 - Who's in Charge?: Leadership during Epidemics, Bioterror Attacks, and Other Public Health Crises, 2nd Edition (Praeger Security International) 2nd Edition
- 2016 - One Health and the Politics of Antimicrobial Resistance, was published by Johns Hopkins University Press; This book researches Zoonoses infectious diseases. Zoonoses Diseases such as COVID19 (coronavirus), SARS, and mad cow diseases that originate from animals that spread to human.
- 2014 - Co-authored "Confronting Emerging Zoonoses: The One Health Paradigm"* 2009 -Laura Kahn, Who's In Charge?: Leadership during Epidemics, Bioterror Attacks, and Other Public Health Crises 1st edition

Kahn argues that an imminent threat to the public health, such as the global H1N1/swine flu outbreak, is no time for a muddled chain of command and contradictory decision-making. "Who's In Charge?" explores the crucial relationships between political leaders, public health officials, journalists, and others to see why leadership problems occur during public health emergencies.

=== Interests ===
- Global Sustainability
- Food safety
- Food security
- Antimicrobial resistance
- Emerging infectious disease
- Climate change
- Vector (epidemiology)
- Human animal and environmental health (i.e. One Health)
- Leadership during epidemics and public health crises

=== Volunteer ===
2000 to 2016; volunteer serving with the Princeton Board of Health. The Board meets to review; (updated data, and public health issues). It makes recommendations and policies. They assist health officers in an event of a serious outbreak with influenza, etc. with response plans and policies.

== Awards ==
Her course "Hogs, Bats, and Ebola: An Introduction to One Health policy," was awarded by Princeton University for Innovation in Undergraduate Education In 2010, Kahn was given the American Veterinary Epidemiology Society (AVES) award and given an honorary diploma for One Health In 2014, Presidential Award for Meritorious Service from the American Association of Public Health Physicians In 2016, the American Veterinary Epidemiology Society (AVES) the K.F. Meyer-James H. Steele Gold Head Cane Award.

== See also ==
- One Health Model
