= Task Force Scorpio =

Task Force Scorpio was a United Nations biological and chemical weapons response team that was activated during the first Gulf War to respond to any reported use of weapons of mass destruction on civilians. The task force was composed of volunteer Swiss members of the Disaster Relief Unit and international specialists, equipped with the latest chemical and biological protection equipment, immunized against agents suspected for battlefield use and had its own jet transportation. The members of the team were to travel under Swiss diplomatic passports anywhere in the world in less than 24 hours of need.

The task of the force was to arrive on reportedly contaminated land, assess the risk to the civilian population, respond to it and coordinate the response by other international relief agencies, telling them when it would be safe to send in their personnel. Task Force Scorpio was under the orders of the Secretary-General of the United Nations, and was ready for active duty on the 28 February 1991, in time for the first Gulf War. It was not deployed. The Task force was founded by Dr Robert Steffen of the Institute of Social and Preventive Medicine, University of Zurich, Switzerland and co-founded by Jack Woodall, PhD, then at WHO/Geneva and leader of the WHO delegation to the Biological Weapons Convention.

== Re-activation ==
The Task force was deactivated after the first Gulf War. But the World Health Organization approached the Swiss government to reactivate it in January 2003. It was to be renamed the Swiss/European WMD Task Force. No information has been published about its reactivation.

In February 2016, the European Union launched a similar medical corps to respond to emergencies like the Ebola outbreak in West Africa. The response to that outbreak was slower and less organized than it might have been had a quick response force been available.

== Sources ==
- Barbara Hatch Rosenberg (January–February 2004). "Enforcing WMD Treaties: Consolidating a UN Role". Disarmament Diplomacy (75). Acronym Institute. Note 31.
- Dr Jack Woodall. "Task Force Scorpio: Civilian Relief after Biological Attack". Federation of American scientists.
- Woodall, John P (November 30, 2004). "Civilian Relief after Release of Weapons of Mass Destruction: Need for a New Task Force 'Scorpio'". In Kocik, Janusz (ed.). Preparedness Against Bioterrorism And Re-Emerging Infectious Diseases (Nato Science Series I:Life and Behavioural Sciences). IOS Press. pp. 111–113. ISBN 978-1586034177.
- Woodall, Jack (February 28, 2003). "Civilian Relief after Release of Weapons of Mass Destruction". Applied Science and Analysis Newsletter. 03–1 (94).
- "Introduction: see Section 1.2 Paragraph 3". Public health response to biological and chemical weapons. Global Alert and Response, World Health Organization. 2004. Archived from the original (PDF) on August 5, 2003.
