= List of people who caught yellow fever =

This articles documents notable people who were afflicted with yellow fever, whether or not they died from the disease. In 2013, approximately 127,000 individuals were diagnosed with severe cases of yellow fever.

== List ==
- François Carlo Antommarchi, Napoleon's physician, died in Cuba in 1838.
- John James Audubon, famous ornithologist, caught yellow fever on arrival in New York City when he emigrated to the United States in 1803. He died of Alzheimer's disease in 1851.
- Benjamin Franklin Bache (journalist), died at age 29 in the yellow fever epidemic of 1798 in Philadelphia, Pennsylvania, New Haven, Connecticut and New York City.
- Richard Bayley, physician, died in 1801 of yellow fever caught while inspecting a ship that had arrived in New York City from Ireland.
- Honório Hermeto Carneiro Leão, Marquis of Paraná, Brazilean politician, diplomat and magistrate, died in 1856 in Rio de Janeiro, possibly of yellow fever, although the cause was never established.
- James Carroll (scientist), infected himself during studies of yellow fever in Cuba with Walter Reed. Recovered initially, but eventually died in 1907.
- Jean-Marie Collot d'Herbois, a French actor, dramatist, essayist, and revolutionary died of yellow fever at Cayenne, French Guiana, in 1796.
- Pierre Le Moyne d'Iberville, a French soldier, ship captain, explorer, and founder of the French colony of Louisiana of New France, died in 1706, perhaps of yellow fever.
- Theodore Judah, American railroad and civil engineer, died of yellow fever in 1863.
- Thomas Dundas (British Army officer), Governor of Guadeloupe, died of yellow fever in 1794.
- John Fenno, Federalist Party editor and major figure in the history of American newspapers, died of yellow fever in Philadelphia during the epidemic of 1798.
- Robert Gray (sea captain), pioneered the American maritime fur trade on the northern Pacific coast of North America and completed the first American circumnavigation of the world in 1790. Died at sea in 1806, possibly of yellow fever, after trips to South America, including Rio de Janeiro.
- Louis Moreau Gottschalk, American composer and pianist, died in 1869 in Rio de Janeiro.
- Charles Griffin, Union general in the American Civil War, died in 1867 at the age of 41 in Galveston, Texas, during an epidemic of yellow fever.
- Charles Frederick Hartt, Canadian-American geologist, paleontologist and naturalist who specialized in the geology of Brazil, died of yellow fever in 1878 at the age of 38 in Rio de Janeiro.
- Jack London, may have contracted yellow fever and other tropical diseases during cruises in the Pacific, but died in California in 1916 at age 40, suffering from dysentery, late-stage alcoholism, and uremia while also in extreme pain and taking morphine.
