= Chinese people in Angola =

Total population
- 50,000 (2017)

Regions with significant populations
- Luanda

Related ethnic groups
- Overseas Chinese, Macanese people

Chinese people in Angola are a recent group of residents, having arrived in Angola in the past few decades.

Thousands of Chinese construction workers, engineers, planners, and support staff that includes doctors and cooks reside in Angola, making the construction sector a large magnet for Chinese.

Over 500 Chinese companies have operated in Angola, as part of post-war reconstruction. The height of the wave was around 2012 when Angola's Office of Migration and Foreigners, stated 258,920 Chinese resided in Angola, the vast majority (258,391) on work visas. According to a retrospective estimate from the South China Morning Post, the Chinese population in Angola peaked at 300,000.

The level of the Chinese population since the crash in oil prices in 2014 has fallen dramatically. In 2017, a Chinese business association leader told Bloomberg that the population was approximately 50,000. Many Chinese have left the country recently because of rising crime against Chinese, including rapes, robberies and murder, the depreciation of Angolan currency due to the oil crash, and halting of construction contracts by Chinese companies.

During a large outbreak of yellow fever in Angola in the spring of 2016, eleven Chinese nationals were reported to have traveled home to China with the disease, with the last case in April 2016. The Chinese strengthened surveillance and sent a medical team to Angola to provide vaccination to Chinese nationals.

By 2022, the population was estimated to be down to 20,000, following a multi-year contraction of Angola's economy as well as changes to Angola–China relations during the presidency of João Lourenço.

Following the July 2025 Angolan protests, dozens of Chinese-owned retail shops were looted and thousands of Chinese nationals fled the country.

== Everyday relations ==
Everyday relations of Chinese and Angolan residents in Luanda:

According to Schmitz, "In Luanda, a state-level partnership between China and Angola is widely acknowledged, while most relationships between Chinese and Angolan individuals remain tenuous."

There is a context of mutual uncertainty and suspicion, but Chinese and Angolan residents are not two separate groups with opposed interests and lack of communication: They share daily life. So references to the concept of "security" are common. For example, "Wen relied on her Angolan employees, as Pedro relied on his Chinese workers. For Wen, however, Angolans could be considered both a threat to security and the guarantee of it; for Pedro, Chinese labour was both the source of unreliable products and the assurance of timely production."

While searching for ways to explain the tensions, residents and state representatives use the common language of security.

Pedro and Wen, for example, talked about insecurity as due to Chinese being pirates and Angolans being thieves, despite both relying, for their livelihoods, on members of these groups.

For the Chinese and Angolan states, on the other hand, explanations for insecurity were because perception of a state being linked to criminality or corruption would threaten the image and success of their mutual partnership.

== See also ==
- Angola–China relations
