= Fractional dose vaccination =

Fractional dose vaccination is a strategy to reduce the dose of a vaccine to achieve a vaccination policy goal that is more difficult to achieve with conventional vaccination approaches, including deploying a vaccine faster in a pandemic, reaching more individuals in the setting of limited healthcare budgets, or minimizing side effects due to the vaccine.

Fractional dose vaccination exploits the nonlinear dose-response characteristics of a vaccine: If two persons can be vaccinated instead of one, but each one gets 2/3 of the protective efficacy, there is a net benefit at society scale for reducing the number of infections. If the healthcare budget is limited or only a limited amount of vaccine is available during the early phase of a pandemic, this can make a difference for the total number of infections.

Fractional dose vaccination uses a fraction of the standard dose of a regular vaccine that is administered by the same, or an alternative route (often subcutaneously or intradermally).

Fractional dose vaccination has been used or proposed in a number of relevant infectious poverty diseases including yellow fever, poliomyelitis, COVID-19.

== Use ==
=== In the context of limited healthcare budgets ===
During the 2016 yellow fever outbreak in Angola and the Democratic Republic of the Congo, the WHO approved the use of fractional dose vaccination to deal with a potential shortage of vaccine. In August 2016, a large vaccination campaign in Kinshasa used 1/5 of the standard vaccine dose. In 2018 it was reported that fractional dose vaccination with 1/5 of the standard vaccine dose, administered intradermally, conferred protection for 10 years, as documented by a randomized clinical trial.

In Poliomyelitis, fractional dose vaccination has been shown to be effective while reducing overall cost, rendering polio vaccination available to more individuals.

=== In the Covid-19 pandemic ===
In a pandemic wave, fractional dose vaccination is considered to accelerate widespread access to vaccination when vaccine supply is limited:

In the COVID-19 pandemic, epidemiologic models predict a major benefit of personalized fractional dose vaccination strategies with certain vaccines in terms of case load, deaths, and shortening of the pandemic.

=== To reduce side effects ===
In some segments of the population, disease risk is lower but specific vaccine side effect risks may be increased. In such subpopulations, fractional dose vaccination might optimize the benefit-risk ratio of vaccination for an individuum and optimize the cost-benefit relation for society.
