= History of yellow fever =

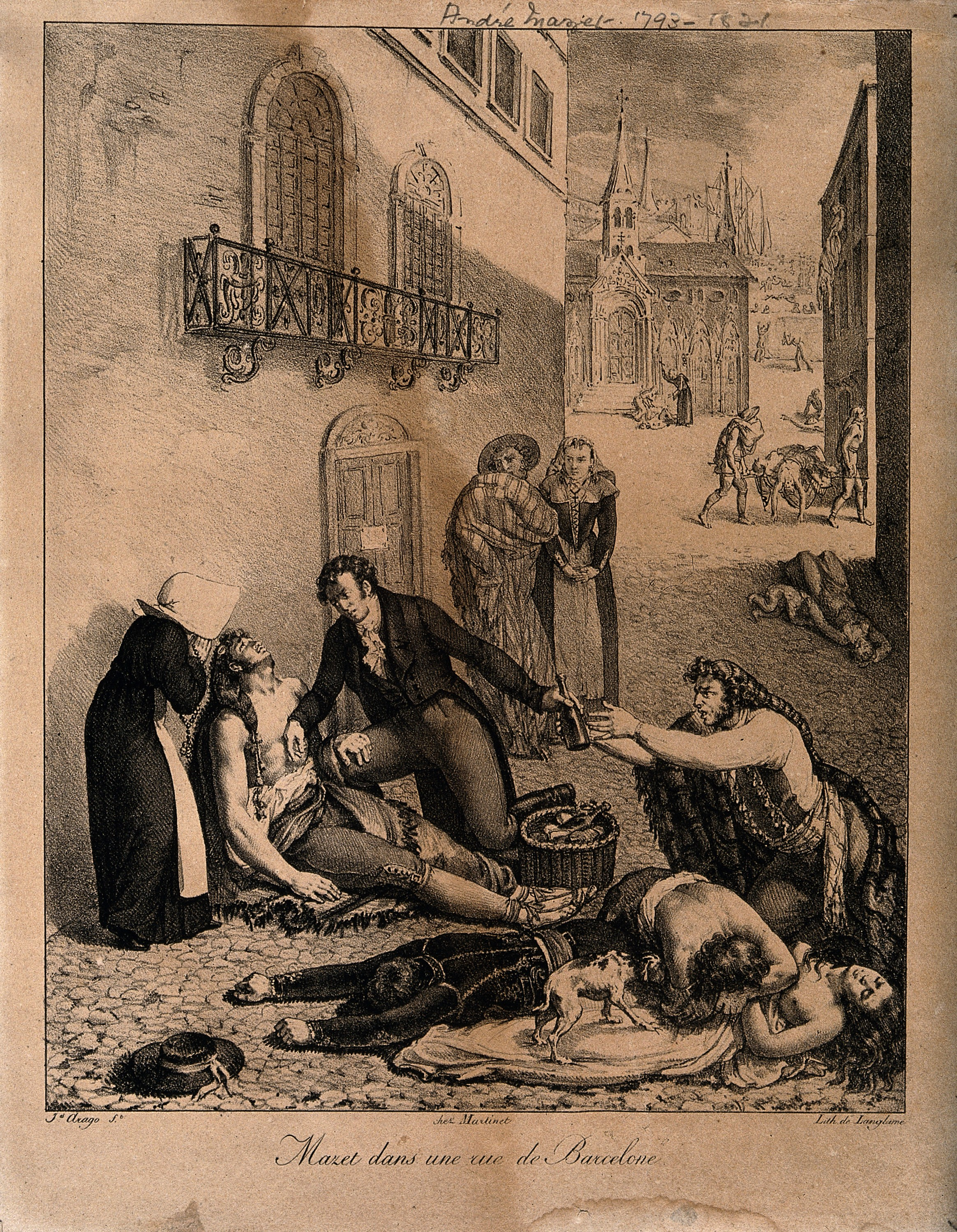
The outbreak of yellow fever in Barcelona in 1821

The evolutionary origins of yellow fever are most likely African. Phylogenetic analyses indicate that the virus originated from East or Central Africa, with transmission between primates and humans, and spread from there to West Africa. The virus as well as the vector Aedes aegypti, a mosquito species, were probably brought to the western hemisphere and the Americas by slave trade ships from Africa after the first European exploration in 1492. However, some researchers have argued that yellow fever might have existed in the Americas during the pre-Columbian period as mosquitoes of the genus Haemagogus, which is indigenous to the Americas, have been known to carry the disease.

The first outbreaks of disease that were probably yellow fever occurred in the Windward Islands of the Caribbean, on Barbados in 1647 and Guadeloupe in 1648. Barbados had undergone an ecological transformation with the introduction of sugar cultivation by the Dutch. Plentiful forests present in the 1640s were completely gone by the 1660s. By the early 18th century, the same transformation related to sugar cultivation had occurred on the larger islands of Jamaica, Hispaniola, and Cuba. Spanish colonists recorded an outbreak in 1648 on the Yucatán Peninsula of Mexico that may have been yellow fever. The illness was called xekik (black vomit) by the Maya.

At least 25 major outbreaks followed in North America, such as in 1793 in Philadelphia, where several thousand people died, more than nine percent of the total population. The American government, including President George Washington, had to flee the city, which was the capital of the United States at the time. In 1878, about 20,000 people died in an epidemic which struck the towns of the Mississippi River Valley and its tributaries. The last major outbreak in the US occurred in 1905 in New Orleans. Major outbreaks also occurred in Europe in the 19th century in Atlantic ports following the arrival of sailing vessels from the Caribbean, most often from Havana. Outbreaks occurred in Barcelona, Spain, in 1803, 1821, and 1870. In the 1870 outbreak, 1,235 fatalities were recorded of an estimated 12,000 cases. Smaller outbreaks occurred in Saint-Nazaire in France, Swansea in Wales, and in other European port cities, following the arrival of vessels carrying the mosquito vector.

The first mention of the disease by the name "yellow fever" occurred in 1744. Many famous people, mostly during the 18th through the 20th centuries, contracted and then recovered from, or died of, yellow fever.

== Philadelphia: 1793–1805 ==
The yellow fever epidemic of 1793 struck during the summer in Philadelphia, Pennsylvania, where the highest fatalities in the United States were recorded. The disease probably was brought by refugees and mosquitoes on ships from Saint-Domingue. It rapidly spread in the port city, in the crowded blocks along the Delaware River. About 5,000 people died, ten percent of the population of 50,000. The city was then the national capital, and the national government left the city, including President George Washington. Philadelphia, Baltimore, and New York suffered repeated epidemics in the 18th and 19th centuries, as did other cities along the East and Gulf Coasts.

At the time, the known solution to recovery was found to be long and tedious as it was expected that patients needed to consume bitters and country air away from the metropolitan area in order to recover. Yet the average citizen typically sought medical help from the Pennsylvania Hospital. Year after year starting in 1793, yellow fever returned to major cities along the east coast including Philadelphia leaving investigators stagnant in regard to progress made in the search for the cause of yellow fever. Yellow fever's prevalence during this era killed over 10,000 people starting in 1793 where nearly 5,000 people died, striking again in 1797 tallying about 1,500 people, and again the next year in 1798 killing 3,645 people.

=== Potential causes ===
With the spread of yellow fever in 1793, physicians of the time used the increased number of patients to increase the knowledge in disease as the spread of yellow fever, helping differentiate between other prevalent diseases during the period as cholera and typhus were current epidemics of the time as well. As doctors and people of interest investigated the cause of yellow fever, two main hypotheses derived from the confusing data they collected. The first was that the disease is contagious, as the disease is spread through the contact of people, as ships from the already infected Caribbean Islands had spread to major cities. The second hypothesis was that the disease derived from local sources; doctors proposed that contact with these sources caused the sickness rather than contact with people with the disease, as yellow fever seemed to be prevalent in major cities and less effective in rural areas.

== Haiti: 1790–1802 ==
The majority of the British soldiers sent to Haiti in the 1790s died of disease, chiefly yellow fever. There has been considerable debate over whether the number of deaths caused by disease was exaggerated.

In 1802–1803, an army of forty thousand sent by First Consul Napoleon Bonaparte of France to Saint-Domingue to suppress the Haitian Revolution mounted by slaves, was decimated by an epidemic of yellow fever (among the casualties was the expedition's commander and Bonaparte's brother-in-law, Charles Leclerc). Some historians believe Napoleon intended to use the island as a staging point for an invasion of the United States through Louisiana (then newly regained by the French from the Spanish.). Others believe that he was most intent on regaining control of the lucrative sugar production and trade in Saint-Domingue. Only one-third of the French troops survived to return to France, and in 1804 the new republic of Haiti declared its independence.

== Charleston, South Carolina: 1699–1761 ==
The first notable evidence of yellow fever epidemics in Charleston, South Carolina was documented in 1700 by the governor and council. 37 French people, 16 Native Americans, and one African American were recorded as fatalities from an epidemic that hit Charleston in 1699. From the yellow fever epidemic in 1700, an estimated 180 people died, causing approximately 6% of the colony to die within two months. In 1728, another fever epidemic hit Charleston during a warm summer, as recorded by historian Alexander Hewat. During an epidemic in 1732, physician John Lining openly proclaimed that it was yellow fever. Lining later wrote one of the first clinical descriptions of yellow fever at the time, succeeding John Moultrie, Jr. Subsequent epidemics followed, including in 1739, 1745, 1748, 1753, 1755, and 1761.

== Savannah, Georgia: 1820 ==
Nearly 700 people in Savannah, Georgia, died from yellow fever in 1820, including two local physicians who lost their lives caring for the stricken. An outbreak on an immigrant ship with Irish natives in 1819 led to a passage of an act to prevent the arrival of immigrant ships, which did not prevent the epidemic where 23% of the deaths were of Irish descent. Several other epidemics followed, including 1854 and 1876.

== New Orleans, Louisiana: 1853 ==
The 1853 outbreak claimed 7,849 residents of New Orleans. The press and the medical profession did not alert citizens of the outbreak until the middle of July, after more than one thousand people had already died. The New Orleans business community feared that word of an epidemic would cause a quarantine to be placed on the city, and their trade would suffer. In such epidemics, steamboats frequently carried passengers and the disease upriver from New Orleans to other cities along the Mississippi River.

During this time as well native-born Creoles were more likely to survive the yellow fever than many white migrants. Several statisticians have determined that white American migrants died more than four times the rate of Creoles. British and French migrants died ten times the rate of Creoles. Irish and German migrants were twenty times more likely to die than Creoles.

The epidemic was dramatized and featured in the plot of the 1938 film Jezebel, starring Bette Davis.

Yellow fever was a threat in New Orleans and south Louisiana virtually every year, during the warmest months. Among the more prominent victims were: Spanish colonial Governor Manuel Gayoso de Lemos (1799); the first and second wives (d. 1804 and 1809) and young daughter (1804) of territorial Governor William C. C. Claiborne; one of New Orleans' most important early city planners Barthelemy Lafon (1820), architect Benjamin Henry Latrobe and one of his sons (1820, 1817, respectively), who were in New Orleans building the city's first waterworks; Jesse Burton Harrison (1841), a young lawyer and author; Confederate Brig. Gen. Young Marshall Moody (1866); architect James Gallier, Jr. (1868); and Confederate Lt. Gen. John Bell Hood and his wife and daughter (1879).

== Norfolk, Virginia: 1855 ==
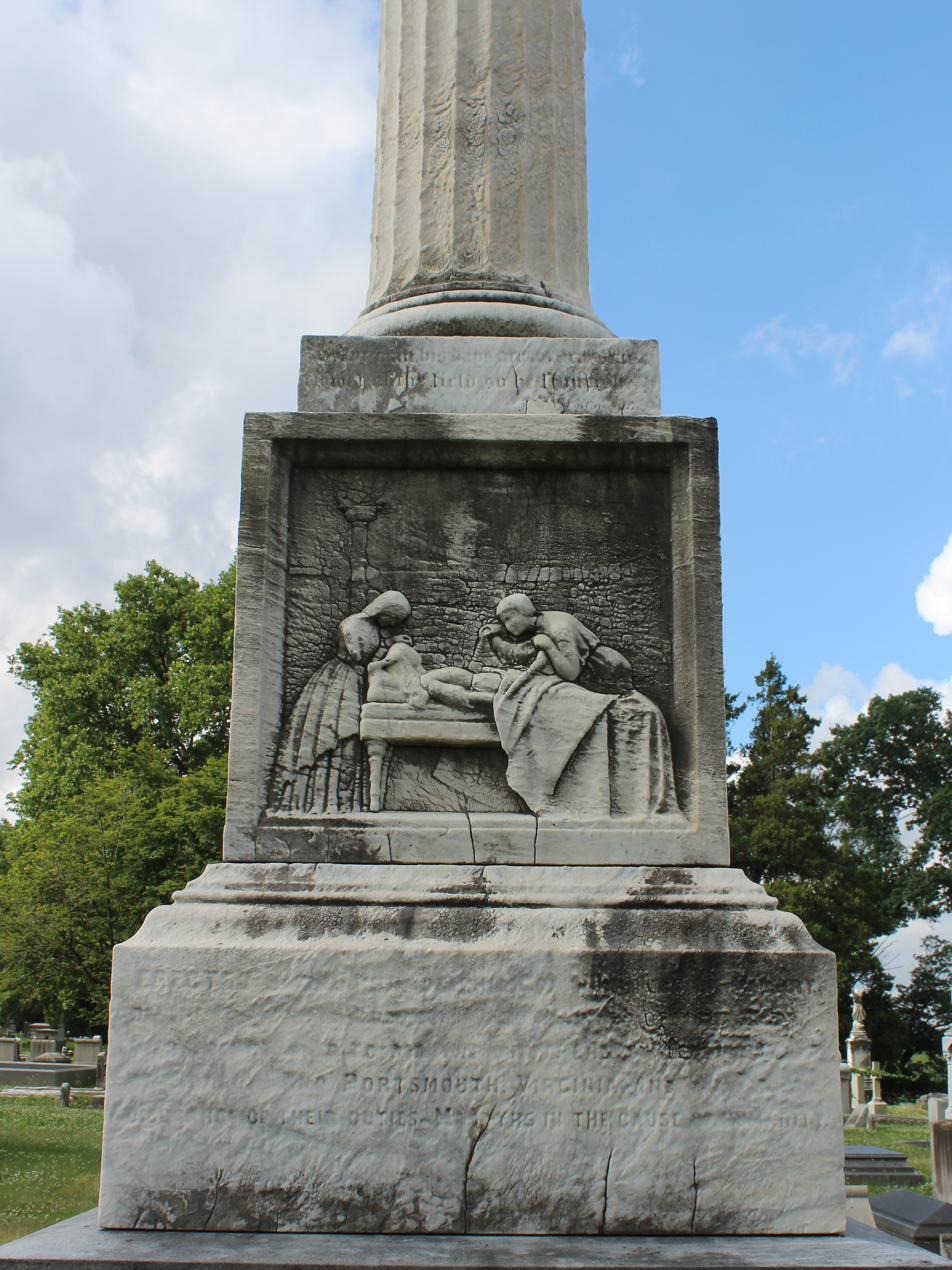
The Yellow Fever Memorial was built in 1856 in Laurel Hill Cemetery to honor the Philadelphia "Doctors, Druggists and Nurses" who helped fight the epidemic in Portsmouth, Virginia.

The steamship, Benjamin Franklin sailing from Saint Thomas in the West Indies and carrying persons infected with the virus arrived in Hampton Roads in southeastern Virginia on 6 June 1855. During the outbreak, the Norfolk Naval Hospital patient register, recorded a total of 587 fever cases (see thumbnail) admitted between the date of 25 July and 10 November 1855. The hospital staff calculated the total fever deaths as 208. The disease spread quickly through the community, eventually killing over 3,000 people, mostly residents of Norfolk and Portsmouth. The Howard Association, a benevolent organization, was formed to help coordinate assistance in the form of funds, supplies, and medical professionals and volunteers, who poured in from many other areas, particularly the Atlantic and Gulf Coast areas of the United States.

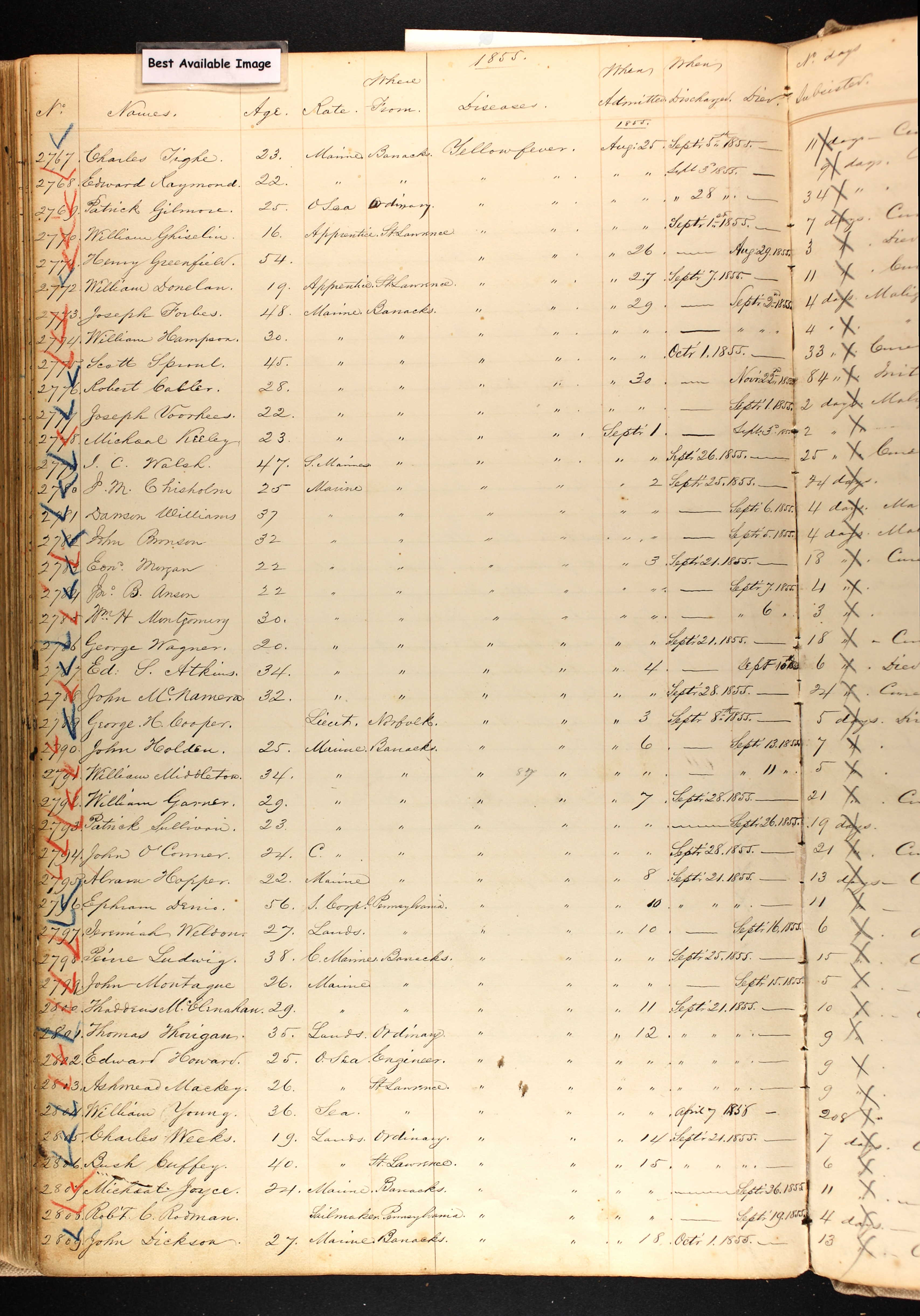
Gosport (Norfolk) Naval Hospital patient register for August 1855 and admittance of yellow fever patients; note the high mortality

== Bermuda: 1843, 1853, 1856, 1864 ==
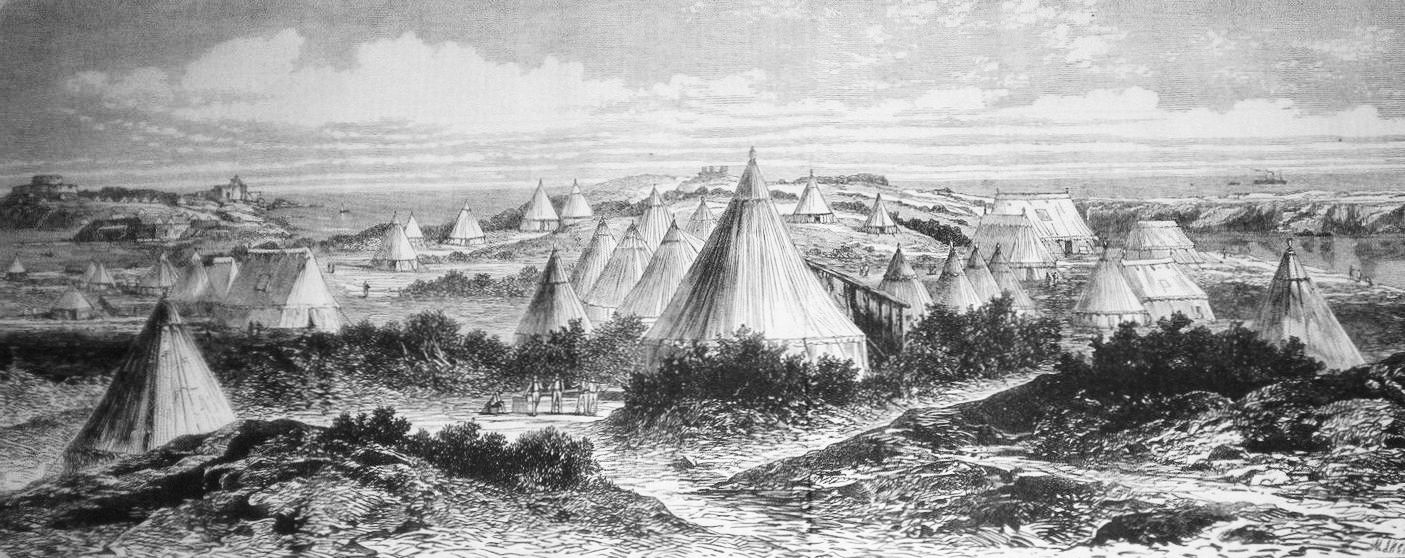
Royal Artillery and Royal Engineers moved from barracks to a tent camp at Tucker's Town, St. George's Parish, Bermuda, in 1867 to prevent the spread of Yellow fever.

Bermuda suffered four yellow fever epidemics in the 1800s, both mosquito-borne and via visiting ships, which in total claimed the lives of 13,356 people, including military and civilian population. During the 1864 epidemic, a Dr. Luke Pryor Blackburn, from Halifax, Nova Scotia, visited the island several times, to assist the local medical community on account of his knowledge of the disease. When he left in October 1864, he left behind some trunks of soiled clothing that were to have been sent to him in Canada. Fortunately, the trunks were located and the contents destroyed.

It became evident that Dr. Blackburn's visits had been financed by the Confederacy and that a certain Union informer had been offered $60,000 to distribute Dr. Blackburn's trunks of soiled clothing to Union cities including Boston, Philadelphia, Washington, and Norfolk. One trunk also went to New Bern, which was identified as having brought yellow fever to that city, claiming the lives of 2,000 people.

Blackburn was arrested and tried, but acquitted owing to lack of evidence, other than hearsay by witnesses, meaning that the culprit trunks could not be located. In 1878, he went on to fight yellow fever in Kentucky, where he had set up practice in Louisville and was eventually elected governor.

== Texas and Louisiana: 1867 ==
The 1867 yellow fever epidemic claimed many casualties in the southern counties of Texas, as well as in New Orleans. The deaths in Texas included Union Maj. Gen. Charles Griffin, Margaret Lea Houston (Mrs. Sam Houston), and at least two young physicians and their family members.

== Savannah, Georgia: 1876 ==
In 1876, a yellow fever epidemic affected Savannah, Georgia, resulting in the death of about six percent of the city's population.

== Lower Mississippi Valley: 1878 ==
In 1878, a severe yellow fever epidemic swept through the lower Mississippi Valley.

== The French Panama Canal Effort: 1882–1889 ==
The French effort to build a Panama Canal was damaged by the prevalence of endemic tropical diseases in the Isthmus. Although malaria was also a serious problem for the French canal builders, the numerous yellow fever fatalities and the fear they engendered made it difficult for the French company to retain sufficient technical staff to sustain the effort. Since the mode of transmission of the disease was unknown, the French response to the disease was limited to care of the sick. The French hospitals contained many pools of stagnant water, such as basins underneath potted plants, in which mosquitoes could breed. The numerous deaths eventually led to the failure of the French company licensed to build the canal, resulting in a massive financial crisis in France.

== See also ==
- History of public health in the United States
