= Yellow fever =

Viral disease

- Other names: Yellow jack, yellow plague, bronze john
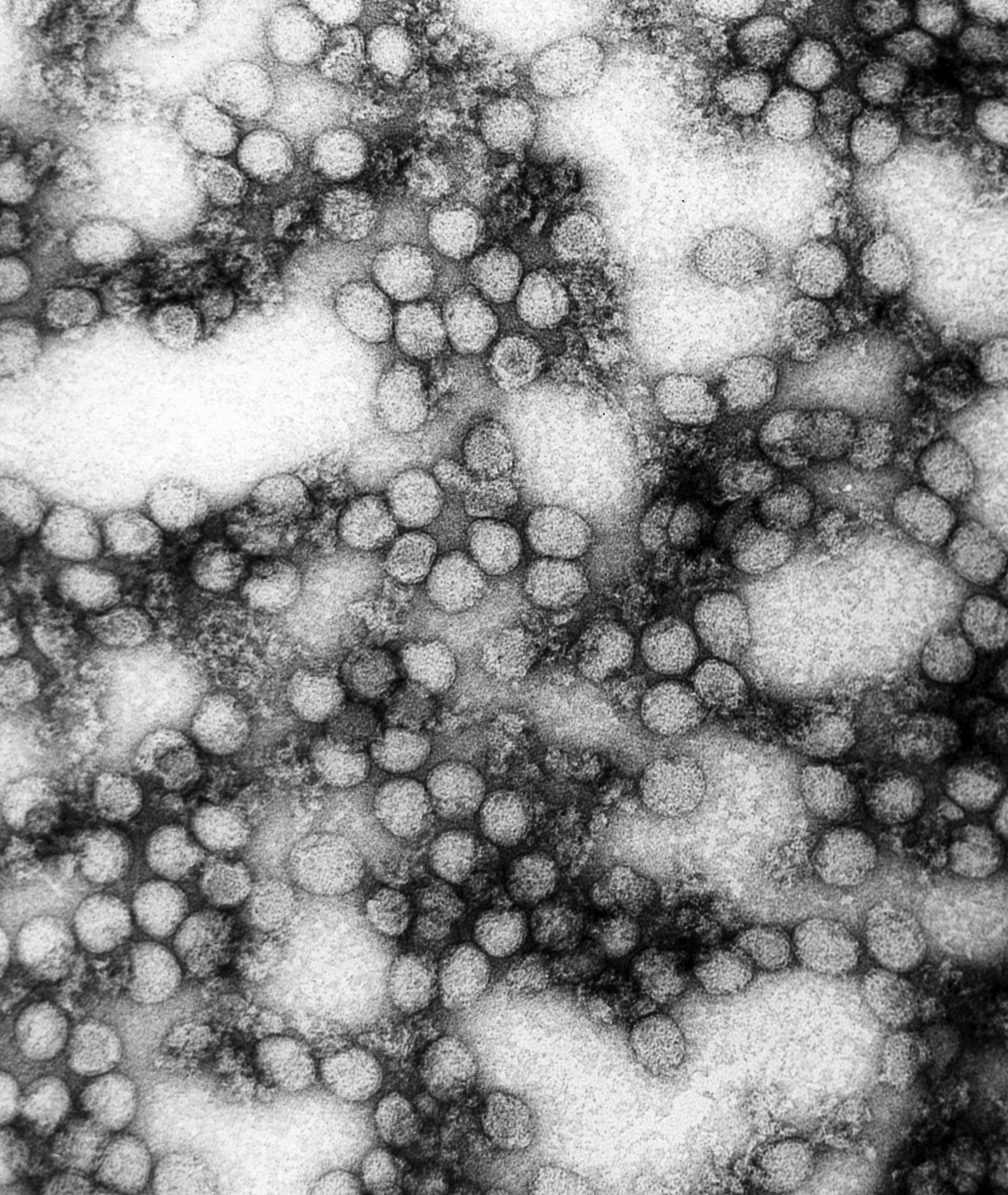
- A TEM micrograph of Yellow fever virus (234,000× magnification)
- Specialty: Infectious disease
- Symptoms: Fever, chills, muscle pain, headache, nausea, vomiting, fatigue, loss of appetite, yellow skin
- Complications: Liver failure, bleeding
- Usual onset: 3–6 days post exposure
- Duration: 3–4 days
- Causes: Yellow fever virus spread by mosquitoes
- Diagnostic method: Blood test
- Prevention: Yellow fever vaccine
- Treatment: Supportive care
- Frequency: ≈130,000 severe cases in Africa alone (2013)
- Deaths: ≈78,000 in Africa alone (2013)

Yellow fever is a viral disease of typically short duration. In most cases, symptoms include fever, chills, loss of appetite, nausea, muscle pains—particularly in the back—and headaches. Symptoms typically improve within five days. In about 15% of people, within a day of improving the fever recurs, abdominal pain occurs and liver damage begins, causing yellow skin. If this occurs, the risk of bleeding and kidney problems is increased.

The disease is caused by the yellow fever virus and is spread by the bite of an infected mosquito. It infects humans, other primates, and several types of mosquitoes. In cities, it is spread primarily by Aedes aegypti, a type of mosquito found throughout the tropics and subtropics. The virus is an RNA virus of the genus Orthoflavivirus (full scientific name Orthoflavivirus flavi). The disease may be difficult to tell apart from other illnesses, especially in the early stages. To confirm a suspected case, blood-sample testing with a polymerase chain reaction is required.

A safe and effective vaccine against yellow fever exists, and some countries require vaccinations for travelers. Other efforts to prevent infection include reducing the population of the transmitting mosquitoes. In areas where yellow fever is common, early diagnosis of cases and immunization of large parts of the population are important to prevent outbreaks. Once a person is infected, management is symptomatic; no specific measures are effective against the virus. Among those who develop jaundice, the fatality rate is 20%-50%, while the overall fatality rate is about 3 to 7.5%.

In 2013, yellow fever was estimated to have caused 130,000 severe infections and 78,000 deaths in Africa. Approximately 90 percent of an estimated 200,000 cases of yellow fever per year occur in Africa. Nearly a billion people live in an area of the world where the disease is common. It is common in tropical areas of the continents of South America and Africa, but not in Asia. Since the 1980s, the number of cases of yellow fever has been increasing. This is believed to be due to fewer people being immune, more people living in cities, people moving frequently, and changing climate increasing the habitat for mosquitoes.

The disease originated in Africa and spread to the Americas starting in the 17th century with the European trafficking of enslaved Africans from sub-Saharan Africa. Since the 17th century, several major outbreaks of the disease have occurred in the Americas, Africa, and Europe. In the 18th and 19th centuries, yellow fever was considered one of the most dangerous infectious diseases; numerous epidemics swept through major cities of the US and in other parts of the world.

In 1927, the yellow fever virus became the first human virus to be isolated.

== Signs and symptoms ==
Yellow fever begins after an incubation period of three to six days. Most cases cause only mild infection with fever, headache, chills, back pain, fatigue, loss of appetite, muscle pain, nausea, and vomiting. In these cases, the infection lasts only three to six days.

In 15% of cases, the disease enters a second, toxic phase, characterized by recurring fever, accompanied by jaundice caused by liver damage, as well as abdominal pain. Bleeding in the mouth, nose, eyes and gastrointestinal tract causes vomit containing blood, hence one of the names in Spanish for yellow fever, vómito negro ("black vomit"). There may also be kidney failure, hiccups, and delirium.

Among those who develop jaundice, the fatality rate is 20%-50%, while the overall fatality rate is about 3 to 7.5%. Severe cases may have a mortality rate greater than 50%.

Surviving the infection provides lifelong immunity, generally with no permanent organ damage.

=== Complication ===
Yellow fever can lead to death for 20% to 50% of those who develop severe disease. Jaundice, fatigue, heart rhythm problems, seizures and internal bleeding may also appear as complications of yellow fever during recovery time.

== Cause ==
Yellow fever virus
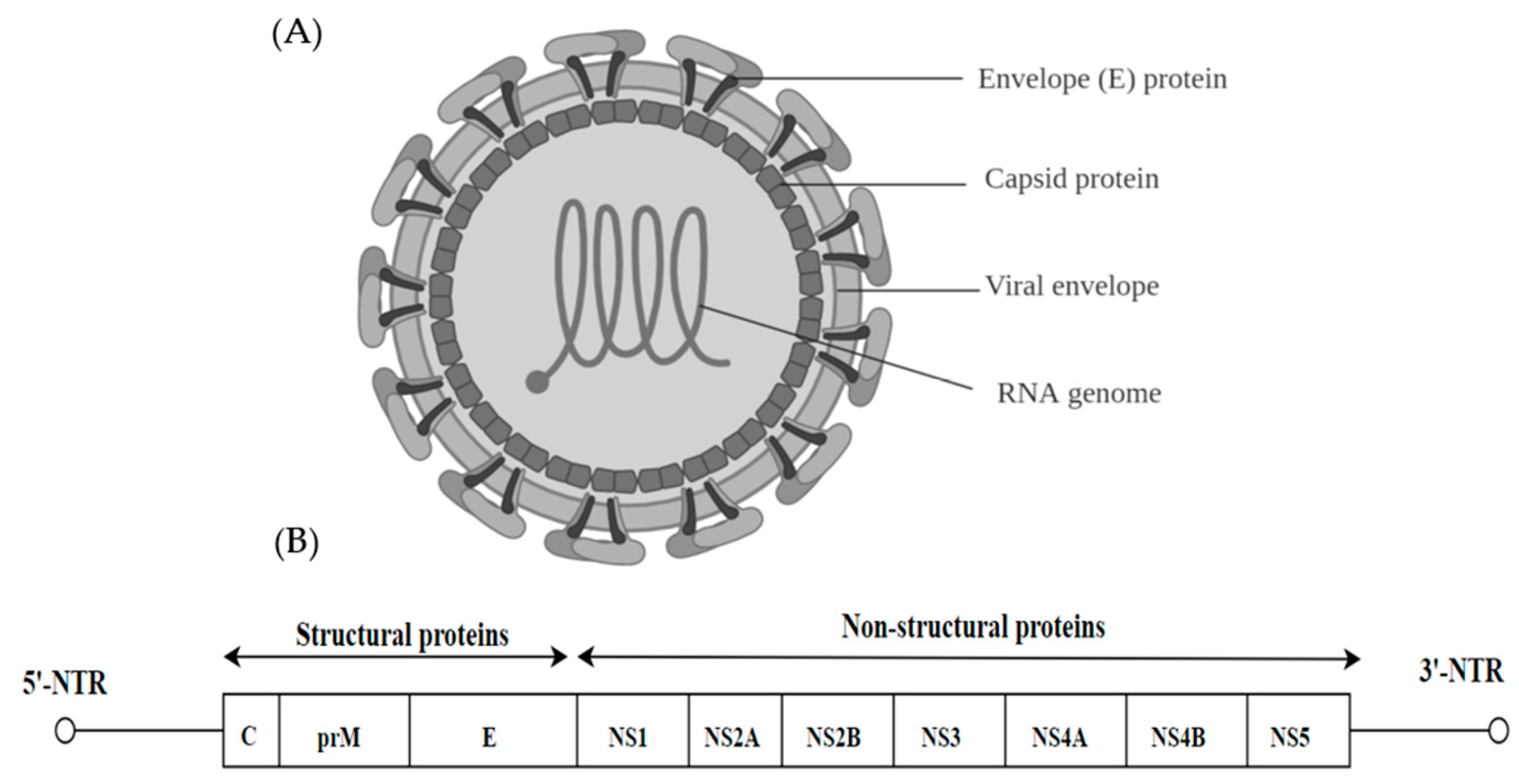
- Flavivirus structure and genome

Virus classification
- (unranked): Virus
- Realm: Riboviria
- Kingdom: Orthornavirae
- Phylum: Kitrinoviricota
- Class: Flasuviricetes
- Order: Amarillovirales
- Family: Flaviviridae
- Genus: Orthoflavivirus
- Subgenus: Euflavivirus
- Species: Orthoflavivirus flavi

Yellow fever is caused by Yellow fever virus (YFV), an enveloped RNA virus 40–50 nm in width, the type species and namesake of the family Flaviviridae. It was the first illness shown to be transmissible by filtered human serum and transmitted by mosquitoes, by American doctor Walter Reed around 1900. The positive-sense, single-stranded RNA is around 10,862 nucleotides long and has a single open reading frame encoding a polyprotein. Host proteases cut this polyprotein into three structural (C, prM, E) and seven nonstructural proteins (NS1, NS2A, NS2B, NS3, NS4A, NS4B, NS5); the enumeration corresponds to the arrangement of the protein coding genes in the genome. Minimal YFV 3′UTR region is required for stalling of the host 5′-3′ exonuclease XRN1. The UTR contains PKS3 pseudoknot structure, which serves as a molecular signal to stall the exonuclease and is the only viral requirement for subgenomic flavivirus RNA (sfRNA) production. The sfRNAs are a result of incomplete degradation of the viral genome by the exonuclease and are important for viral pathogenicity. Yellow fever belongs to the group of hemorrhagic fevers.

The viruses infect, amongst others, monocytes, macrophages, Schwann cells, and dendritic cells. They attach to the cell surfaces via specific receptors and are taken up by an endosomal vesicle. Inside the endosome, the decreased pH induces the fusion of the endosomal membrane with the virus envelope. The capsid enters the cytosol, decays, and releases the genome. Receptor binding, as well as membrane fusion, are catalyzed by the protein E, which changes its conformation at low pH, causing a rearrangement of the 90 homodimers to 60 homotrimers.

After entering the host cell, the viral genome is replicated in the rough endoplasmic reticulum (ER) and in the so-called vesicle packets. At first, an immature form of the virus particle is produced inside the ER, whose M-protein is not yet cleaved to its mature form, so is denoted as precursor M (prM) and forms a complex with protein E. The immature particles are processed in the Golgi apparatus by the host protein furin, which cleaves prM to M. This releases E from the complex, which can now take its place in the mature, infectious virion.

=== Transmission ===
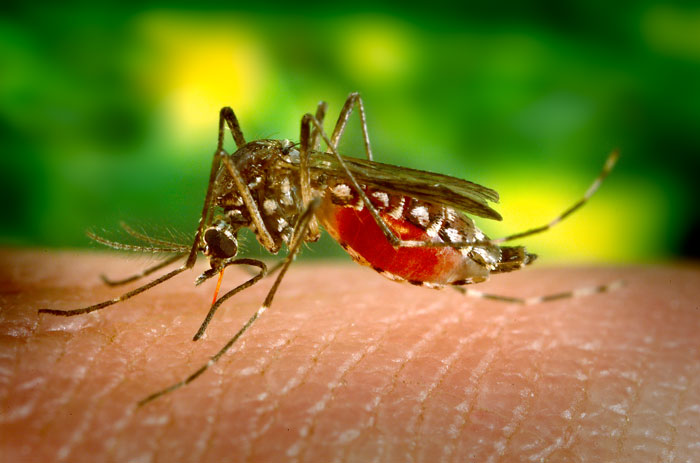
Aedes aegypti feeding

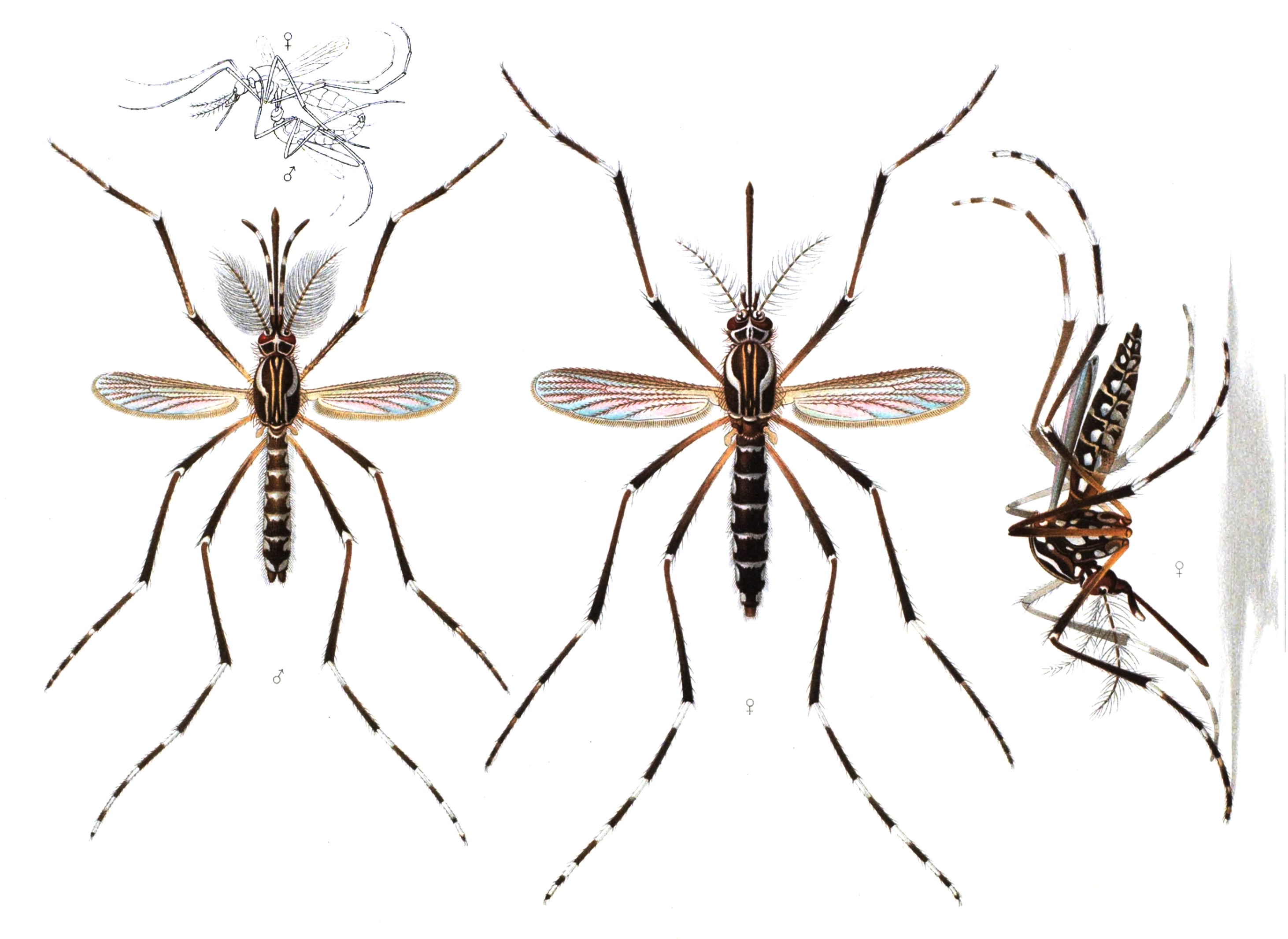
Adults of the yellow fever mosquito A. aegypti: The male is on the left, females are on the right. Only the female mosquito bites humans to transmit the disease.

Yellow fever virus is mainly transmitted through the bite of the yellow fever mosquito Aedes aegypti, but other mostly Aedes mosquitoes such as the tiger mosquito (Aedes albopictus) can also serve as a vector for this virus. Like other arboviruses, which are transmitted by mosquitoes, Yellow fever virus is taken up by a female mosquito when it ingests the blood of an infected human or another primate. Viruses reach the stomach of the mosquito, and if the virus concentration is high enough, the virions can infect epithelial cells and replicate there. From there, they reach the haemocoel (the blood system of mosquitoes) and from there the salivary glands. When the mosquito next sucks blood, it injects its saliva into the wound, and the virus reaches the bloodstream of the bitten person. Transovarial transmissionial and transstadial transmission of yellow fever virus within A. aegypti, that is, the transmission from a female mosquito to its eggs and then larvae, are indicated. This infection of vectors without a previous blood meal seems to play a role in single, sudden breakouts of the disease.

Three epidemiologically different infectious cycles occur in which the virus is transmitted from mosquitoes to humans or other primates. In the "urban cycle", only the yellow fever mosquito A. aegypti is involved. It is well adapted to urban areas, and can also transmit other diseases, including Zika fever, dengue fever, and chikungunya. The urban cycle is responsible for the major outbreaks of yellow fever that occur in Africa. Except for an outbreak in Bolivia in 1999, this urban cycle no longer exists in South America.

Besides the urban cycle, both in Africa and South America, a sylvatic cycle (forest or jungle cycle) is present, where Aedes africanus (in Africa) or mosquitoes of the genus Haemagogus and Sabethes (in South America) serve as vectors. In the jungle, the mosquitoes infect mainly nonhuman primates; the disease is mostly asymptomatic in African primates. In South America, the sylvatic cycle is currently the only way unvaccinated humans can become infected, which explains the low incidence of yellow fever cases on the continent. People who become infected in the jungle can carry the virus to urban areas, where A. aegypti acts as a vector. Because of this sylvatic cycle, yellow fever cannot be eradicated except by completely eradicating the mosquitoes that serve as vectors.

In Africa, a third infectious cycle known as "savannah cycle" or intermediate cycle, occurs between the jungle and urban cycles. Different mosquitoes of the genus Aedes are involved. In recent years, this has been the most common form of transmission of yellow fever in Africa.

Concern exists about yellow fever spreading to southeast Asia, where its vector A. aegypti already occurs.

== Pathogenesis ==
After transmission from a mosquito, the viruses replicate in the lymph nodes and infect dendritic cells in particular. From there, they reach the liver and infect hepatocytes (probably indirectly via Kupffer cells), which leads to eosinophilic degradation of these cells and to the release of cytokines. Apoptotic masses known as Councilman bodies appear in the cytoplasm of hepatocytes.

Fatality may occur when cytokine storm, shock, and multiple organ failure follow.

== Diagnosis ==
Yellow fever is most frequently a clinical diagnosis, based on symptomatology and travel history. Mild cases of the disease can only be confirmed virologically. Since mild cases of yellow fever can also contribute significantly to regional outbreaks, every suspected case of yellow fever (involving symptoms of fever, pain, nausea, and vomiting 6–10 days after leaving the affected area) is treated seriously.

If yellow fever is suspected, the virus cannot be confirmed until 6–10 days following the illness. A direct confirmation can be obtained by reverse transcription polymerase chain reaction, where the genome of the virus is amplified. Another direct approach is the isolation of the virus and its growth in cell culture using blood plasma; this can take 1–4 weeks.

Serologically, an enzyme-linked immunosorbent assay during the acute phase of the disease using specific IgM against yellow fever or an increase in specific IgG titer (compared to an earlier sample) can confirm yellow fever. Together with clinical symptoms, the detection of IgM or a four-fold increase in IgG titer is considered sufficient indication for yellow fever. As these tests can cross-react with other flaviviruses, such as dengue virus, these indirect methods cannot conclusively prove yellow fever infection.

Liver biopsy can verify inflammation and necrosis of hepatocytes and detect viral antigens. Because of the bleeding tendency of yellow fever patients, a biopsy is only advisable post mortem to confirm the cause of death.

In a differential diagnosis, infections with yellow fever must be distinguished from other feverish illnesses such as malaria. Other viral hemorrhagic fevers, such as Ebola virus, Lassa virus, Marburg virus, and Junin virus, must be excluded as the cause.

== Prevention ==
Personal prevention of yellow fever includes vaccination and avoidance of mosquito bites in areas where yellow fever is endemic. Institutional measures for the prevention of yellow fever include vaccination programmes and measures to control mosquitoes. Programmes for distribution of mosquito nets for use in homes produce reductions in malaria and yellow fever. EPA-registered insect repellent is recommended when outdoors. Exposure for even a short time is enough for a potential mosquito bite. Long-sleeved clothing, long pants, and socks are useful for prevention. Applying larvicides to water-storage containers can help eliminate potential mosquito breeding sites. EPA-registered insecticide spray decreases the transmission of yellow fever.

- Use insect repellent when outdoors such as those containing DEET, picaridin, ethyl butylacetylaminopropionate (IR3535), or oil of lemon eucalyptus on exposed skin.
- Mosquitoes may bite through thin clothing, so spraying clothes with repellent containing permethrin or another EPA-registered repellent gives extra protection. Clothing treated with permethrin is commercially available. Mosquito repellents containing permethrin are not approved for application directly to the skin.
- The peak biting times for many mosquito species are dusk to dawn. However, A. aegypti, one of the mosquitoes that transmit yellow fever virus, feeds during the daytime. Staying in accommodations with screened or air-conditioned rooms, particularly during peak biting times, also reduces the risk of mosquito bites.

=== Vaccination ===
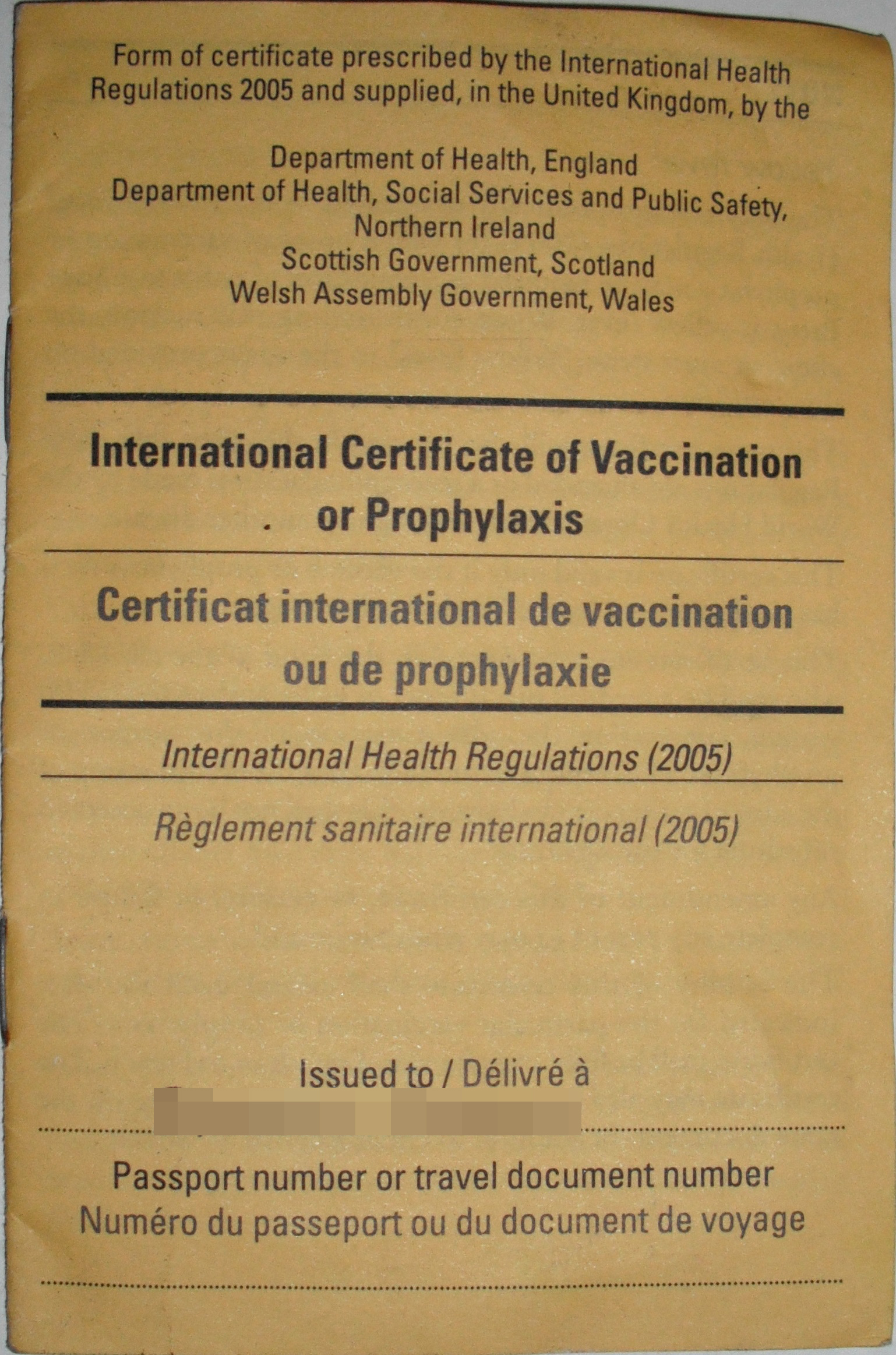
The cover of a certificate that confirms the holder has been vaccinated against yellow fever

Vaccination against yellow fever 10 days before entering this country/territory is required for travellers coming from... All countries Risk countries (including airport transfers) (Note: Also required for travellers having transited (more than 12 hours) through a risk country's airport) Risk countries (excluding airport transfers) (Note: Not required for travellers having transited through a risk country's airport) No requirement (risk country) (Note: The WHO has designated (parts of) Argentina, Brazil, and Peru as risk countries, but these countries do not require incoming travellers to vaccinate against yellow fever.) No requirement (non-risk country)

Vaccination is recommended for those traveling to affected areas, because non-native people tend to develop more severe illness when infected. Protection begins by the 10th day after vaccine administration in 95% of people, and had been reported to last for at least 10 years. The World Health Organization (WHO) now states that a single dose of vaccine is sufficient to confer lifelong immunity against yellow fever disease. The attenuated live vaccine stem 17D was developed in 1937 by Max Theiler. The WHO recommends routine vaccination for people living in affected areas between the 9th and 12th month after birth.

Up to one in four people experience fever, aches, local soreness, and redness at the injection site. In rare cases (less than one in 200,000 to 300,000), the vaccination can cause yellow fever vaccine-associated viscerotropic disease, which is fatal in 60% of cases. It is probably due to the genetic morphology of the immune system. Another possible side effect is an infection of the nervous system, which occurs in one in 200,000 to 300,000 cases, causing yellow fever vaccine-associated neurotropic disease, which can lead to meningoencephalitis and is fatal in less than 5% of cases.

The Yellow Fever Initiative, launched by the WHO in 2006, vaccinated more than 105 million people in 14 countries in West Africa. No outbreaks were reported during 2015. The campaign was supported by the GAVI alliance and governmental organizations in Europe and Africa. According to the WHO, mass vaccination cannot eliminate yellow fever because of the vast number of infected mosquitoes in urban areas of the target countries, but it will significantly reduce the number of people infected.

Demand for yellow fever vaccines has continued to increase due to the growing number of countries implementing yellow fever vaccination as part of their routine immunization programmes. Recent upsurges in yellow fever outbreaks in Angola (2015), the Democratic Republic of Congo (2016), Uganda (2016), and more recently in Nigeria and Brazil in 2017 have further increased demand, while straining global vaccine supply. Therefore, to vaccinate susceptible populations in preventive mass immunization campaigns during outbreaks, fractional dosing of the vaccine is being considered as a dose-sparing strategy to maximize limited vaccine supplies. Fractional dose yellow fever vaccination refers to administration of a reduced volume of vaccine dose, which has been reconstituted as per manufacturer recommendations. The first practical use of fractional dose yellow fever vaccination was in response to a large yellow fever outbreak in the Democratic Republic of the Congo in mid-2016. Available evidence shows that fractional dose yellow fever vaccination induces a level of immune response similar to that of the standard full dose.

In March 2017, the WHO launched a vaccination campaign in Brazil with 3.5 million doses from an emergency stockpile. In March 2017 the WHO recommended vaccination for travellers to certain parts of Brazil. In March 2018, Brazil shifted its policy and announced it planned to vaccinate all 77.5 million currently unvaccinated citizens by April 2019.

==== Compulsory vaccination ====
Some countries in Asia are considered to be potentially in danger of yellow fever epidemics, as both mosquitoes with the capability to transmit yellow fever as well as susceptible monkeys are present. The disease does not yet occur in Asia. To prevent the introduction of the virus, some countries demand previous vaccination of foreign visitors who have passed through yellow fever areas. Vaccination has to be proved by a vaccination certificate, which is valid 10 days after the vaccination and lasts for 10 years. Although the WHO on 17 May 2013 advised that subsequent booster vaccinations are unnecessary, an older (than 10 years) certificate may not be acceptable at all border posts in all affected countries. A list of the countries that require yellow fever vaccination is published by the WHO. If the vaccination cannot be given for some reason, dispensation may be possible. In this case, an exemption certificate issued by a WHO-approved vaccination center is required. Although 32 of 44 countries where yellow fever occurs endemically do have vaccination programmes, in many of these countries, less than 50% of their population is vaccinated.

=== Vector control ===
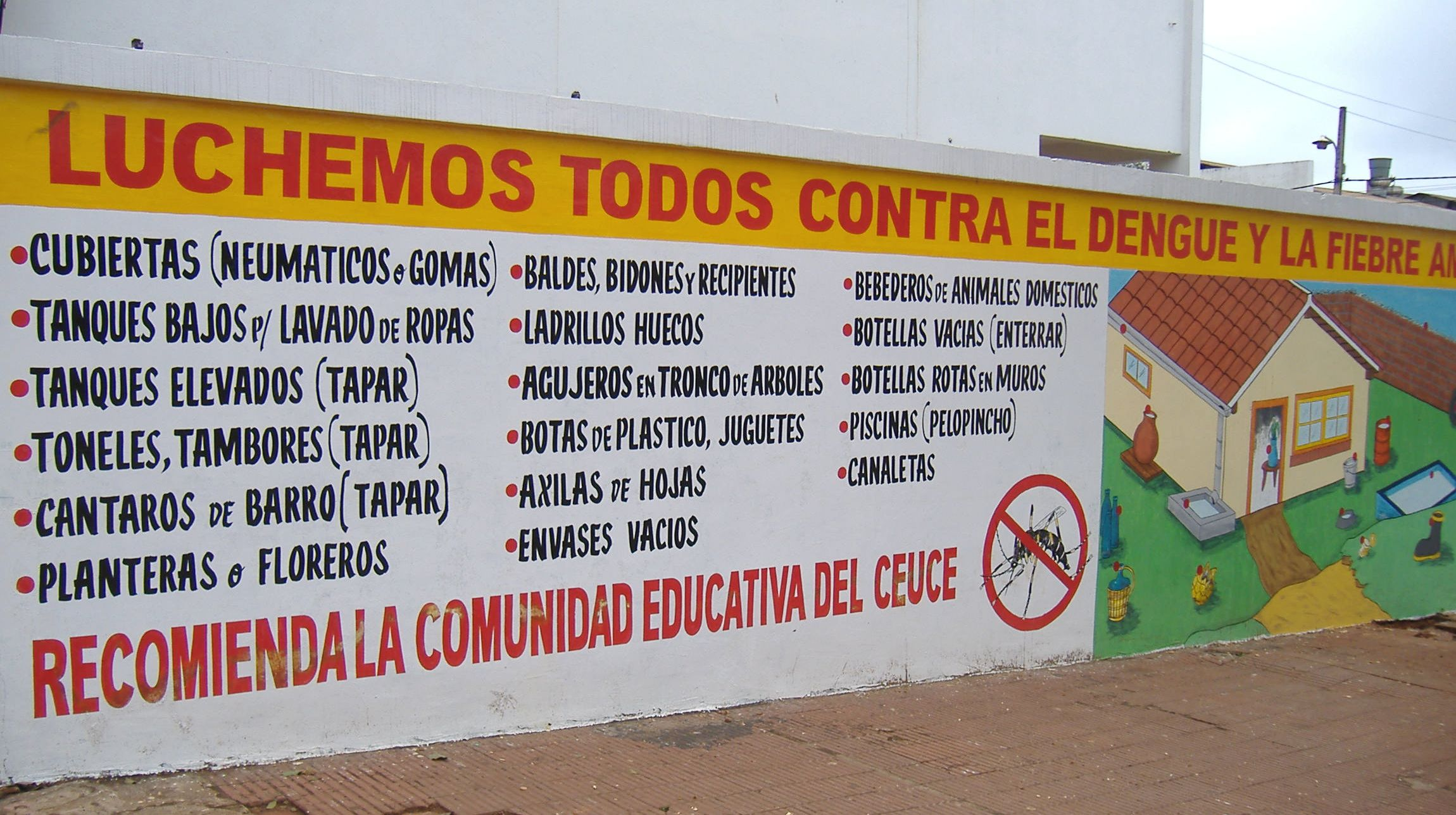
Information campaign for prevention of dengue and yellow fever in Paraguay

Control of the yellow fever mosquito A. aegypti is of major importance, especially because the same mosquito can also transmit dengue fever and chikungunya disease. A. aegypti breeds preferentially in water, for example, in installations by inhabitants of areas with precarious drinking water supplies, or in domestic refuse, especially tires, cans, and plastic bottles. These conditions are common in urban areas in developing countries.

Two main strategies are employed to reduce A. aegypti populations. One approach is to kill the developing larvae. Measures are taken to reduce the water accumulations in which the larvae develop. Larvicides are used, along with larvae-eating fish and copepods, which reduce the number of larvae. For many years, copepods of the genus Mesocyclops have been used in Vietnam for preventing dengue fever. This eradicated the mosquito vector in several areas. Similar efforts may prove effective against yellow fever. Pyriproxyfen is recommended as a chemical larvicide, mainly because it is safe for humans and effective in small doses.

The second strategy is to reduce populations of the adult yellow fever mosquito. Lethal ovitraps can reduce Aedes populations, using lesser amounts of pesticide because it targets the pest directly. Curtains and lids of water tanks can be sprayed with insecticides, but application inside houses is not recommended by the WHO. Insecticide-treated mosquito nets are effective, just as they are against the Anopheles mosquito that carries malaria.

== Treatment ==
As with other Flavivirus infections, no cure is known for yellow fever. Hospitalization is advisable and intensive care may be necessary because of rapid deterioration in some cases. Certain acute treatment methods lack efficacy: passive immunization after the emergence of symptoms is probably without effect; ribavirin and other antiviral drugs, as well as treatment with interferons, are ineffective in yellow fever patients. Symptomatic treatment includes rehydration and pain relief with drugs such as paracetamol (acetaminophen). However, aspirin and other non-steroidal anti-inflammatory drugs (NSAIDs) are often avoided because of an increased risk of gastrointestinal bleeding due to their anticoagulant effects.

== Epidemiology ==
Yellow fever is common in tropical and subtropical areas of South America and Africa. Worldwide, about 600 million people live in endemic areas. The WHO estimates 200,000 cases of yellow fever worldwide each year. About 15% of people infected with yellow fever progress to a severe form of the illness, and up to half of those will die, as there is no cure for yellow fever.

=== Africa ===
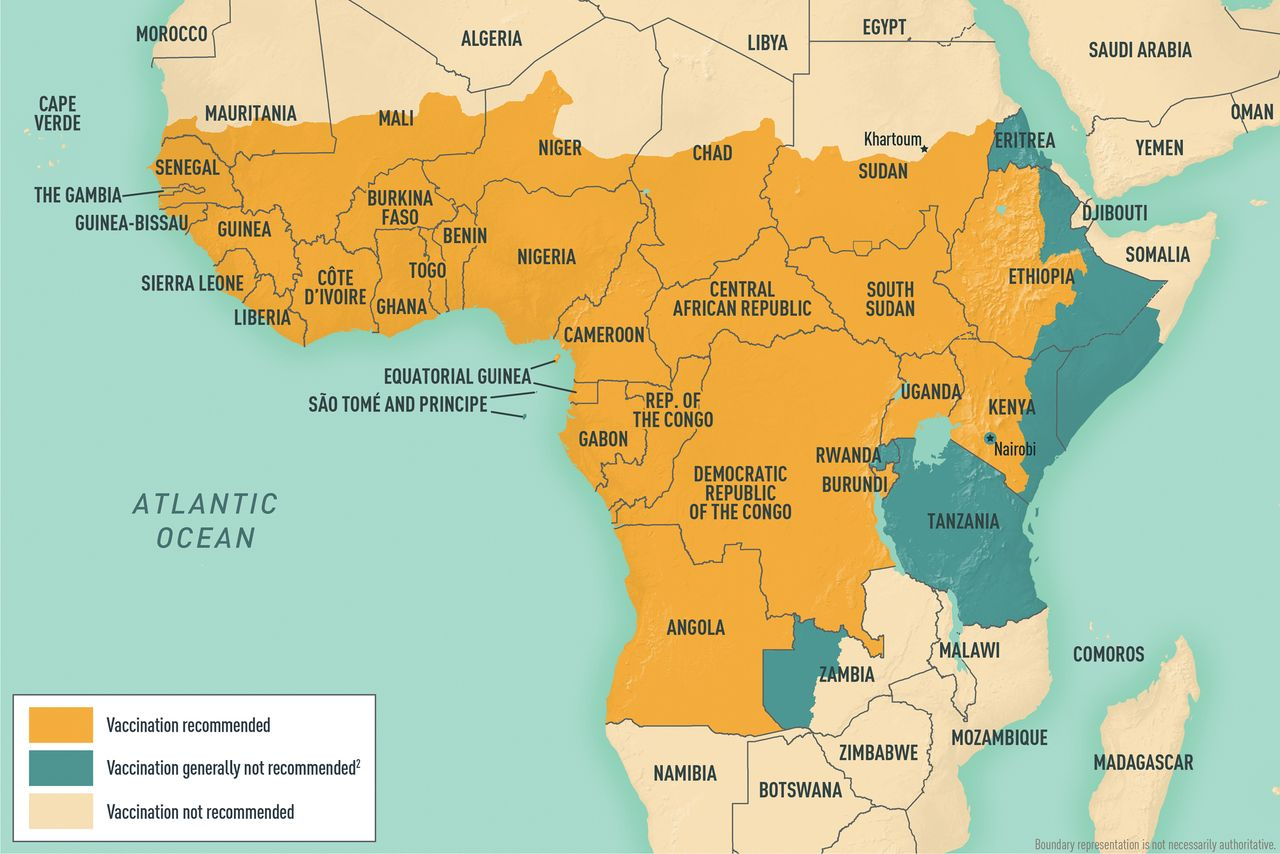
Areas with risk of yellow fever in Africa (2017)

An estimated 90% of yellow fever infections occur on the African continent. In 2016, a large outbreak originated in Angola and spread to neighboring countries before being contained by a massive vaccination campaign. In March and April 2016, 11 imported cases of the Angola genotype in unvaccinated Chinese nationals were reported in China, the first appearance of the disease in Asia in recorded history.

Phylogenetic analysis has identified seven genotypes of yellow fever viruses, and they are assumed to be differently adapted to humans and to the vector A. aegypti. Five genotypes (Angola, Central/East Africa, East Africa, West Africa I, and West Africa II) occur only in Africa. West Africa genotype I is found in Nigeria and the surrounding region. West Africa genotype I appears to be especially infectious, as it is often associated with major outbreaks. The three genotypes found outside of Nigeria and Angola occur in areas where outbreaks are rare. Two outbreaks, in Kenya (1992–1993) and Sudan (2003 and 2005), involved the East African genotype, which had remained undetected in the previous 40 years.

=== South America ===
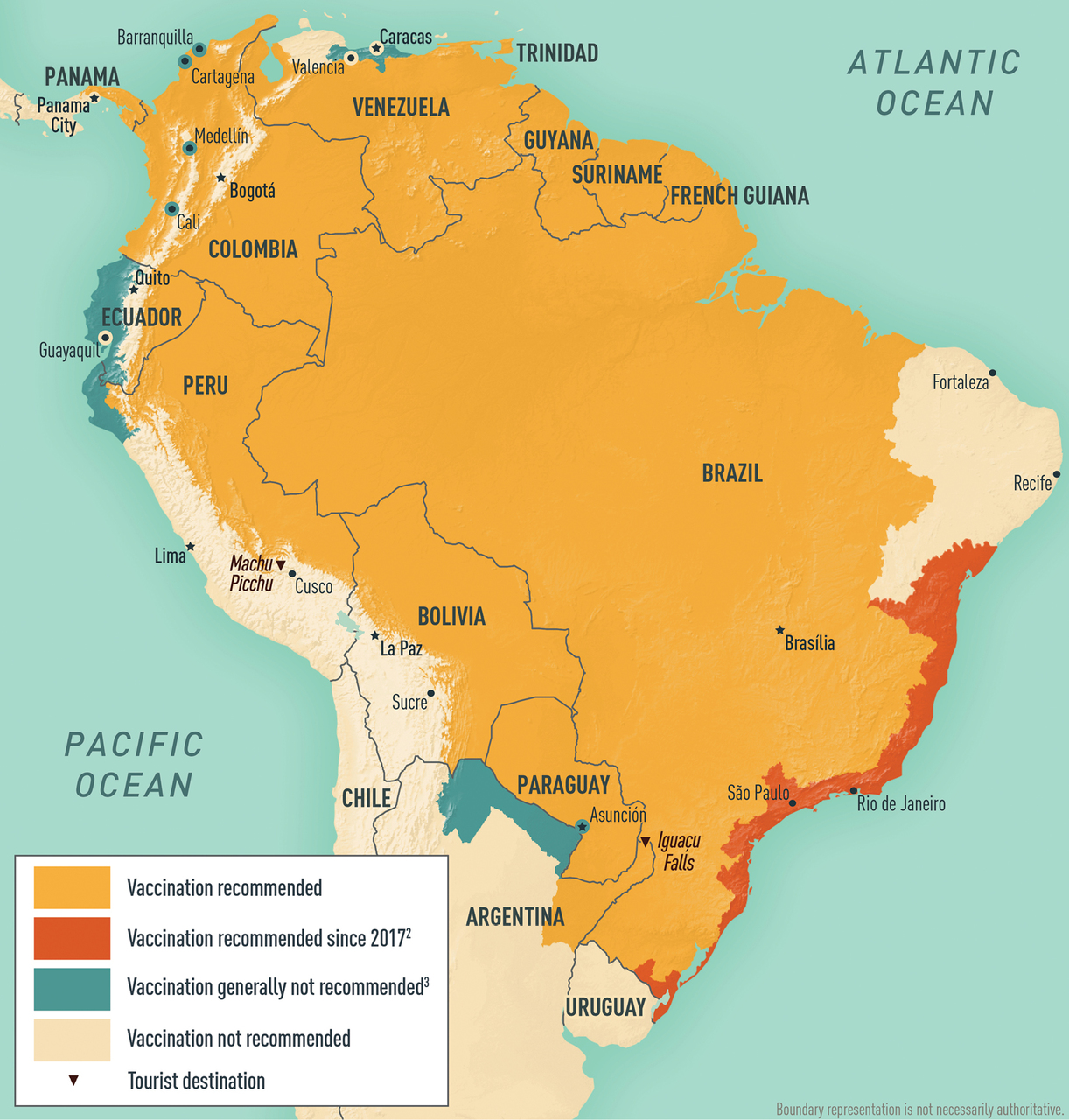
Areas with risk of yellow fever in South America (2018)

In South America, two genotypes have been identified (South American genotypes I and II). Based on phylogenetic analysis these two genotypes appear to have originated in West Africa and were first introduced into Brazil. The date of introduction of the predecessor African genotype which gave rise to the South American genotypes appears to be 1822 (95% confidence interval 1701 to 1911). The historical record shows an outbreak of yellow fever occurred in Recife, Brazil, between 1685 and 1690. The disease seems to have disappeared, with the next outbreak occurring in 1849. It was likely introduced with the trafficking of slaves through the slave trade from Africa. Genotype I has been divided into five subclades, A through E.

In late 2016, a large outbreak began in Minas Gerais state of Brazil that was characterized as a sylvatic or jungle epizootic. Real-time phylogenetic investigations at the epicentre of the outbreak revealed that the outbreak was caused by the introduction of a virus lineage from the Amazon region into the southeast region around July 2016, spreading rapidly across several neotropical monkey species, including brown howler monkeys, which serve as a sentinel species for yellow fever. No cases had been transmitted between humans by the A. aegypti mosquito, which can sustain urban outbreaks that can spread rapidly. In April 2017, the sylvatic outbreak continued moving toward the Brazilian coast, where most people were unvaccinated. By the end of May the outbreak appeared to be declining after more than 3,000 suspected cases, 758 confirmed and 264 deaths confirmed to be yellow fever. The Health Ministry launched a vaccination campaign and was concerned about spread during the Carnival season in February and March. The CDC issued a Level 2 alert (practice enhanced precautions.)

A Bayesian analysis of genotypes I and II has shown that genotype I accounts for virtually all the current infections in Brazil, Colombia, Venezuela, and Trinidad and Tobago, while genotype II accounted for all cases in Peru. Genotype I originated in the northern Brazilian region around 1908 (95% highest posterior density interval [HPD]: 1870–1936). Genotype II originated in Peru in 1920 (95% HPD: 1867–1958). The estimated rate of mutation for both genotypes was about 5 × 10^{−4} substitutions/site/year, similar to that of other RNA viruses.

=== Asia ===
The main vector (A. aegypti) also occurs in tropical and subtropical regions of Asia, the Pacific, and Australia, but yellow fever had never occurred there until jet travel introduced 11 cases from the 2016 Angola and DR Congo yellow fever outbreak in Africa. Proposed explanations include:

- That the strains of the mosquito in the east are less able to transmit Yellow fever virus.
- That immunity is present in the populations because of other diseases caused by related viruses (for example, dengue).
- That the disease was never introduced because the shipping trade was insufficient.

But none is considered satisfactory. Another proposal is the absence of a slave trade to Asia on the scale of that to the Americas. The trans-Atlantic slave trade probably introduced yellow fever into the Western Hemisphere from Africa.

== History ==
=== Early history ===
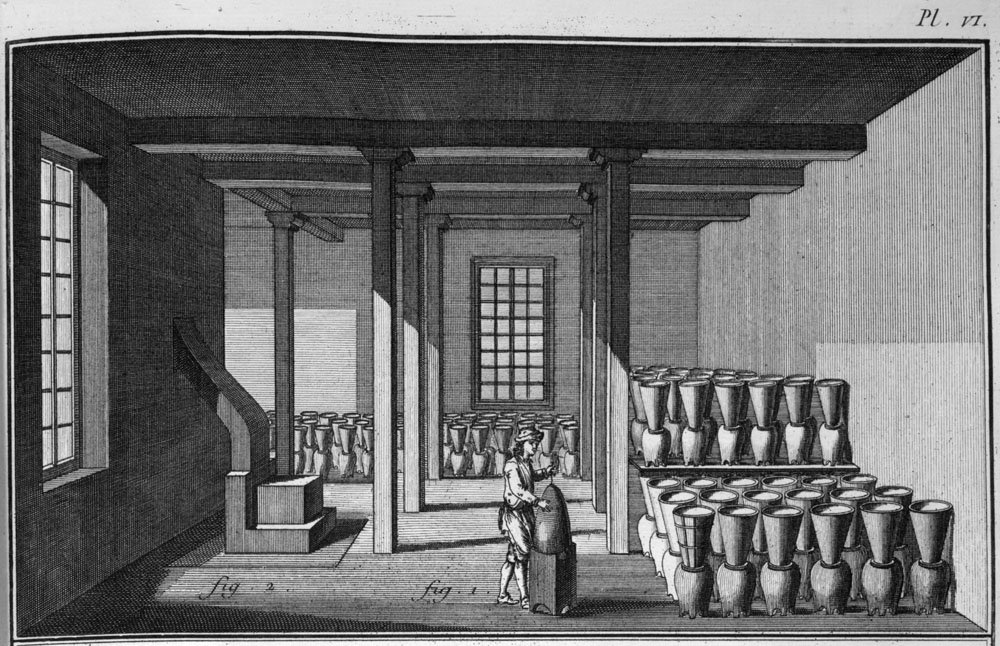
Sugar curing house, 1762: Sugar pots and jars on sugar plantations served as breeding place for larvae of A. aegypti, the vector of yellow fever.

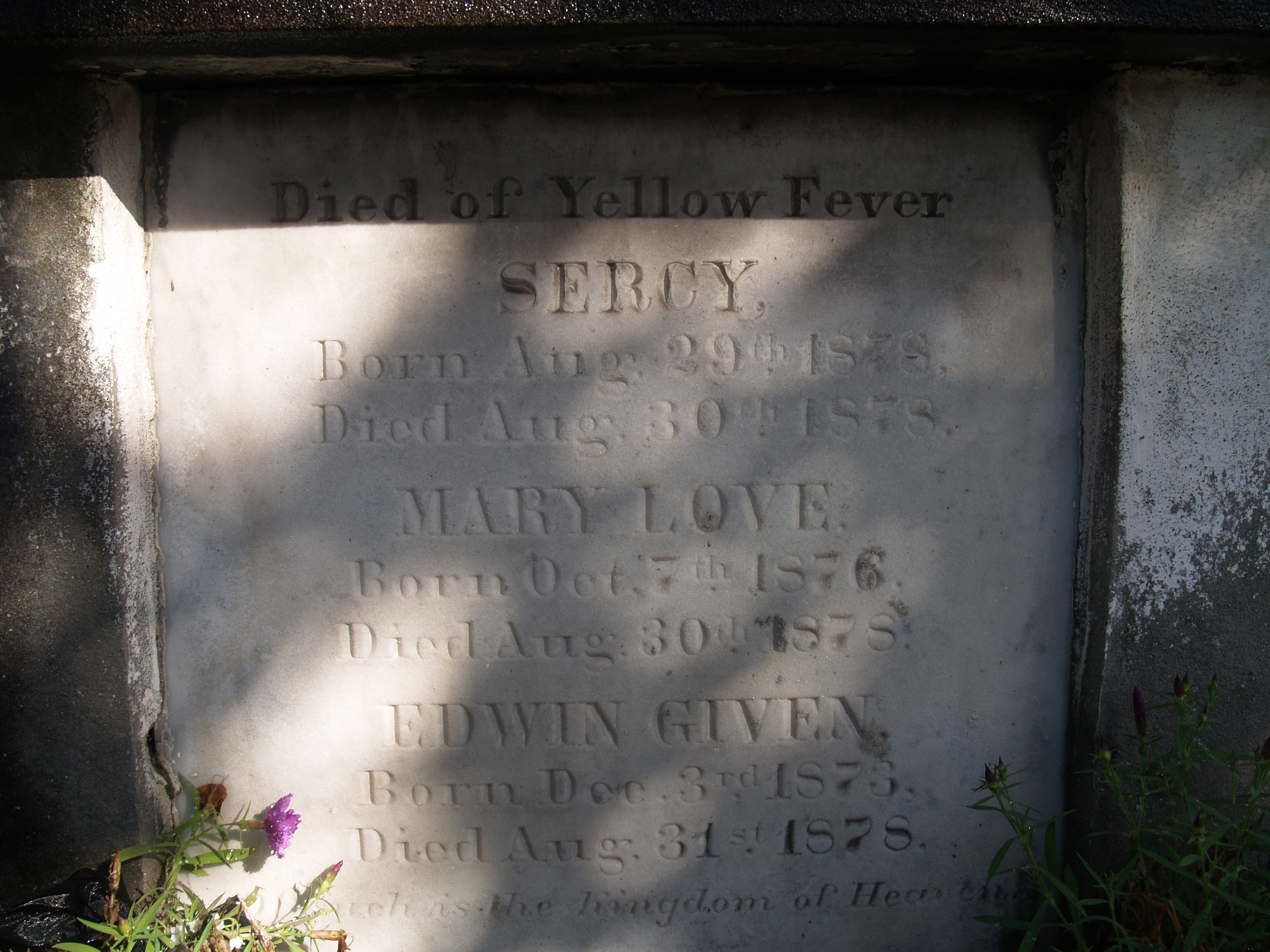
Headstones of people who died in the yellow fever epidemic of 1878 can be found in New Orleans' cemeteries.

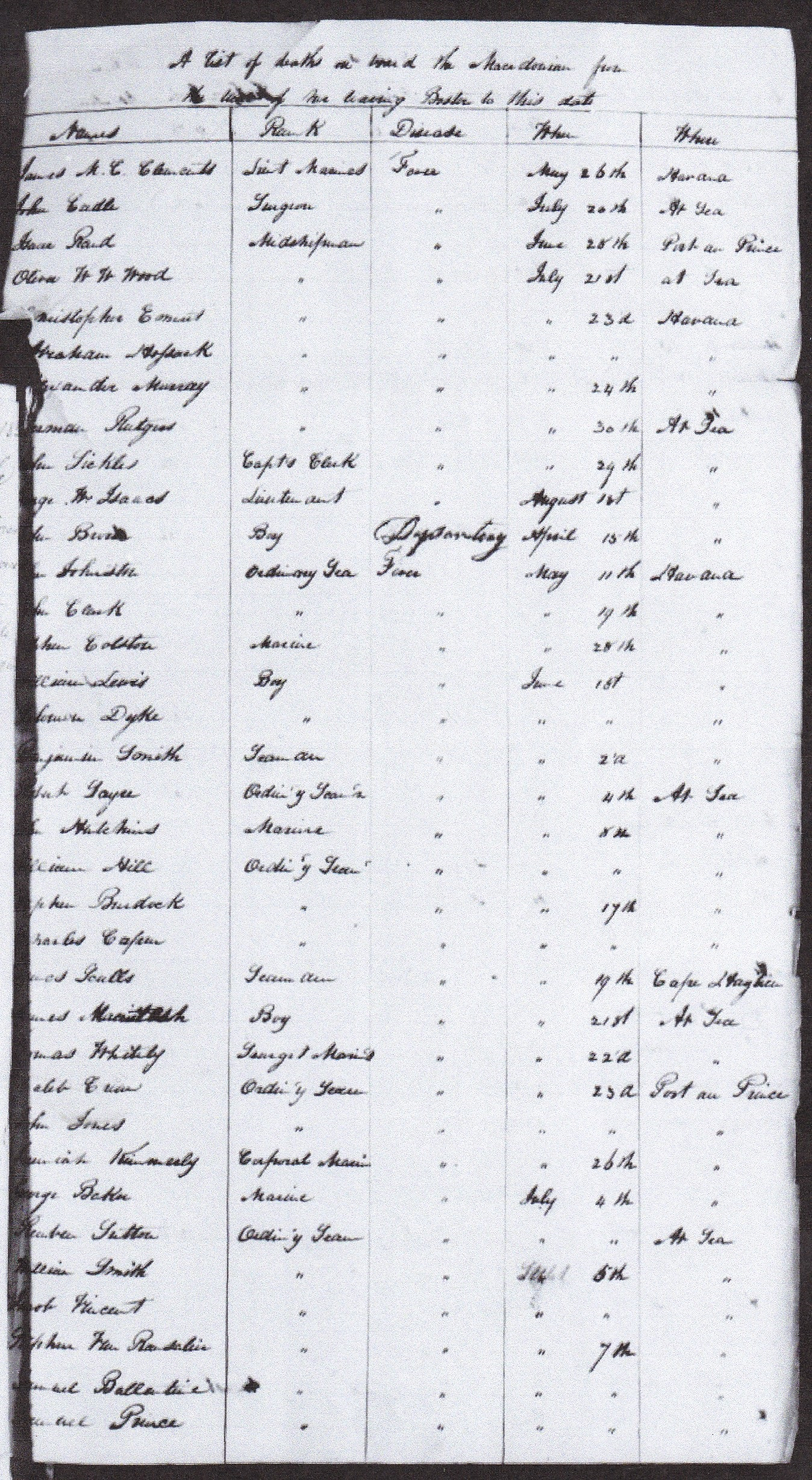
A page from Commodore James Biddle's list of the 76 dead (74 of yellow fever) aboard the USS Macedonian, dated 3 August 1822

The evolutionary origins of yellow fever most likely lie in Africa, with transmission of the disease from nonhuman primates to humans. The virus is thought to have originated in East or Central Africa and spread from there to West Africa. As it was endemic in Africa, local populations had developed some immunity to it. When an outbreak of yellow fever would occur in an African community where colonists resided, most Europeans died, while the indigenous Africans usually developed nonlethal symptoms resembling influenza. This phenomenon, in which certain populations develop immunity to yellow fever due to prolonged exposure in their childhood, is known as acquired immunity. The virus, as well as the vector A. aegypti, were probably transferred to North and South America with the trafficking of slaves from Africa, part of the Columbian exchange following European exploration and colonization. However, some researchers have argued that yellow fever might have existed in the Americas during the pre-Columbian period as mosquitoes of the genus Haemagogus, which is indigenous to the Americas, have been known to carry the disease.

The first definitive outbreak of yellow fever in the New World was in 1647 on the island of Barbados. An outbreak was recorded by Spanish colonists in 1648 in the Yucatán Peninsula, where the indigenous Mayan people called the illness xekik ("blood vomit"). In 1685, Brazil suffered its first epidemic in Recife. Dr. John Mitchell of Virginia made the first recorded mention of a disease by the name "yellow fever" in 1744. However, Mitchell misdiagnosed the disease that he observed and treated, which was probably Weil's disease or hepatitis.

McNeill argues that the environmental and ecological disruption caused by the introduction of sugar plantations created the conditions for mosquito and viral reproduction, and subsequent outbreaks of yellow fever. Deforestation reduced populations of insectivorous birds and other creatures that fed on mosquitoes and their eggs.

In Colonial times and during the Napoleonic Wars, the West Indies were known as a particularly dangerous posting for soldiers due to yellow fever being endemic in the area. The mortality rate in British garrisons in Jamaica was seven times that of garrisons in Canada, mostly because of yellow fever and other tropical diseases. Both English and French forces posted there were seriously affected by the "yellow jack". Wanting to regain control of the highly profitable sugar trade on Hispaniola, and rejuvenate France's New World empire, Napoleon sent an army under the command of his brother-in-law General Charles Leclerc to Saint-Domingue to seize control after a slave revolt. The historian J. R. McNeill asserts that yellow fever inflicted between 35,000 and 45,000 casualties on French army, which was forced to withdraw, with only one-third surviving to return to France. Consequently, Napoleon abandoned his plans for North America and sold Louisiana to the US in 1803. In 1804, Haiti proclaimed its independence as the second republic in the Western Hemisphere. Considerable debate exists over whether the number of deaths caused by disease in the Haitian Revolution was exaggerated.

Although yellow fever is most prevalent in tropical-like climates, the northern United States was not exempt from the fever. The first outbreak in English-speaking North America occurred in New York City in 1668. English colonists in Philadelphia and the French in the Mississippi River Valley recorded major outbreaks in 1669, as well as additional yellow fever epidemics in Philadelphia, Baltimore, and New York City in the 18th and 19th centuries. The disease traveled along steamboat routes from New Orleans, causing some 100,000–150,000 deaths in total. The Yellow Fever Epidemic of 1793 in Philadelphia, which was then the capital of the United States, caused thousands of deaths totaling over 9% of the city's population, including James Hutchinson, a physician helping to treat the population of the city. As the outbreak escalated organs of the federal government fled piecemeal to the city to Trenton, New Jersey, eventually being joined by President George Washington. This was done with little coordination or formal sanction and at times was carried out in great haste. All entities of the federal government including Congress and President soon returned to resume operations in Philadelphia as the epidemic subsided. However, another severe outbreak in 1799 culminated in an official decision to relocate the national government to the city of Trenton, where it remained for the next six months.

The southern city of New Orleans was plagued with major epidemics during the 19th century, most notably in 1833 and 1853. A major epidemic occurred in both New Orleans and Shreveport, Louisiana, in 1873. Its residents called the disease "yellow jack". Urban epidemics continued in the United States until 1905, with the last outbreak affecting New Orleans.

At least 25 major outbreaks took place in the Americas during the 18th and 19th centuries, including particularly serious ones in Cartagena, Chile, in 1741; Cuba in 1762 and 1900; Santo Domingo in 1803; and Memphis, Tennessee, in 1878.

In the early 19th century, the prevalence of yellow fever in the Caribbean "led to serious health problems" and alarmed the United States Navy as numerous deaths and sickness curtailed naval operations and destroyed morale. One episode began in April 1822 when the frigate USS Macedonian left Boston and became part of Commodore James Biddle's West India Squadron. Unbeknownst to all, they were about to embark on an assignment that "would prove a cruise through hell". Secretary of the Navy Smith Thompson had assigned the squadron to guard American merchant shipping and suppress piracy. From 26 May to 3 August 1822, 76 of the Macedonian's officers and men died, including John Cadle, surgeon USN. 74 of these deaths were attributed to yellow fever. Biddle reported that another 52 of his crew were on the sick list. In their report to the secretary of the Navy, Biddle and Surgeon's Mate Charles Chase stated the cause as "fever". As a consequence of this loss, Biddle noted that his squadron was forced to return to Norfolk Navy Yard early. Upon arrival, the Macedonian's crew were provided medical care and quarantined at Craney Island, Virginia.

In 1853, Cloutierville, Louisiana, had a late-summer outbreak of yellow fever that quickly killed 68 of the 91 inhabitants. A local doctor concluded that some unspecified infectious agent had arrived in a package from New Orleans. In 1854, 650 residents of Savannah, Georgia, died from yellow fever. In 1858, St. Matthew's German Evangelical Lutheran Church in Charleston, South Carolina, had 308 yellow fever deaths, reducing the congregation by half. A ship carrying persons infected with the virus arrived in Hampton Roads in southeastern Virginia in June 1855. The disease spread quickly through the community, eventually killing over 3,000 people, mostly residents of Norfolk and Portsmouth. In 1873, Shreveport lost 759 citizens in an 80-day period to a yellow fever epidemic that began in August, by November over 400 additional victims succumbed for a total death toll of approximately 1,200.

The widespread Lower Mississippi Valley yellow fever epidemic of 1878 caused an estimated 20,000 fatalities. That year, Memphis had an unusually large amount of rain, which led to an increase in the mosquito population. The result was a huge epidemic of yellow fever. The steamship John D. Porter took people fleeing Memphis northward in hopes of escaping the disease, but passengers were not allowed to disembark due to concerns of spreading yellow fever. The ship roamed the Mississippi River for the next two months before unloading her passengers.

Major outbreaks have also occurred in southern Europe. Gibraltar lost many lives to outbreaks in 1804, 1814, and 1828. Barcelona suffered the loss of several thousand citizens during an outbreak in 1821. The Duke de Richelieu deployed 30,000 French troops to the border between France and Spain in the Pyrenees Mountains, to establish a cordon sanitaire to prevent the epidemic from spreading from Spain into France.

=== Causes and transmission ===
Ezekiel Stone Wiggins, known as the Ottawa Prophet, proposed that the cause of a yellow fever epidemic in Jacksonville, Florida, in 1888, was astrological.

The planets were in the same line as the sun and earth and this produced, besides Cyclones, Earthquakes, etc., a denser atmosphere holding more carbon and creating microbes. Mars had an uncommonly dense atmosphere, but its inhabitants were probably protected from the fever by their newly discovered canals, which were perhaps made to absorb carbon and prevent the disease.

In 1848, Josiah C. Nott suggested that yellow fever was spread by insects such as moths or mosquitoes, basing his ideas on the pattern of transmission of the disease. Carlos Finlay, a Cuban-Spanish doctor and scientist, proposed in 1881 that yellow fever might be transmitted by previously infected mosquitoes rather than by direct contact from person to person, as had long been believed. Since the losses from yellow fever in the Spanish–American War in the 1890s were extremely high, U.S. Army doctors began research experiments with a team led by Walter Reed, and composed of doctors James Carroll, Aristides Agramonte, and Jesse William Lazear. They successfully proved Finlay's "mosquito hypothesis". Yellow fever was the first virus shown to be transmitted by mosquitoes. The physician William Gorgas applied these insights and eradicated yellow fever from Havana. He also campaigned against yellow fever during the construction of the Panama Canal. A previous effort of canal building by the French had failed in part due to mortality from the high incidence of yellow fever and malaria, which killed many workers.

Although Reed has received much of the credit in United States history books for "beating" yellow fever, he had fully credited Finlay with the discovery of the yellow fever vector, and how it might be controlled. Reed often cited Finlay's papers in his articles and also credited him for the discovery in his correspondence. The acceptance of Finlay's work was one of the most important and far-reaching effects of the U.S. Army Yellow Fever Commission of 1900. Applying methods first suggested by Finlay, the United States government and Army eradicated yellow fever in Cuba and later in Panama, allowing completion of the Panama Canal. While Reed built on the research of Finlay, historian François Delaporte notes that yellow fever research was a contentious issue. Scientists, including Finlay and Reed, became successful by building on the work of less prominent scientists, without always giving them the credit they were due. Reed's research was essential in the fight against yellow fever. He is also credited for using the first type of medical consent form during his experiments in Cuba, an attempt to ensure that participants knew they were taking a risk by being part of testing.

Like Cuba and Panama, Brazil also led a highly successful sanitation campaign against mosquitoes and yellow fever. Beginning in 1903, the campaign led by Oswaldo Cruz, then director general of public health, resulted not only in eradicating the disease but also in reshaping the physical landscape of Brazilian cities such as Rio de Janeiro. During rainy seasons, Rio de Janeiro regularly suffered floods, as water from the bay surrounding the city overflowed into Rio's narrow streets. Coupled with the poor drainage systems found throughout Rio, this created swampy conditions in the city's neighborhoods. Pools of stagnant water stood year-long in city streets and proved to be fertile ground for disease-carrying mosquitoes. Thus, under Cruz's direction, public health units known as "mosquito inspectors" fiercely worked to combat yellow fever throughout Rio by spraying, exterminating rats, improving drainage, and destroying unsanitary housing. Ultimately, the city's sanitation and renovation campaigns reshaped Rio de Janeiro's neighborhoods. Its poor residents were pushed from city centers to Rio's suburbs, or to towns found in the outskirts of the city. In later years, Rio's most impoverished inhabitants would come to reside in favelas.

During 1920–1923, the Rockefeller Foundation's International Health Board undertook an expensive and successful yellow fever eradication campaign in Mexico. The IHB gained the respect of Mexico's federal government because of the success. The eradication of yellow fever strengthened the relationship between the US and Mexico, which had not been very good in the years prior. The eradication of yellow fever was also a major step toward better global health.

In 1927, scientists isolated the Yellow fever virus in West Africa. Following this, two vaccines were developed in the 1930s. Max Theiler led the completion of the 17D yellow fever vaccine in 1937, for which he was subsequently awarded the Nobel Prize in Physiology or Medicine. That vaccine, 17D, is still in use, although newer vaccines, based on vero cells, are in development (as of 2018).

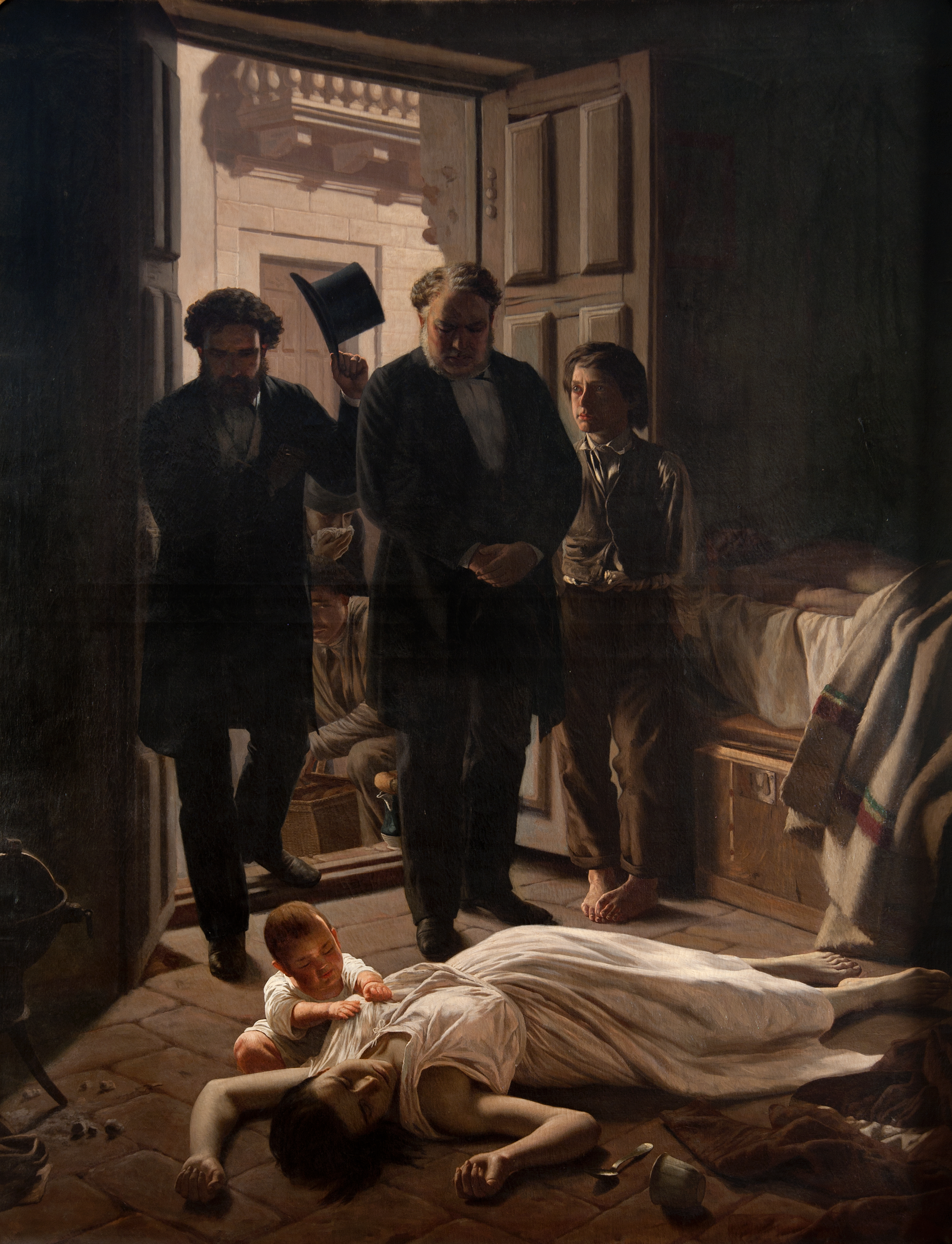
A painting by Juan Manuel Blanes depicting yellow fever in Buenos Aires, 1871

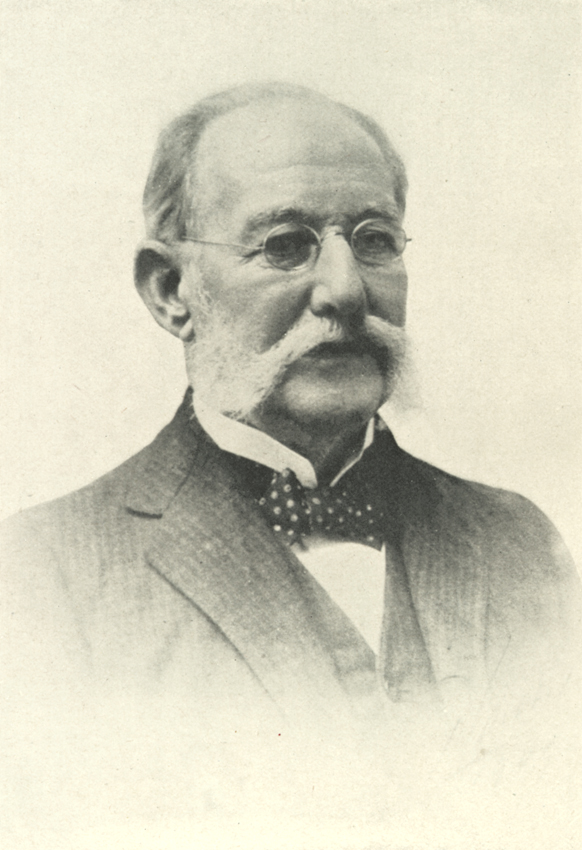
Carlos Finlay

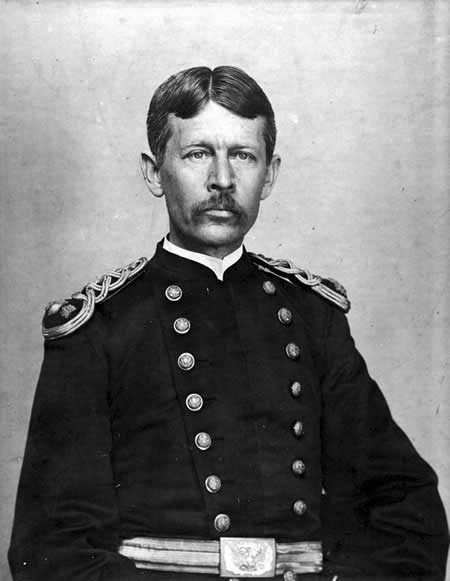
Walter Reed

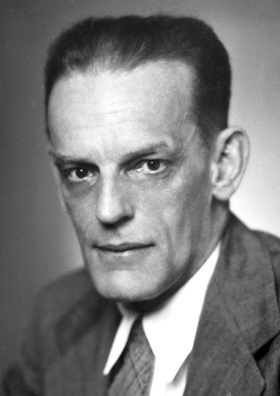
Max Theiler

=== Current status ===
Using vector control and strict vaccination programs, the urban cycle of yellow fever was nearly eradicated from South America. Since 1943, only a single urban outbreak in Santa Cruz de la Sierra, Bolivia, has occurred. Since the 1980s, however, the number of yellow fever cases has been increasing again, and A. aegypti has returned to the urban centers of South America. This is partly due to limitations on available insecticides, as well as habitat dislocations caused by climate change. It is also because the vector control program was abandoned. Although no new urban cycle has yet been established, scientists believe this could happen again at any point. An outbreak in Paraguay in 2008 was thought to be urban in nature, but this ultimately proved not to be the case.

In Africa, virus eradication programs have mostly relied upon vaccination. These programs have largely been unsuccessful because they were unable to break the sylvatic cycle involving wild primates. With few countries establishing regular vaccination programs, measures to fight yellow fever have been neglected, making the future spread of the virus more likely.

== Research ==
In the hamster model of yellow fever, early administration of the antiviral ribavirin is an effective treatment of many pathological features of the disease. Ribavirin treatment during the first five days after virus infection improved survival rates, reduced tissue damage in the liver and spleen, prevented hepatocellular steatosis, and normalised levels of alanine aminotransferase, a liver damage marker. The mechanism of action of ribavirin in reducing liver pathology in Yellow fever virus infection may be similar to its activity in the treatment of hepatitis C, a related virus. Because ribavirin had failed to improve survival in a virulent rhesus model of yellow fever infection, it had been previously discounted as a possible therapy. Infection was reduced in mosquitoes with the wMel strain of Wolbachia.

Yellow fever has been researched by several countries as a potential biological weapon.
