= Gabriel Hanotaux =

French statesman and historian (1853–1944)

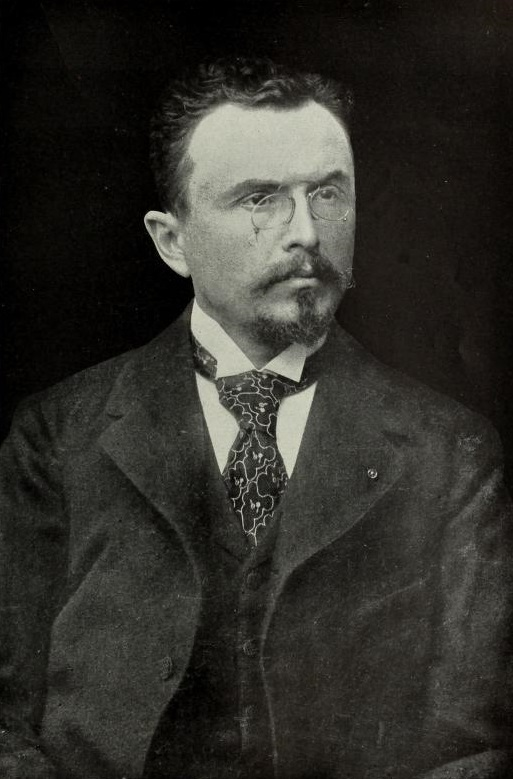
- Portrait of Gabriel Hanotaux
- Born: 19 November 1853; Beaurevoir, France
- Died: 11 April 1944 (aged 90); Paris, France
- Occupation: Historian

Albert Auguste Gabriel Hanotaux, known as Gabriel Hanotaux (19 November 1853 – 11 April 1944) was a French statesman and historian who was France's Minister of Foreign Affairs from 1894 to 1895 and 1896 to 1898.

== Biography ==
He was born at Beaurevoir in the département of Aisne. He studied history at the École des Chartes, and became maître de conférence in the École des Hautes Études. His political career was that of a civil servant rather than a party politician. In 1879 he entered the ministry of foreign affairs as a secretary, and rose gradually through the diplomatic service.

In 1886, he was elected deputy for Aisne, but, defeated in 1889, he returned to his diplomatic career, and on 31 May 1894 accepted the offer of Charles Dupuy to be minister of foreign affairs. With one interruption (from 28 October 1895 to 29 April 1896, during the ministry of Leon Bourgeois) he held this portfolio until 14 June 1898. During his ministry he developed the rapprochement of France with Russia—visiting Saint Petersburg with the president, Félix Faure—and sought to delimit the French colonies in Africa through agreements with the British. The Fashoda Incident of July 1898 was the most notable result of this policy. This seems to have intensified Hanotaux's distrust of England, which is apparent in his literary works (though most of these were written after he had left the Quai d'Orsay).

Hanotaux was elected a member of the Académie française on 1 April 1897. He served as a delegate for France with the League of Nations and participated in the 1st (15 November – 18 December 1920), 2nd (5 September – 5 October 1921), 3rd (4–30 September 1922) and 4th Assemblies (3–29 September 1923). In the early 1920s, there were proposals for the League of Nations to accept Esperanto as a working language. Ten delegates accepted the proposals with only one voice against, the French delegate, Gabriel Hanotaux. The French employed their veto as a member of the League Council on all such votes, starting with the vote on 18 December 1920. Hanotaux did not like how the French language was losing its position as the international language of diplomacy and saw Esperanto as a threat.

Gabriel Hanotaux died in Paris in 1944 and was interred in the Passy Cemetery. His home in Orchaise now serves as a botanical garden, the Parc botanique du Prieuré d'Orchaise.

== Works ==
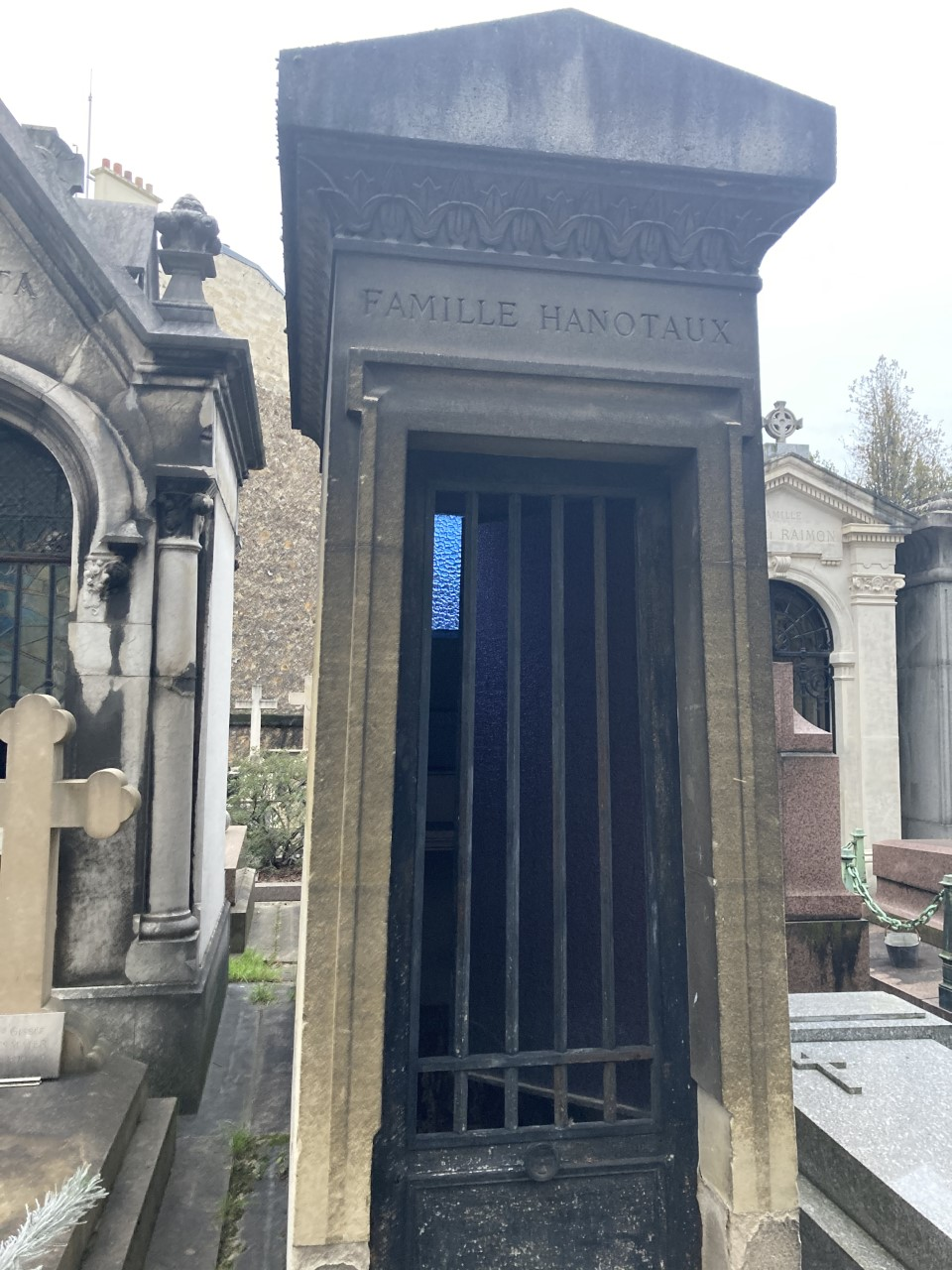
Grave of Hanotaux

- Les Villes retrouvées (1881)
- Origines de l'institution des intendants des provinces, d'après les documents inédits (1884)
- Henri Martin, sa vie, ses œuvres, son temps, 1810-1883, Librairie Léopold Cerf, Paris, 1885, VII-340 p., BnF 30574646m. Consultable en ligne et téléchargeable sur Internet Archive.
- Études historiques sur le XVIe et le XVIIe en France (1886)
- Recueil des instructions données aux ambassadeurs et ministres de France : depuis les traités de Westphalie jusqu'à la Révolution française (1888-1913)
- Essai sur les libertés de l'Église gallicane depuis les origines jusqu'au règne de Louis XIV (1888)
- Note sur la famille maternelle de Jean de La Fontaine (les Pidoux du Poitou et de l'Île-de-France) (1889)
- Paris en 1614 (1890)
- Histoire du cardinal de Richelieu (1893-1903)
- Les Hommes de 1889 (1893)
- L'Affaire de Madagascar (1896)
- Tableau de la France en 1614, la France et la royauté avant Richelieu (1898)
- La Seine et les quais, promenades d'un bibliophile (1901)
- Du Choix d'une carrière (1902)
- L'Énergie française (1902)
- Histoire de la France contemporaine, 1871-1900 (1903-1908) Vol. I : Le gouvernement de M. Thiers, Vol. II : La Présidence du Maréchal de Mac Mahon - L'échec de la Monarchie, Vol. III : La Présidence du Maréchal de Mac Mahon - La constitution de 1875 et Vol. IV : La République Parlementaire disponibles sur Internet Archive
- La Paix latine (1903)
- La jeunesse de Balzac. Balzac imprimeur 1825-1828, with Georges Vicaire Paris, A. Ferroud, 1903, 1re édition. Librairie des Amateurs, A. Ferroud, F. Ferroud, 1921. La partie « Balzac imprimeur » recense et décrit tous les livres imprimés par Balzac dans son imprimerie.
- Le Partage de l'Afrique : Fachoda (1909)
- La Démocratie et le Travail (Flammarion, Bibliothèque de philosophie scientifique, 1910)
- La Fleur des histoires françaises (1911)
- Jeanne d'Arc (1911)
- Une commémoration franco-américaine. Pour un grand français, Champlain (1912)
- Études diplomatiques. La Politique de l'équilibre, 1907-1911 (1912)
- Histoire de la nation française (1913)
- La France vivante. En Amérique du Nord (1913)
- Études diplomatiques. 2e série. La guerre des Balkans et l'Europe, 1912-1913 (1914)
- Les Villes martyres. Les falaises de l'Aisne (1915)
- Pendant la grande guerre, I (août-décembre 1914) : études diplomatiques et historiques (1916)
- L'Énigme de Charleroi (1917), l'Édition Française Illustrée, Paris
- L'Aisne pendant la Grande guerre (1919)
- Circuits des champs de bataille de France, histoire et itinéraires de la Grande guerre (1919)
- De l'histoire et des historiens (1919)
- Le Traité de Versailles du 28 juin 1919. L'Allemagne et l'Europe (1919)
- Joffre (avec le lieutenant-colonel Fabry) (1921)
- La Bataille de la Marne (1922)
- Georges Vicaire. 1853-1921 (1922)
- Histoire illustrée de la guerre de 1914, with illustrations by Auguste-Louis Lepère - Texte intégral (1924)
- Bibliophiles (1924)
- Le Général Mangin (1925)
- La Renaissance provençale. La Provence niçoise (1928)
- Préface des Mémoires of Auguste Gérard, Plon, Paris (1928)
- Histoire des colonies françaises et de l'expansion de la France dans le monde (1929-1934), with Alfred Martineau (Volume II Algérie available online)
- Le Maréchal Foch ou l'homme de guerre (1929)
- Regards sur l'Égypte et la Palestine (1929)
- En Belgique par les pays dévastés (1931)
- Histoire de la nation égyptienne (1931-1940)
- L'Art religieux ancien dans le comté de Nice et en Provence (1932)
- À propos de l'histoire (with Paul Valéry) (1933)
- Mon temps (1935-1947)
- Pour l'Empire colonial français (1935)
- Raymond Poincaré (1935)

Four volumes of his memoir, Mon Temps were published between 1933 and 1947.

He edited the Instructions des ambassadeurs de France à Rome, depuis les traités de Westphalie (1888).

== Notes ==
Political offices
Preceded by Jean Casimir-Perier	Minister of Foreign Affairs; 1894–1895	Succeeded by Marcelin Berthelot
Preceded by Léon Bourgeois	Minister of Foreign Affairs; 1896–1898	Succeeded by Théophile Delcassé
Preceded by André Lebon	interim Minister of Colonies; 1898	Succeeded by Georges Trouillot
