= André Billy (writer) =

French writer

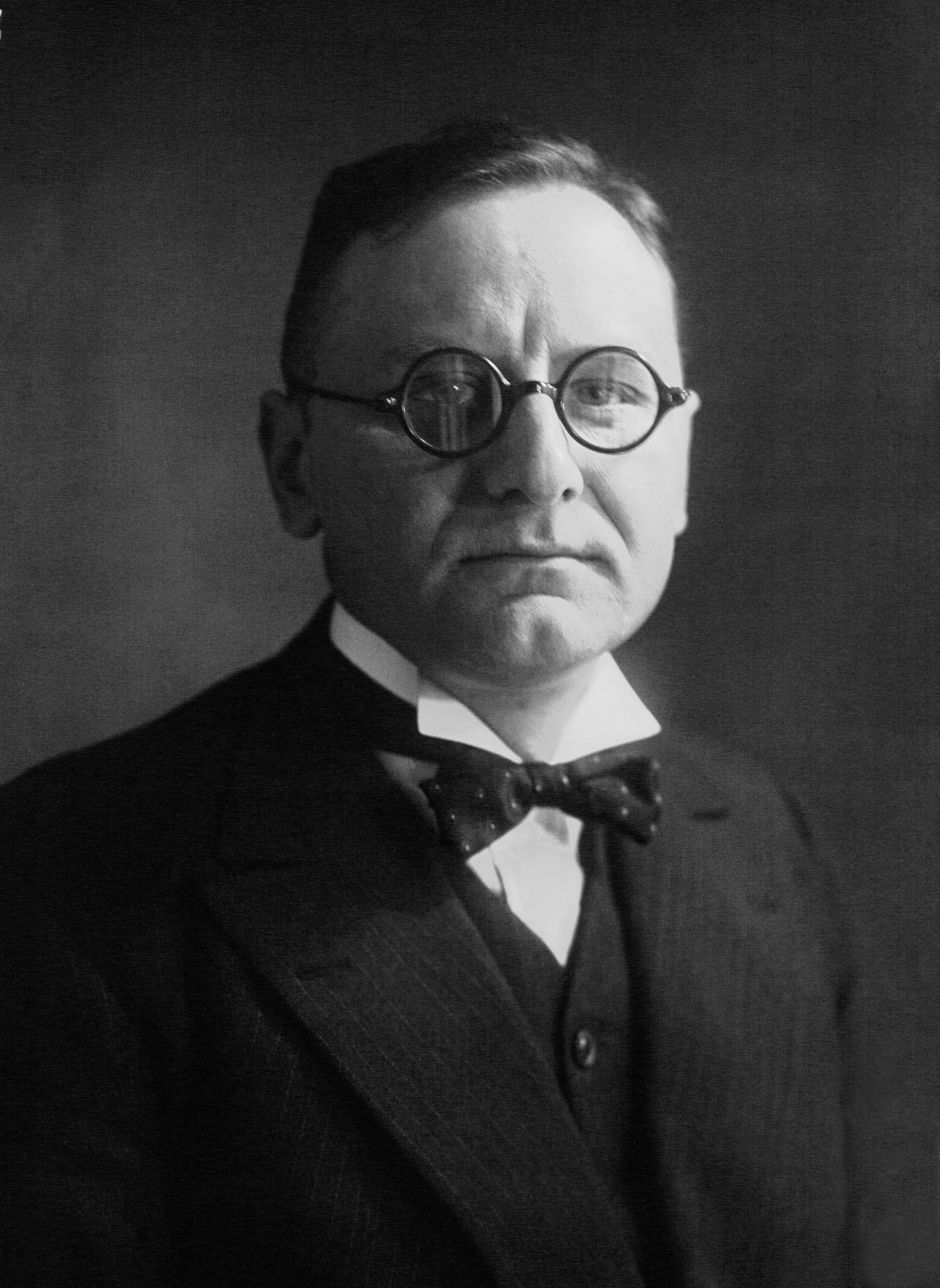
André Billy in 1923

André Billy (13 December 1882 – 11 April 1971) was a French writer.

He was born in Saint-Quentin, Aisne. After completing secondary studies at the Collège de la Providence in Amiens, he studied under the Jesuits at Saint-Dizier. He began writing in 1907, occasionally using the pseudonym Jean de l'Escritoire.

Billy used ecclesiastical settings for the novels Bénoni, L'Approbaniste, Introïbo, and Le Narthex. He was inspired by the story-tellers of the 18th century for La Femme maquillée, L'Amie des hommes, Quel homme es-tu? and the essay Pudeur. For many years he was the literary critic for L'Œuvre. He edited the collection Leurs Raisons.

Billy became honorary president of the Société des amis de Philéas Lebesgue. Retiring to Lyon during the Occupation of France, he worked on a series of imposing biographies: Vie de Balzac, Vie de Diderot, and Vie de Sainte-Beuve. He was elected to the Académie Goncourt in 1943, but could not take his seat until 1944 because of the hostility of several members, some of whom he had criticised in his writings. After the War, he wrote the Chroniques du samedi for Le Figaro littéraire. The collection Histoire de la vie littéraire (éditions Tallandier) was published under the direction of André Billy, who contributed L'Époque 1900. In total, during his career he was to write 11,000 articles for over one hundred European newspapers.

André Billy won the Prix des Ambassadeurs in 1952 for his essay on Sainte-Beuve. In 1954, he became a laureate of the Grand prix national des Lettres. He was a friend of Guillaume Apollinaire and Paul Léautaud. He died in Fontainebleau.

== Works ==
- Benoni, mœurs d'église, novel, Sansol, Paris, 1907.
- La Dérive, novel, Louis-Michaud, Paris, 1909.
- La Malabée, illustrated by Jean Émile Laboureur, Société littéraire de France, Paris, 1917.
- Barabour ou l'harmonie universelle, novel, La renaissance du livre, Paris, 1920.
- Écrit en Songe, illustrated by Laboureur, Société littéraire de France, Paris, 1920.
- D'Homme à homme, short story, les œuvres libres 14, août 1922, fayard, Paris, 1922.
- L'Ange qui pleure, novel, Éditions de la Nouvelle Revue Critique, Paris, 1925.
- La Trentaine, novel, Messein, Paris, 1925.
- L'Epopée de Ménache Foïgel (Le Fléau du savoir, Comme Dieu en France, Le Lion, l'Ours et le Serpent), with Moïse Twersky, 3 volumes, Plon, Paris, 1927–1928.
- La Littérature française contemporaine, Colin, Paris, 1927.
- Banlieue sentimentale, novel, Crès, Paris, 1929.
- La Femme maquillée, novel, Flammarion, Paris, 1932.
- Princesse folle, novel, Flammarion, Paris, 1933.
- L'Amie des hommes, novel, Flammarion, Paris, 1935.
- Quel homme es-tu? novel, Flammarion, Paris, 1936.
- L'Approbaniste, novel, Flammarion, Paris, 1937.
- Nathalie ou les enfants de la terre, novel, Flammarion, Paris, 1938.
- Introibo, novel, Flammarion, Paris, 1939.
- Le Double Assassinat de la maison du bœuf, short stories, Éditions du milieu du monde, Genève, 1941.
- Pauline, novel, Flammarion, Paris, 1941.
- L'Herbe à pauvre homme, novella, Flammarion, Paris, 1942.
- Le Duc des halles, Édouard Aubanel, Avignon, 1943.
- Métro Marboeuf, novel, Intercontinentale Édition, Monaco, 1945.
- Le Six, novel, Flammarion, Paris, 1946.
- Malvina ou le Bataillon de Napoléon II, novel, Éditions de la Table Ronde, Paris, 1946.
- Le Narthex, novel, Flammarion, Paris, 1949.
- L'Allegretto de la Septième novel, 1960.
- Du noir sur du blanc, novel, 1963.
- Stanislas de Guaita, biography, Mercure de France, 1971.

Memoirs

- La Terrasse du Luxembourg, 1945
- Le Pont des Saints-Pères, 1947
- Le Balcon au bord de l'eau
- Les Beaux Jours de Barbizon
- Le Badaud de Paris et d'ailleurs, 1959
- Sur les bords de la Veule, 1965

== Bibliography ==
- Lucien Mazenod, Les Écrivains célèbres, éditions d'Art
