= Yellow fever vaccine =

Vaccine that protects against yellow fever

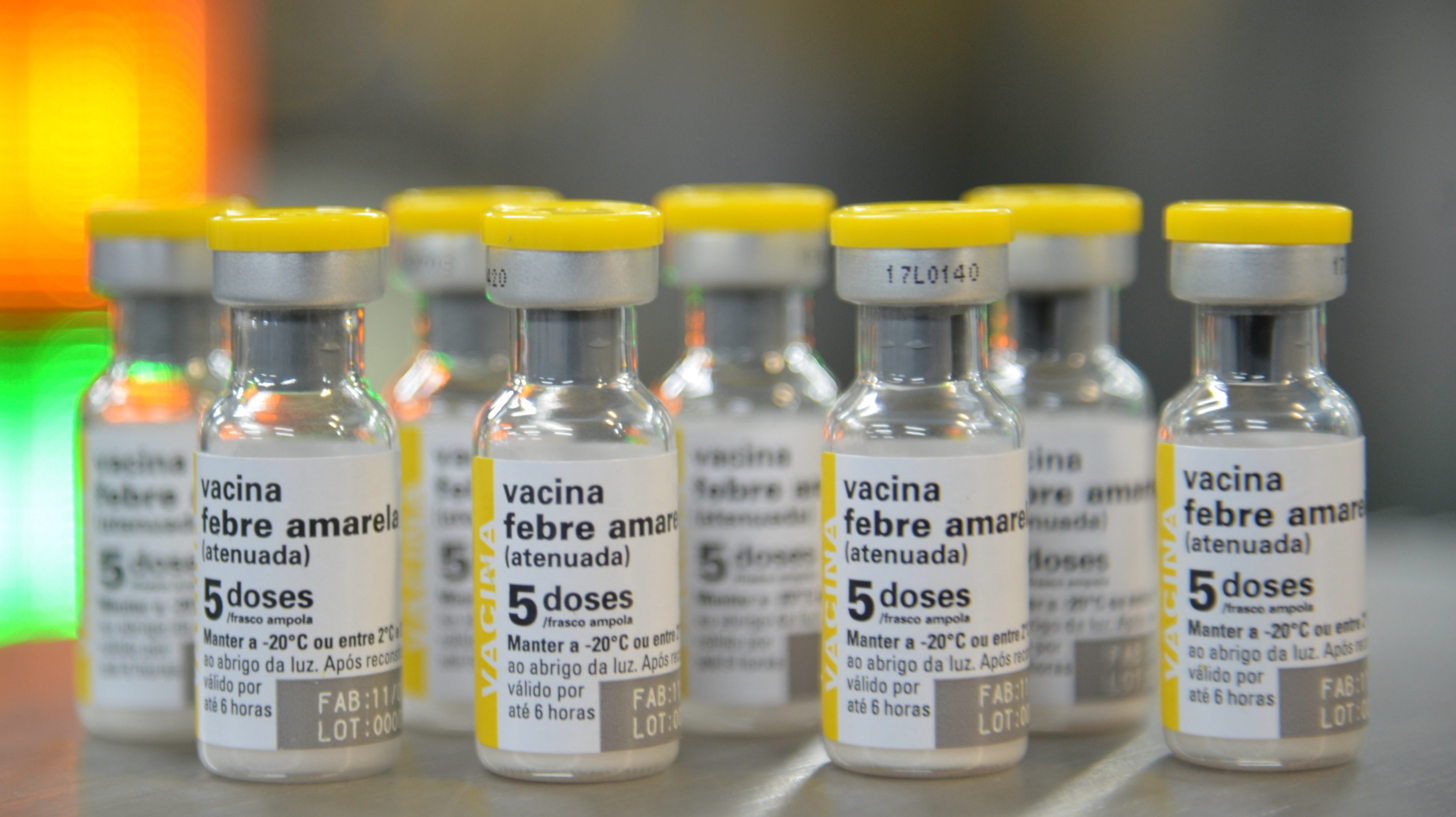
- Yellow fever vaccine vials (Brazil)

Vaccine description
- Target: Yellow fever
- Vaccine type: Attenuated

Clinical data
- Trade names: YF-Vax, Stamaril
- Other names: 17D vaccine
- AHFS/Drugs.com: Monograph
- MedlinePlus: a607030
- Pregnancy category: AU: B2
- Routes of administration: Subcutaneous
- ATC code: J07BL (WHO)

Legal status
- Legal status: UK: POM (Prescription only); US: ℞-only

Identifiers
- ChemSpider: none
- UNII: PY4EET359T

Yellow fever vaccine is a vaccine that protects against yellow fever. Yellow fever is a viral infection that occurs in Africa and South America. Most people begin to develop immunity within ten days of vaccination and are 99% protected within one month, and this appears to be lifelong. The vaccine can be used to control outbreaks of disease. It is given either by injection into a muscle or just under the skin.

The World Health Organization (WHO) recommends routine immunization in all countries where the disease is common. This should typically occur between nine and twelve months of age. Those traveling to areas where the disease occurs should also be immunized. Additional doses after the first are generally not needed.

The yellow fever vaccine is generally safe. This includes in those with HIV infection but without symptoms. Mild side effects may include headache, muscle pains, pain at the injection site, fever, and rash. Severe allergies occur in about eight per million doses, serious neurological problems occur in about four per million doses, and organ failure occurs in about three per million doses. It appears to be safe in pregnancy and is therefore recommended among those who will be potentially exposed. It should not be given to those with very poor immune function.

The first yellow fever vaccine was developed by the French scientist Jean Laigret in 1932. It is on the World Health Organization's List of Essential Medicines. The vaccine is made from weakened yellow fever virus. Some countries require a yellow fever vaccination certificate before entry from a country where the disease is common.

== Medical uses ==
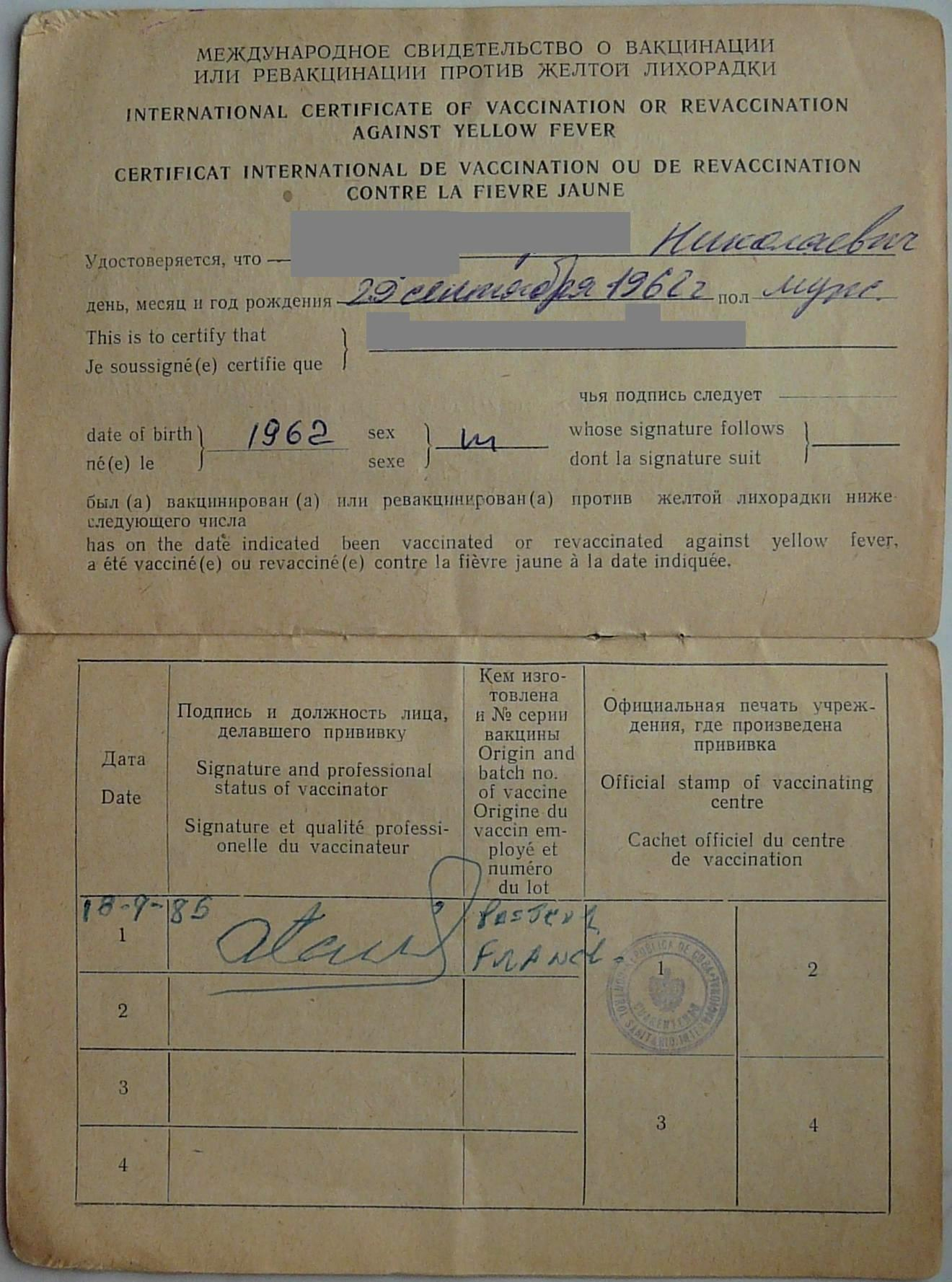
A yellow fever vaccination certificate issued by the Soviet Union

=== Targeting ===
Medical experts recommend vaccinating people most at risk of contracting the virus, such as woodcutters working in tropical areas. Insecticides, protective clothing, and screening of houses are helpful, but not always sufficient for mosquito control; medical experts recommend using personal insecticide spray in endemic areas. In affected areas, mosquito control methods have proven effective in decreasing the number of cases.

Travellers need to have the vaccine ten days before being in an endemic area to ensure full immunity.

=== Duration and effectiveness ===
For most people, the vaccine remains effective permanently. People who are HIV positive at vaccination can benefit from a booster after ten years.

On 17 May 2013, the World Health Organization (WHO) Strategic Advisory Group of Experts on immunization (SAGE) announced that a booster dose of yellow fever (YF) vaccine, ten years after a primary dose, is not necessary. Since yellow fever vaccination began in the 1930s, only 12 known cases of yellow fever post-vaccination have been identified after 600 million doses have been dispensed. Evidence showed that among this small number of "vaccine failures", all cases developed the disease within five years of vaccination. This demonstrates that immunity does not decrease with time.

=== Schedule ===
The World Health Organization recommends the vaccine between the ages of 9 and 12 months in areas where the disease is common. Anyone over the age of nine months who has not been previously immunized and either lives in or is traveling to an area where the disease occurs should also be immunized.

== Side effects ==
The yellow fever 17D vaccine is considered safe, with over 500 million doses given and very few documented cases of vaccine-associated illness (62 confirmed cases and 35 deaths as of January 2019). In no case of vaccine-related illness has there been evidence of the virus reverting to a virulent phenotype.

The majority of adverse reactions to the 17D vaccine result from allergic reactions to the eggs in which the vaccine is grown. Persons with known egg allergy should discuss this with their physician before vaccination. In addition, there is a small risk of neurologic disease and encephalitis, particularly in individuals with compromised immune systems and very young children. The 17D vaccine is contraindicated in (among others) infants between zero and six months, people with thymus disorders associated with abnormal immune cell function, people with primary immunodeficiencies, and anyone with a diminished immune capacity including those taking immunosuppressant drugs.

There is a small risk of more severe yellow fever-like disease associated with the vaccine. This reaction, known as yellow fever vaccine-associated acute viscerotropic disease (YEL-AVD), causes a fairly severe disease closely resembling yellow fever caused by virulent strains of the virus. The risk factors for YEL-AVD are not known, although it has been suggested that it may be genetic. The 2'-5'-oligoadenylate synthase (OAS) component of the innate immune response is particularly important in protection from Flavivirus infection. Another reaction to the yellow fever vaccine is known as yellow fever vaccine-associated acute neurotropic disease (YEL-AND).

The Canadian Medical Association published a 2001 CMAJ article entitled "Yellow fever vaccination: be sure the patient needs it". The article begins by stating that of the seven people who developed system failure within two to five days of the vaccine in 1996–2001, six died "including 2 who were vaccinated even though they were planning to travel to countries where yellow fever has never been reported." The article cites that "3 demonstrated histopatholic changes consistent with wild yellow fever virus." The author recommends vaccination for only non-contraindicated travelers (see the articles list) and those travelers going where yellow fever activity is reported or in the endemic zone which can be found mapped at the CDC website cited below. In addition, the 2010 online edition of the Center for Disease Control Traveler's Health Yellow Book states that between 1970 and 2002 only "nine cases of yellow fever were reported in unvaccinated travelers from the United States and Europe who traveled" to West Africa and South America, and 8 of the 9 died. However, it goes on to cite "only 1 documented case of yellow fever in a vaccinated traveler. This nonfatal case occurred in a traveler from Spain who visited several West African countries in 1988".

== History ==
African tropical cultures had adopted burial traditions in which the deceased were buried near their habitation, including those who died of yellow fever. This ensured that people within these cultures gained immunity through a childhood case of "endemic" yellow fever through acquired immunity. This led to a lasting misperception, first by colonial authorities and foreign medical experts, that Africans have a "natural immunity" to the illness. In the nineteenth century health provisioners forced the abandonment of these traditional burial traditions, leading to local populations dying of yellow fever as frequently as those without such burial customs such as settler populations.

The first modern attempts to develop a yellow fever vaccine followed the opening of the Panama Canal in 1912, which increased global exposure to the disease. The Japanese bacteriologist Hideyo Noguchi led investigations for the Rockefeller Foundation in Ecuador that resulted in a vaccine based on his theory that the disease was caused by a leptospiral bacterium. However, other investigators could not duplicate his results and the ineffective vaccine was eventually abandoned.

Another vaccine was developed from the "French strain" of the virus, obtained by Pasteur Institute scientists from a man in Dakar, Senegal, who survived his bout with the disease. This vaccine could be administered by scarification, like the smallpox vaccine, and was given in combination to produce immunity to both diseases, but it also had severe systemic and neurologic complications in a few cases. Attempts to attenuate the virus used in the vaccine failed. Scientists at the Rockefeller Foundation developed another vaccine derived from the serum of an African named Asibi in 1927, the first isolation of the virus from a human. It was safer but involved the use of large amounts of human serum, which limited widespread use. Both vaccines were in use for several years, the Rockefeller vaccine in the Western hemisphere and England, and the Pasteur Institute vaccine in France and its African colonies.

In 1932 the French scientist Jean Laigret became head of the laboratory at the Pasteur Institute of Tunis. Here he conducted tests on the first vaccine against yellow fever, using a vaccine produced from the brains of mice that were infected with the yellow fever virus. In 1934, while based in Dakar, he administered the yellow fever vaccine to the populace on a large-scale basis. The vaccine used in West Africa was deemed successful; its primary negative being reports of benign febrile reactions.

In 1937, Max Theiler, working with Hugh Smith and Eugen Haagen at the Rockefeller Foundation to improve the vaccine from the "Asibi" strain, discovered that a favorable chance mutation in the attenuated virus had produced a highly effective strain that was named 17D. Following the work of Ernest Goodpasture, Theiler used chicken eggs to culture the virus. After field trials in Brazil, over one million people were vaccinated by 1939, without severe complications. This vaccine was widely used by the U.S. Army during World War II. For his work on the yellow fever vaccine, Theiler received the 1951 Nobel Prize in Physiology or Medicine. Only the 17D vaccine remains in use today.

Theiler's vaccine was responsible for the largest outbreak of hepatitis B in history, infecting 330,000 soldiers and giving 50,000 jaundice between 1941 and 1942. At the time, chronic infectious hepatitis was not known, so when human serum was used in vaccine preparation, serum drawn from chronic hepatitis B virus (HBV) carriers contaminated the yellow fever vaccine. In 1941, researchers at Rocky Mountain Laboratories developed a safer alternative, an "aqueous-base" version of the 17D vaccine using distilled water combined with the virus grown in chicken eggs. Since 1971, screening technology for HBV has been available and is routinely used in situations where HBV contamination is possible including vaccine preparation.

Also in the 1930s, a French team developed the French neurotropic vaccine (FNV), which was extracted from mouse brain tissue. Since this vaccine was associated with a higher incidence of encephalitis, FNV was not recommended after 1961. Vaccine 17D is still in use, and more than 400 million doses have been distributed. Little research has been done to develop new vaccines. Newer vaccines, based on vero cells, are in development (as of 2018).

== Manufacture and global supply ==
Increases in cases of yellow fever in endemic areas of Africa and South America in the 1980s were addressed by the WHO Yellow Fever Initiative launched in the mid-2000s. The initiative was supported by the Gavi Alliance, a collaboration of the WHO, UNICEF, vaccine manufacturers, and private philanthropists such as the Bill & Melinda Gates Foundation. Gavi-supported vaccination campaigns since 2011 have covered 88 million people in 14 countries considered at "high-risk" of a yellow fever outbreak (Angola was considered "medium risk"). As of 2013, there were four WHO-qualified manufacturers: Bio-Manguinhos in Brazil (with the Oswaldo Cruz Foundation), Institute Pasteur in Dakar, Senegal, the Federal State Unitary Enterprise of Chumakov Institute in Russia, and Sanofi Pasteur, the French pharmaceutical company. Two other manufacturers supply domestic markets: Wuhan Institute of Biological Products in China and Sanofi Pasteur in the United States.

Demand for yellow fever vaccine for preventive campaigns has increased from about five million doses per year to a projected 62 million per year by 2014. UNICEF reported in 2013 that supplies were insufficient. Manufacturers are producing about 35 million of the 64 million doses needed per year. Demand for the yellow fever vaccine has continued to increase due to the growing number of countries implementing yellow fever vaccination as part of their routine immunization programmes.

The outbreak of yellow fever in Angola and the Democratic Republic of Congo in 2016 has raised concerns about whether the global supply of the vaccine is adequate to meet the need during a large epidemic or pandemic of the disease. Routine childhood immunization was suspended in other African countries to ensure an adequate supply in the vaccination campaign against the outbreak in Angola. Emergency stockpiles of vaccine diverted to Angola, which consisted of about 10 million doses at the end of March 2016, had become exhausted, but were being replenished by May 2016. However, in August it was reported that about one million doses of six million shipped in February had been sent to the wrong place or not kept cold enough to ensure efficacy, resulting in shortages to fight the spreading epidemic in DR Congo. As an emergency measure, experts suggested fractional dose vaccination, using a fractional dose (one-fifth or one-tenth of the usual dose) to extend existing supplies of vaccine. Others have noted that switching manufacturing processes to modern cell-culture technology might improve vaccine supply shortfalls, as the manufacture of the current vaccine in chicken eggs is slow and laborious. On 17 June 2016, the WHO agreed to the use of one-fifth the usual dose as an emergency measure during the ongoing outbreak in Angola and the DR Congo. The fractional dose would not qualify for a yellow fever certificate of vaccination for travelers. Later studies found that the fractional dose was just as protective as the full dose, even 10 years after vaccination.

As of February 2021, UNICEF reported awarded contract prices ranging from US$0.97 to US$1.444 per dose under multi-year contracts with various suppliers.

== Travel requirements ==
Risk countries (WHO designation) Partial risk countries (WHO designation)

Vaccination against yellow fever 10 days before entering this country/territory is required for travellers coming from... All countries Risk countries (including airport transfers) (Note: Also required for travellers having transited (more than 12 hours) through a risk country's airport.) Risk countries (excluding airport transfers) (Note: Not required for travellers having transited through a risk country's airport.) No requirement (risk country) (Note: The WHO has designated (parts of) Argentina, Brazil, and Peru as risk countries, but these countries do not require incoming travellers to vaccinate against yellow fever.) No requirement (non-risk country)

Travellers who wish to enter certain countries or territories must be vaccinated against yellow fever 10 days before crossing the border, and be able to present a vaccination record/certificate at the border checks. In most cases, this travel requirement depends on whether the country they are travelling from has been designated by the World Health Organization as being a 'country with risk of yellow fever transmission'. In a few countries, it does not matter which country the traveller comes from: everyone who wants to enter these countries must be vaccinated against yellow fever. There are exemptions for newborn children; in most cases, any child who is at least 9 months or 1 year old needs to be vaccinated.

Yellow fever vaccination requirements for international travel (January 2023)
Country or territory	Status	Vaccination is required for travellers coming from	Traveller age
Albania	No risk	Risk countries	1 year or older
Algeria	No risk	Risk countries (Note: Also required for travellers having transited more than 12 hours through a risk country's airport.)	1 year or older
Angola	Risk country	All countries	9 months or older
Antigua and Barbuda	No risk	Risk countries	1 year or older
Argentina	Risk provinces: Misiones, Corrientes	No	–
Aruba	No risk	Risk countries	9 months or older
Australia	No risk	Risk countries	1 year or older
Bahamas	No risk	Risk countries	1 year or older
Bahrain	No risk	Risk countries	9 months or older
Bangladesh	No risk	Risk countries (Note: Also required for travellers having transited any time through a risk country's airport.)	1 year or older
Barbados	No risk	Risk countries	1 year or older
Benin	Risk country	All countries	1 year or older
Bolivia	Risk country	Risk countries	1 year or older
Bonaire	No risk	Risk countries	9 months or older
Botswana	No risk	Risk countries	1 year or older
Brazil	Risk country	No	–
Brunei	No risk	Risk countries	9 months or older
Burkina Faso	Risk country	All countries	9 months or older
Burundi	Risk country	All countries	9 months or older
Cabo Verde	No risk	Risk countries	1 year or older
Cambodia	No risk	Risk countries	1 year or older
Cameroon	Risk country	All countries	9 months or older
Central African Republic	Risk country	All countries	9 months or older
Chad	Risk country	Risk countries	9 months or older
China	No risk	Risk countries	9 months or older
Christmas Island	No risk	Risk countries	1 year or older
Colombia	Risk country	Risk countries	1 year or older
Congo-Brazzaville	Risk country	All countries	9 months or older
Congo-Kinshasa	Risk country	All countries	9 months or older
Costa Rica	No risk	Risk countries	9 months or older
Côte d'Ivoire	Risk country	All countries	9 months or older
Cuba	No risk	Risk countries	9 months or older
Curaçao	No risk	Risk countries	9 months or older
Djibouti	No risk	Risk countries	1 year or older
Dominica	No risk	Risk countries	1 year or older
Dominican Republic	No risk	Risk countries	1 year or older
Ecuador	Risk country	Risk countries	1 year or older
Egypt	No risk	Risk countries	9 months or older
El Salvador	No risk	Risk countries	1 year or older
Equatorial Guinea	Risk country	Risk countries	9 months or older
Eritrea	No risk	Risk countries	9 months or older
Eswatini	No risk	Risk countries	9 months or older
Ethiopia	Risk country	Risk countries	9 months or older
Fiji	No risk	Risk countries	1 year or older
French Guiana	Risk country	All countries	1 year or older
French Polynesia	No risk	Risk countries	9 months or older
Gabon	Risk country	All countries	1 year or older
Gambia	Risk country	Risk countries	9 months or older
Ghana	Risk country	All countries	9 months or older
Grenada	No risk	Risk countries	1 year or older
Guadeloupe	No risk	Risk countries	1 year or older
Guatemala	No risk	Risk countries	1 year or older
Guinea	Risk country	Risk countries	9 months or older
Guinea-Bissau	Risk country	All countries	1 year or older
Guyana	Risk country	Risk countries	1 year or older
Haiti	No risk	Risk countries	1 year or older
Honduras	No risk	Risk countries	1 year or older
India	No risk	Risk countries	9 months or older
Indonesia	No risk	Risk countries	9 months or older
Iran	No risk	Risk countries	9 months or older
Iraq	No risk	Risk countries	9 months or older
Jamaica	No risk	Risk countries	1 year or older
Jordan	No risk	Risk countries	1 year or older
Kenya	Risk country	Risk countries	1 year or older
Liberia	Risk country	Risk countries	9 months or older
Libya	No risk	Risk countries	1 year or older
Madagascar	No risk	Risk countries	9 months or older
Malawi	No risk	Risk countries	1 year or older
Malaysia	No risk	Risk countries	1 year or older
Maldives	No risk	Risk countries	9 months or older
Mali	Risk country	All countries	1 year or older
Malta	No risk	Risk countries	9 months or older
Martinique	No risk	Risk countries	1 year or older
Mauritania	Risk country	Risk countries	1 year or older
Mayotte	No risk	Risk countries	1 year or older
Montserrat	No risk	Risk countries	1 year or older
Mozambique	No risk	Risk countries	9 months or older
Myanmar	No risk	Risk countries	1 year or older
Namibia	No risk	Risk countries	9 months or older
Nepal	No risk	Risk countries	1 year or older
New Caledonia	No risk	Risk countries	1 year or older
Nicaragua	No risk	Risk countries	1 year or older
Niger	Risk country	All countries	1 year or older
Nigeria	Risk country	Risk countries	9 months or older
Niue	No risk	Risk countries	9 months or older
North Korea	No risk	Risk countries	1 year or older
Oman	No risk	Risk countries	9 months or older
Pakistan	No risk	Risk countries	1 year or older
Panama	Risk country	Risk countries	1 year or older
Papua New Guinea	No risk	Risk countries	1 year or older
Paraguay	Risk country	Risk countries	1 year or older
Peru	Risk country	No	–
Philippines	No risk	Risk countries	1 year or older
Pitcairn Islands	No risk	Risk countries	1 year or older
Qatar	No risk	Risk countries	9 months or older
Rwanda	No risk	Risk countries	1 year or older
Saint Barthélemy	No risk	Risk countries	1 year or older
Saint Helena	No risk	Risk countries	1 year or older
Saint Kitts and Nevis	No risk	Risk countries	1 year or older
Saint Lucia	No risk	Risk countries	9 months or older
Saint Martin	No risk	Risk countries	1 year or older
Saint Vincent and the Grenadines	No risk	Risk countries	1 year or older
Samoa	No risk	Risk countries	1 year or older
São Tomé and Príncipe	No risk	Risk countries	1 year or older
Saudi Arabia	No risk	Risk countries	9 months or older
Senegal	Risk country	Risk countries	9 months or older
Seychelles	No risk	Risk countries	1 year or older
Sierra Leone	Risk country	All countries	Unknown
Singapore	No risk	Risk countries	1 year or older
Sint Eustatius	No risk	Risk countries	6 months or older
Sint Maarten	No risk	Risk countries	9 months or older
Solomon Islands	No risk	Risk countries	9 months or older
South Africa	No risk	Risk countries	1 year or older
South Sudan	Risk country	All countries	9 months or older
Sri Lanka	No risk	Risk countries	9 months or older
Sudan	Risk provinces: South of Khartoum or Sahara Desert	No	–
Suriname	Risk country	Risk countries	1 year or older
Tanzania	No risk	Risk countries	1 year or older
Thailand	No risk	Risk countries	9 months or older
Togo	Risk country	All countries	9 months or older
Trinidad and Tobago	Risk region: Trinidad	Risk countries	1 year or older
Uganda	Risk country	All countries	1 year or older
United Arab Emirates	No risk	Risk countries	9 months or older
Venezuela	Risk country	Risk countries	1 year or older
Wallis and Futuna	No risk	Risk countries	1 year or older
Zambia	No risk	Risk countries	1 year or older
Zimbabwe	No risk	Risk countries	9 months or older
