= Philéas Lebesgue =

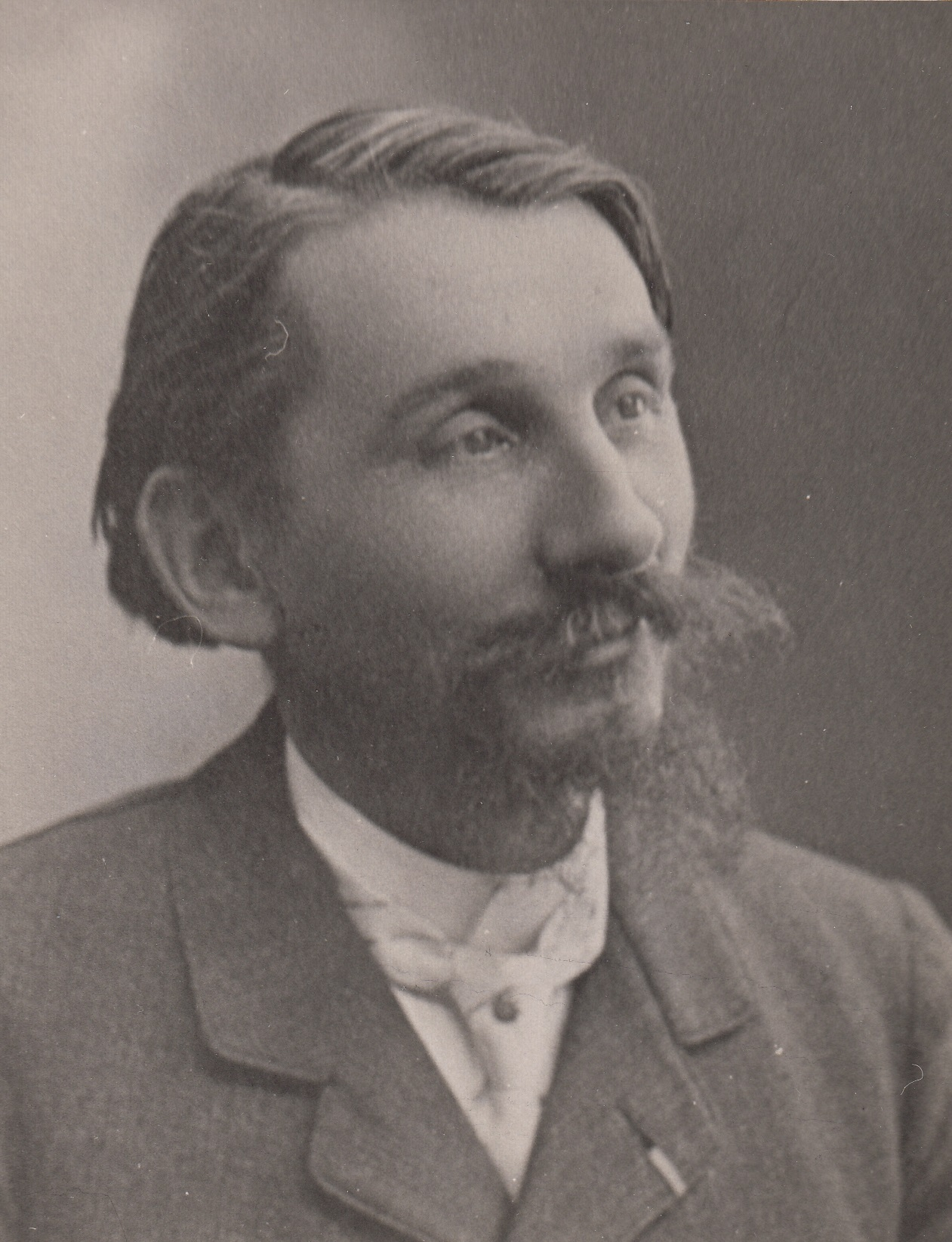
- Lebesgue around the age of 35
- Born: Philéas Ernest Lebesgue; 26 November 1869; La Neuville-Vault, Picardy, France
- Died: 11 October 1958 (aged 88); La Neuville-Vault, Picardy, France
- Occupation: Essayist • translator • poet • novelist • literary critic
- Notable work: Mercure de France (editor)

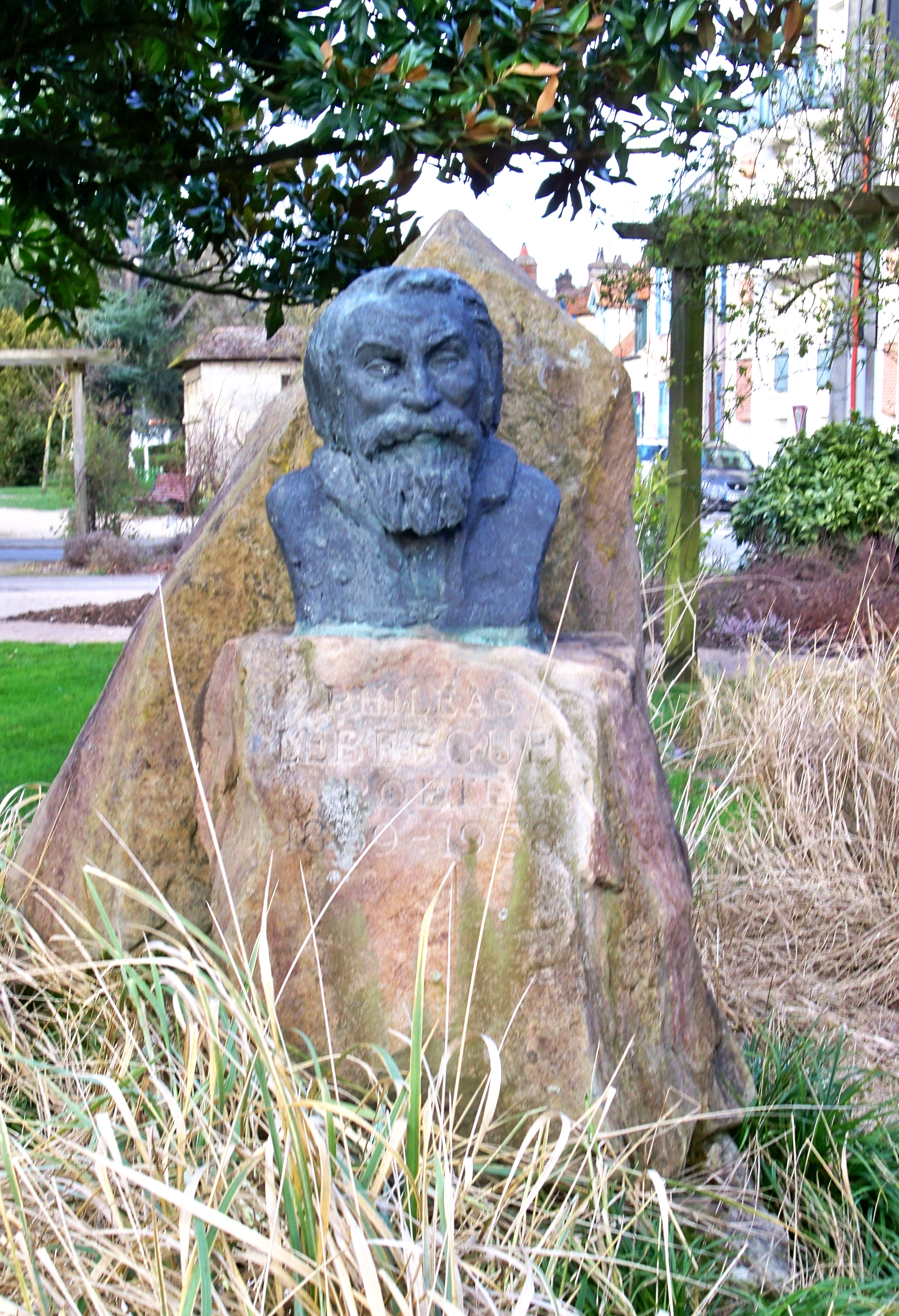
A bust of Philéas Lebesgue in Beauvais

Philéas Lebesgue (26 November 1869 – 11 October 1958) was a French essayist, translator, poet, novelist, literary critic, and editor of Mercure de France.

== Life and career ==
Philéas Lebesgue was born on 26 November 1869 in La Neuville-Vault, Picardy, France, to a family of farmers. He later embarked on a literary career, which included travels to Portugal, Greece, and the former Yugoslavia, the three countries for which he contributed literary chronicles to Mercure de France.

After studying Latin, English, and Greek in college, Lebesgue went on to learn additional languages and wrote his first poems. In 1896, he became an editor at Mercure de France, an international journal. He served as the chronicler of "Portuguese Letters," a role he held until 1951. In 1913, he was one of the few critics to discover and appreciate the great Portuguese poet Fernando Pessoa.

Philéas Lebesgue studied at least sixteen foreign languages, including German, English, Danish, Spanish, Galician, Welsh, Greek, Italian, Norwegian, Polish, Portuguese, Romanian, Russian, Serbo-Croatian, Slovenian, and Czech. He also learned Sanskrit, Old French, and three regional French languages: Breton, Provençal, and Picard. He contributed to various foreign language magazines, including L'Arte (Coimbra, 1895–1896), Atlantida (Lisbon, 1917), O Mundo (Lisbon, 1915), The Panathenaic (Athens, 1910), Periodikon nios (Piraeus, 1900), and The Vos (Madrid, 1923).

Starting in 1926, Lebesgue chaired the Academy of the Ten Provinces and the League of Provincial Writers, both of which aimed to unite regional writers from France's foreign and colonial territories.

In his early years, Lebesgue was a Symbolist poet, writing both in traditional verse and free verse. His poems often evoked the landscapes of his native region, Bray.

In addition to being a novelist, songwriter, playwright, literary critic, columnist, and translator, Lebesgue also served as mayor of La Neuville-Vault from 1908 to 1947. His works were inspired by nature, history, rural life, his travels, and esotericism.

Lebesgue died in his hometown of La Neuville-Vault on 11 October 1958, at the age of 88.

== Lebesgue and esotericism ==
The esotericism of Philéas Lebesgue was as poetic as that of his friend Oscar Milosz. In 1911, he joined the French Celtic League, founded by poet Robert Pelletier, to challenge the "misconceptions" about the Latin character of France. He later accepted the position of Grand Druide des Gaules, the spiritual authority of the Collège Bardique des Gaules, which was established in 1933 by poet and music publisher Jacques Heugel.

He was already a Breton bard when he received the second prize from L'Hermine in 1892.

== Société des Amis de Philéas Lebesgue ==
The Société des Amis de Philéas Lebesgue, or Association of Friends of Philéas Lebesgue, was founded in 1930 by teachers Camille Belliard and Marius Alphonse Gossez. The purpose of the association is to promote the life and work of the writer.

== Bibliography ==
Lebesgue wrote 37 collections of poetry, ranging from 12 to 205 pages; 18 novels, stories, and plays; 13 essays on philology and history; and 21 translations (either alone or in collaboration, mainly with Manoel Gahisto, also known as Paul Coolen). His translations included three from Old French, two from Breton, two from Spanish, seven from the Greek Revival, and three from Portuguese and Serbo-Croatian.

Major collections of poems

- Le Buisson ardent, Seiches-sur-le-Loir: Ed. Henry Cormeau, 1910; reissued in 1988, 161 p.
- Les Servitudes, Paris, Ed. du Mercure de France, 1913, 169 p.
- La Grande pitié, Paris, Ed. Edward Sansot, 1920, 116 p.
- La Bûche dans l'âtre, Paris, Ed. Chiberre, 1923, 143 p.
- Les Chansons de Margot, Amiens, Ed. Edgar Malfère, 1926, reissued in 1991, 205 p.
- Présages, Paris, Ed. André Delpeuch, 1928, 104 p. (Prix Jean Moréas, 1929).
- Triptolème ébloui, Paris, Ed; de la Revue des Poètes, Lib. acad. Perrin, 1930, 171 p.
- Arc-en-ciel, poèmes in mémoriam, La Chapelle-aux-Pots, Calligrapher R. Biet, 1938, 88 p.
- Sur les pas du soleil, Paris, Ed. Jean-Renard, 1944, 93 p.
- An anthology featuring 800 out of 1600 poems, selected by André Matrat, was published under the title Œuvres poétiques in three volumes of 450 pages each. Méru: Ed. du Thelle, 1950–1952.

Main novels and short stories

- Le Sang de l'autre, Paris, Sté d'éd. littéraires, 1901; reissued in 1949, 1967, and 2010 by Éditions le Trotteur ailé, 313 p.
- Destin: Journal d'une femme was first published under the title Les Feuilles de rose: Journal d'une femme in 1903, Paris: Ed. Charles. It was reissued in 1904, 1934, and 1990, 220 p.
- La Nuit rouge, Paris: Ed. Sansot, 1905. The second edition was translated into Spanish by César A. Comet as La Noche roja, Madrid: Editorial-America, 1925. It was reissued in French in 1946 and 1987.
- Outre-Terre, aventures dans l'invisible, Paris, Ed. de la Phalange, 80 p. The second edition in Spanish, translated by César A. Comet, was published alongside La Noche roja in 1925.
- Kalochori: Roman crétois, Paris: Ed. Eugène Figuières, 1928; reissued in 1969, 252 p.
- Terre picarde: Trois nouvelles, Grandvilliers: Ed. du Bonhomme picard, 1950. Second edition: Cuise-la-Motte: Ed. du Trotteur ailé, 2008, 95 p.

Some tragedies and dramas

- La Tragédie du Grand Ferré, dramatic trilogy in verse, Paris, Ed. des Libraires associés, 1892, 204 p.
- Thomas Becket, tragedy in verse, 1942, unpublished
- Philippe de Dreux, tragedy in verse, 1943, unpublished
- Le Rachat de Prométhée, dramatic poem, Vieux-Condé (Nord), Ed. Le Sol clair, 1947, 32 p.

Main tests

- Les Lois de la parole, essai de synthèse phonétique, Beauvais, Imp. du Moniteur de l'Oise, 16 p., 1899
- L'Au-delà des grammaires, essay on general prosody, Paris, Ed. Sansot, 314 p., 1904
- Aux fenêtres de France, "Essai sur la formation du goût français", Paris, Ed. Sansot, 1906, 93 p., reissued in 1934.
- La Grèce littéraire d'aujourd'hui, Ed Sansot, Paris, 84 p., 1906
- Le Pèlerinage à Babel, voyage d'un indigène de Counani à la recherche de la langue parfaite, Ed. Sansot, Paris, 167 p., 1912
- La République portugaise "Le sentiment national - Les ouvriers de l'ère moderne - La République vivante", Ed. Sansot, Paris, 387 p., 1914
- La Pensée de Rabindranath Tagore, Bruxelles, Ed. de La Nervie, 1927, 35 p., reissued in 2003 in the Bulletin des Amis de Philéas Lebesgue n°37.
- L'Héritage intellectuel de Virgile au Portugal et en France, Ed. Institut français au Portugal, Coïmbre, 30 p., 1932
- La Musique primitive dans ses rapports avec la poésie lyrique, article in the journal L'Âge nouveau, Oct. 1938.

Published articles in journals and newspapers

Lebesgue contributed to over two hundred publications, with Mercure de France being the most prominent.

- Philéas Lebesgue wrote approximately 500 articles in Mercure de France from 1896 to 1951, including "The Portuguese Letters," and intermittently "Letters from Norway," "The New Greek Letters," and "Letters from Yugoslavia."
- Editorials in La République de l'Oise: 330 articles from May 1910 to May 1941, and 93 articles in L'Oise published from September 1944 to July 1950.

Some translations with critical commentary

- Le Songe d'enfer followed by La Voie de Paradis de Raoul de Houdenc, 13th-century poem, translation and critical commentary, Ed. Sansot, Paris, 235 p., 1908
- Les Perses de l'Occident by Sotíris Skípis, drama in 3 acts, translated from neo-Greek by the author and Philéas Lebesgue, preface by Paul Fort, Ed. Eugène Figuière, Paris, 1917
- Le Roman d'Amadis de Gaule. Reconstitution du roman portugais du XIIIe siècle by Affonso Lopes-Vieira, translated into French by Philéas Lebesgue. Ed. Claude Aveline, Paris, 222 p., 1924

in Picard language

- Ein acoutant l'cloque de l'Toussaint, Rédriyes picardes, Imp. de l'Hebdomadaire picard, Grandvilliers, 46 p., 1939
- Poèmes et contes brayons, tales scattered in magazines from 1892 to 1949 or unpublished, collected, commented on with translation by François Beauvy, posthumous publication, Beauvais, Centre départemental de documentation pédagogique, coll. Éklitra, 85 p., 1986
- Grammaire picard-brayonne, presented by René Debrie and François Beauvy, posthumous publication, Centre d'études picardes, Université de Picardie, Amiens, 63 p., 1984

== Studies devoted to Philéas Lebesgue ==
- Gahisto (P.-M.), Au cœur des provinces - Philéas Lebesgue, Roubaix, Ed. du Beffroi, 1908, 80 p.
- Gossez (A.-M.), Les Célébrités d'aujourd'hui - Philéas Lebesgue, Paris, Ed. Sansot, 1924, 32 p.
- Striegler (Helmut), "Inaugural-Dissertation" : Philéas Lebesgue, ein Dichter der Pikardie, Université de Leipzig, 1934 (Study published in 1935 in Germany).
- Roger Berrou, Philéas Lebesgue le Paysan de l'Univers, in volume 1 of Œuvres poétiques, 1950, 131 p., reissued by the Société des Amis de Philéas Lebesgue, 1996.
- Pierre Garnier, Philéas Lebesgue, poète de Picardie, coll. Éklitra, imp. Sinet, Grandvilliers, 43 p., 1967
- Gisèle Le Crocq, Philéas Lebesgue et la Grèce, Diploma thesis, Faculty of Letters and Human Sciences of Aix-en-Provence, 1967–1968, 163 p. - Reissued in the Bulletin des Amis de Philéas Lebesgue (No. 38 of 2004 to No. 42 of 2008).
- André Camus, Jean Dubillet, and Pierre Garnier, Le centenaire de Philéas Lebesgue, Eklitra, Amiens, 1969, 35 p.
- François Beauvy, Le Paysage dans l'œuvre poétique de Philéas Lebesgue, DEA thesis, University of Picardy -Jules Verne, 1994, published in 1995 by the Society of Friends of Philéas Lebesgue, 150 pages.
- Anton Figueroa, Lecturas alleas - Sobre das relacions con outras literaturas, Santiago de Compostele, Ed. Gotelo blanco, 1996, 155 p. (Published in Spain, deals with the correspondence of Philéas Lebesgue with Galician-speaking writers).
- Claudio Veiga, Um Brasilianista francês - Philéas Lebesgue, Rio de Janeiro, Ed. Topbooks, 1998, 185 p. (Published in Brazil).
- François Beauvy, section on Philéas Lebesgue, in the Dictionnaire de biographie française, Paris, Ed. Letouzey et Ané, tome XX, booklet 115, 2003.
- François Beauvy, Philéas Lebesgue et ses correspondants en France et dans le monde, doctoral thesis, University of Paris X - Nanterre, 2003, published in 2004, Beauvais, Ed. Awen, 674 p. et 16 p. off-text by Philéas Lebesgue and his colleagues.

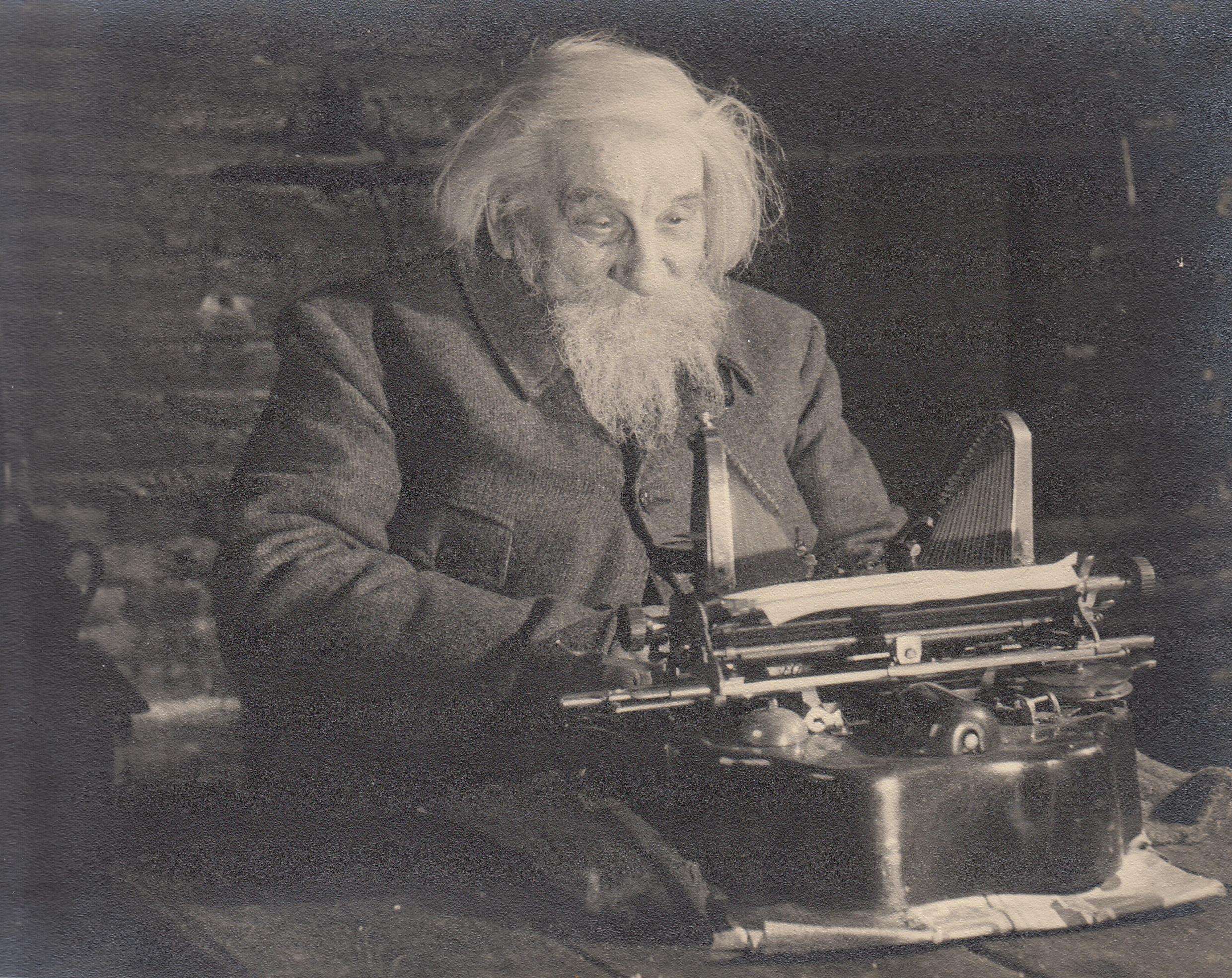
Philéas Lebesgue, at home, December 1949
