= Jean Émile Laboureur =

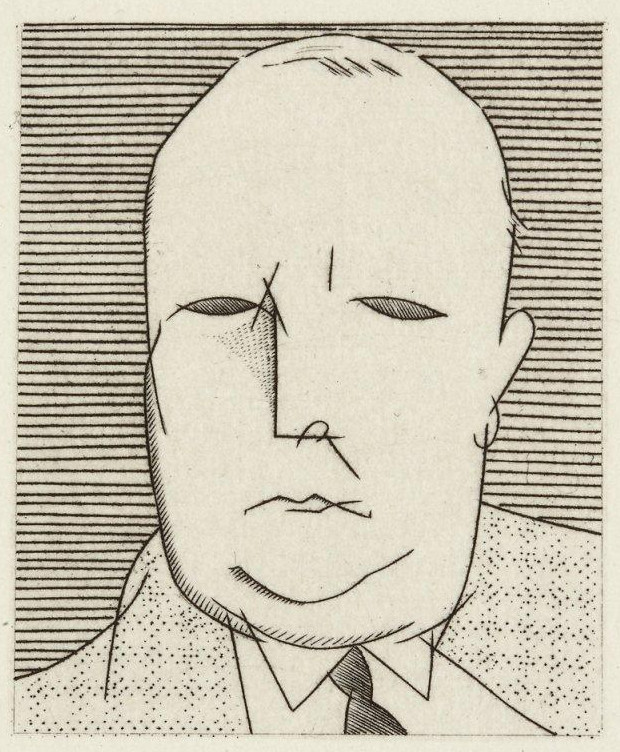
Self-portrait (mid-1920s)

Émile Laboureur, known as Jean Émile (16 August 1877, Nantes – 16 June 1943, near Pénestin) was a French painter, designer, engraver, watercolorist, lithographer, and illustrator.

== Biography ==
He was born to a prosperous bourgeois family. In 1895, he went to Paris and, following his father's wishes, enrolled at a law school. He stayed for only a short time before deciding to pursue a career in the fine arts instead, studying at the Académie Julian, where he learned engraving from Auguste-Louis Lepère. His debut at the Salon came in 1896. Most of his initial works were wood engravings on Primitivist themes, reminiscent of Paul Gauguin.

After a stay in Germany, visiting museums, he went to the United States in 1904. It was there he first began referring to himself as "Jean Émile". He returned to the United States and Canada several times from 1905 to 1909, to participate in exhibits. After 1911, he travelled to England, Italy, Greece, and Turkey.

Upon returning to Europe, he settled in Paris, where he switched from wood engraving to etching. Despite being conscripted in 1914, he continued to make sketches for his works and published three series of engravings on the theme of war.

He illustrated his first book, L'Appartement des jeunes filles by Roger Allard, in 1919. He would eventually illustrate sixty-six titles, including works by Jean Giraudoux, Jacques Cazotte, Remy de Gourmont, Auguste de Villiers de L'Isle-Adam, André Maurois, Colette, Tristan Derème, Anna de Noailles, Paul-Jean Toulet and Marcel Proust. He also contributed to magazines and journals, such as Gazette du Bon Ton and La Revue musicale, and taught engraving in his workshop. Among his notable students were Marie Laurencin and André Dunoyer de Segonzac. At the beginning of the 1930s, he was commissioned to provide illustrations for the Catalogue Manufrance, which employed engravings for several decades after that.

Although based in Paris, he bought a house in Brittany and spent the summer months there. One of his drawings of a Breton landscape was engraved by Jean Antonin Delzers and featured on the two Francs stamp in 1935. From 1928 to 1935, he wrote several books and articles on the art of engraving; notably Considérations sur la gravure originale (1928), published in Brussels.

During World War II, he became ill and retired to his home near Pénestin, where he died in 1943. A street in Nantes was named after him. His works may be seen at the Musée du Louvre, the Musée d'Orsay, the Musée des Beaux-Arts de Nantes and the Musée d'Art moderne Richard Anacréon.

== Selected works ==
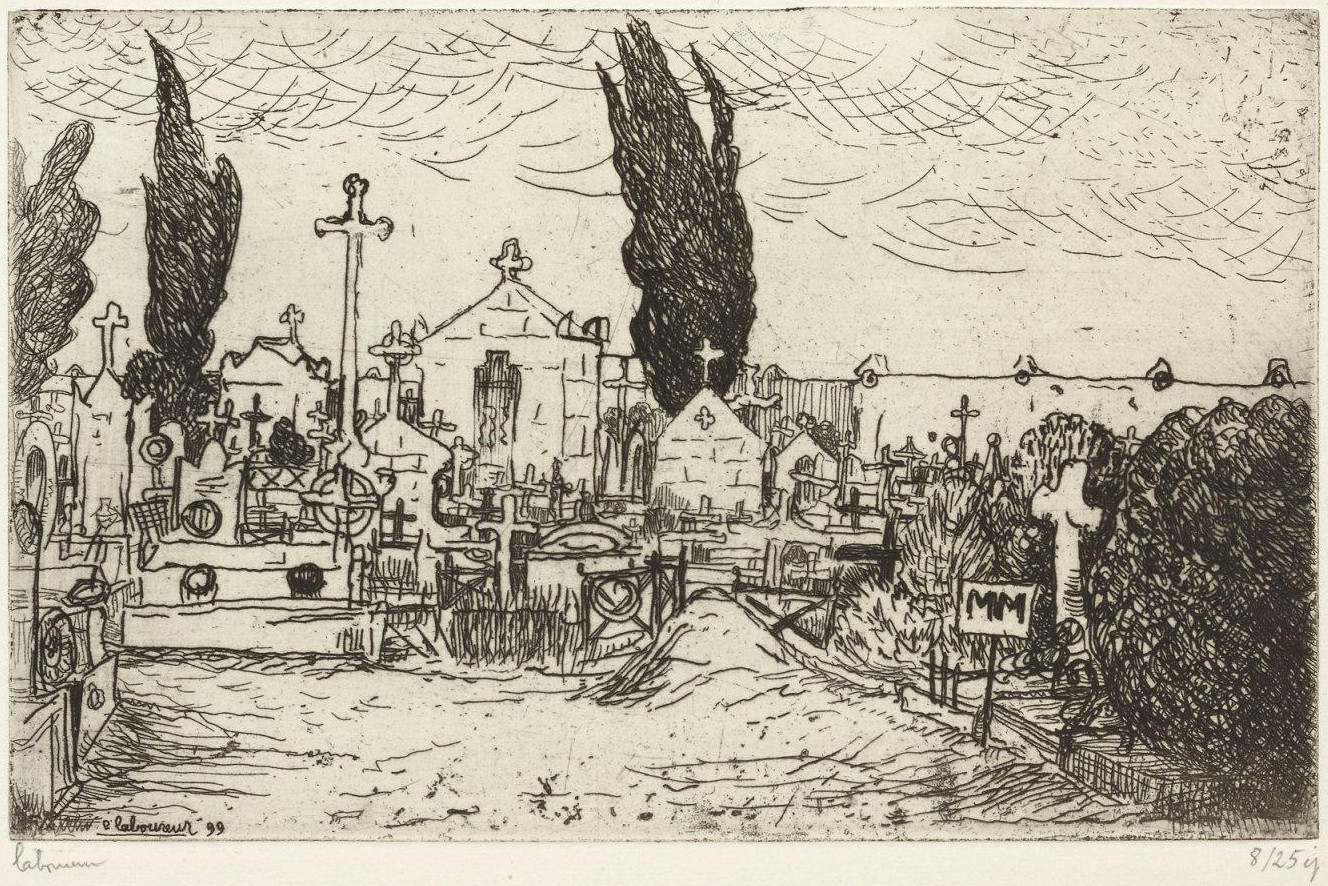
Cemetery

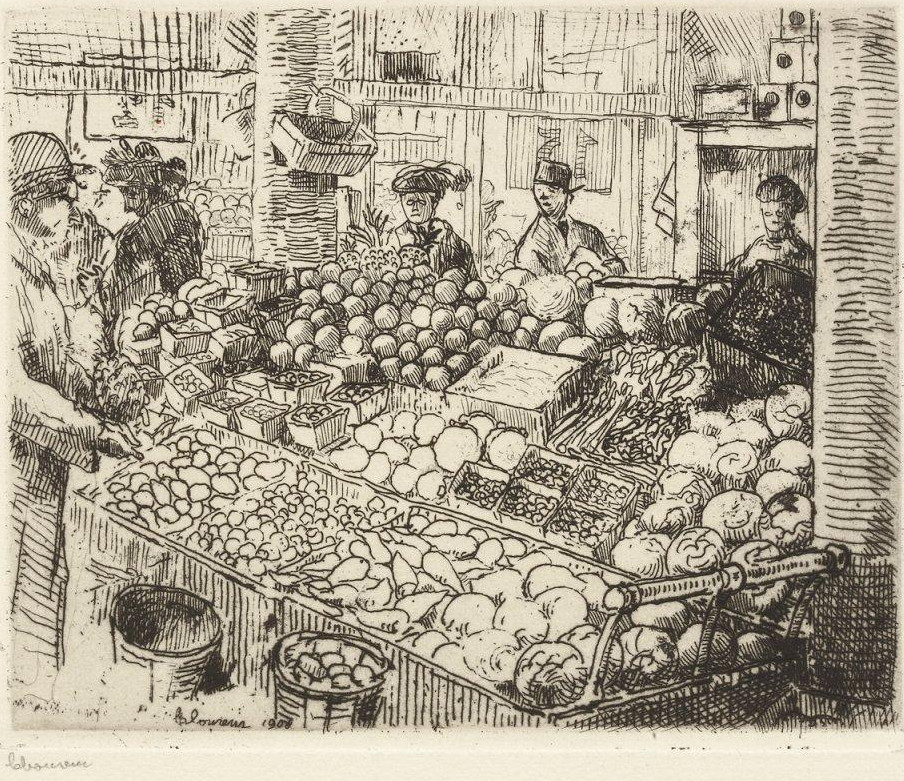
Vegetable Market

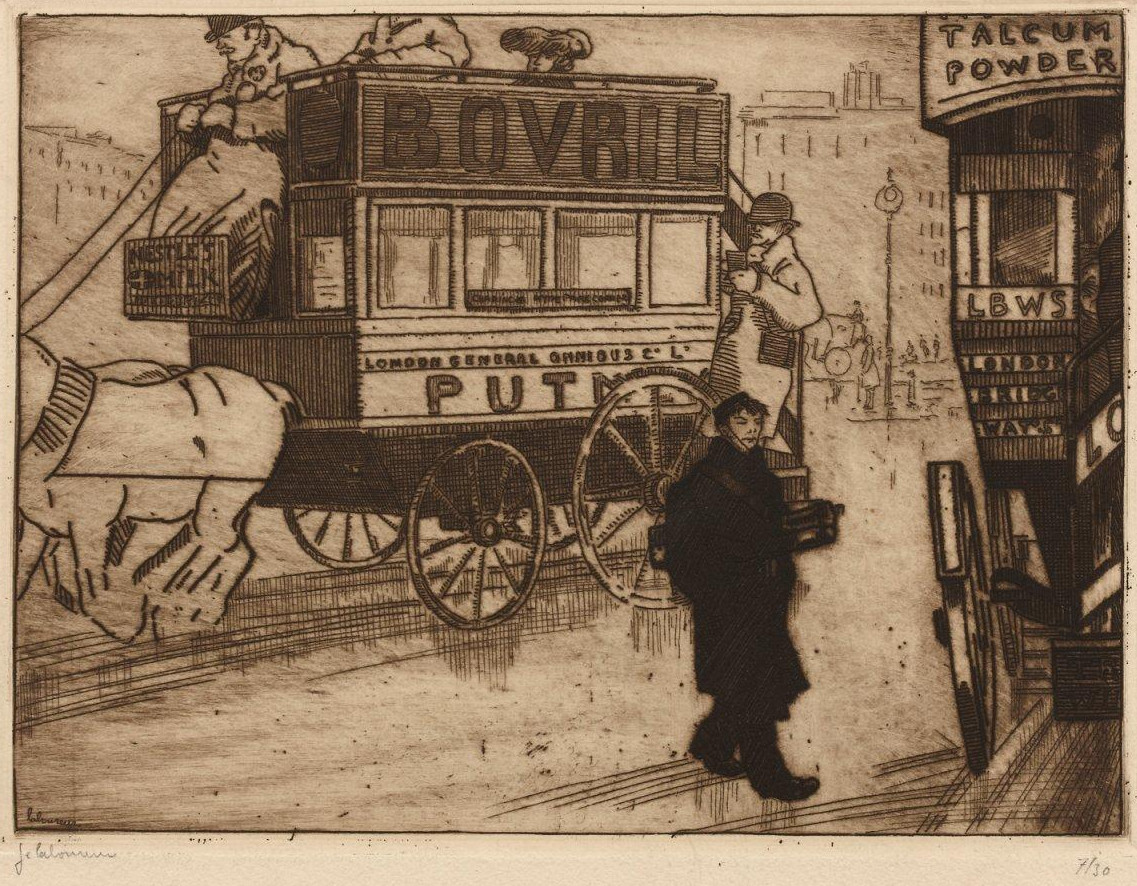
The Last Bus

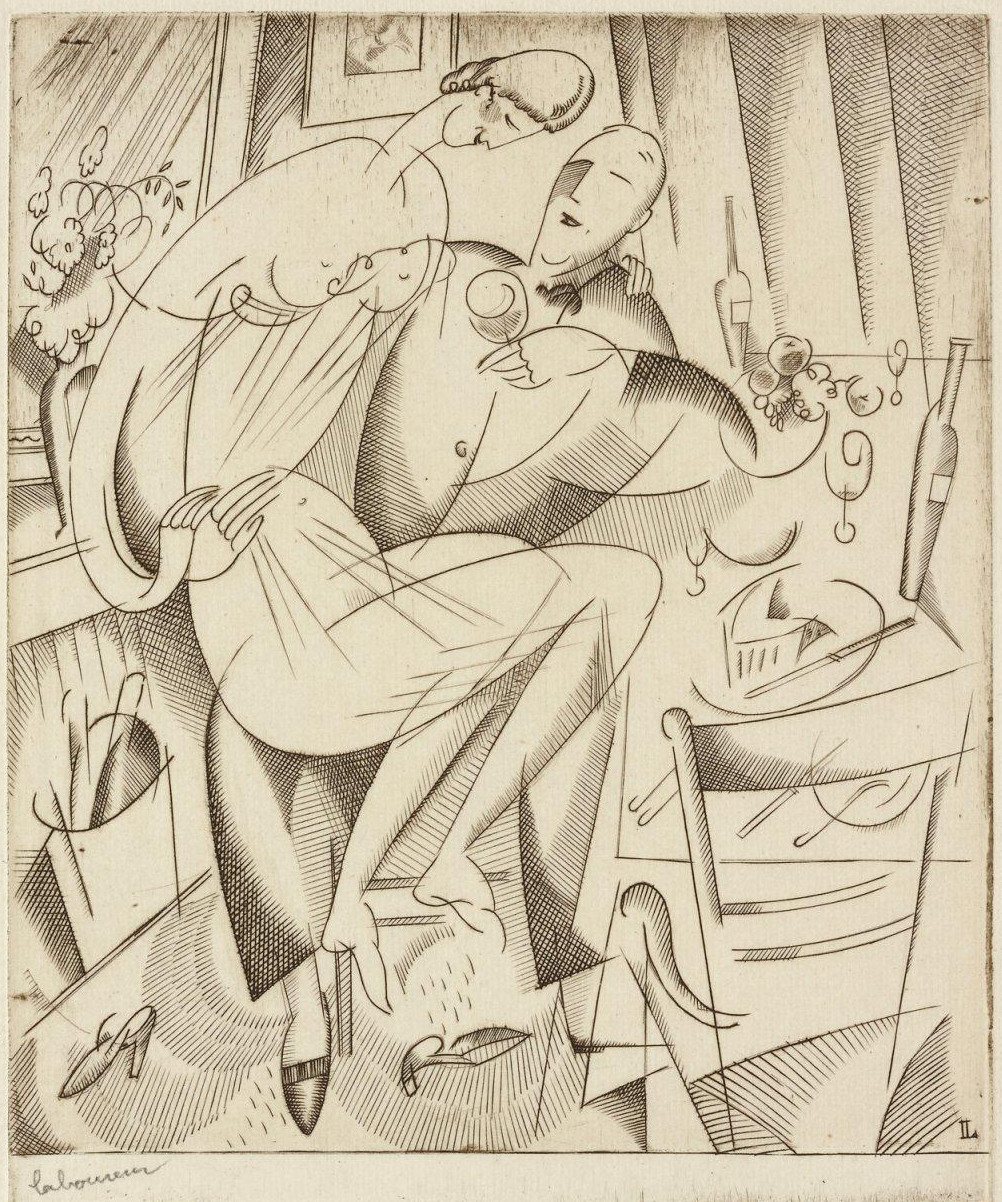
Bachelor's Fare

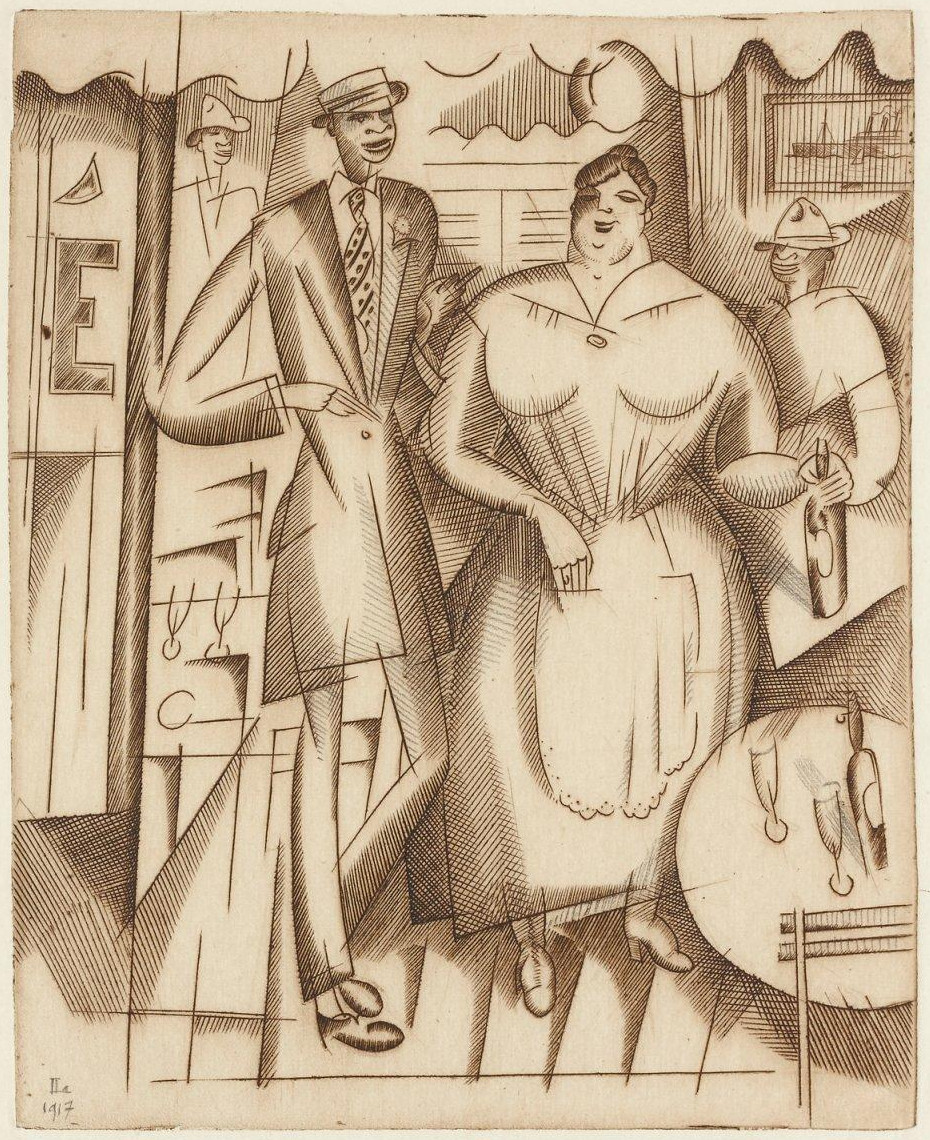
Black Americans
at Saint-Nazaire

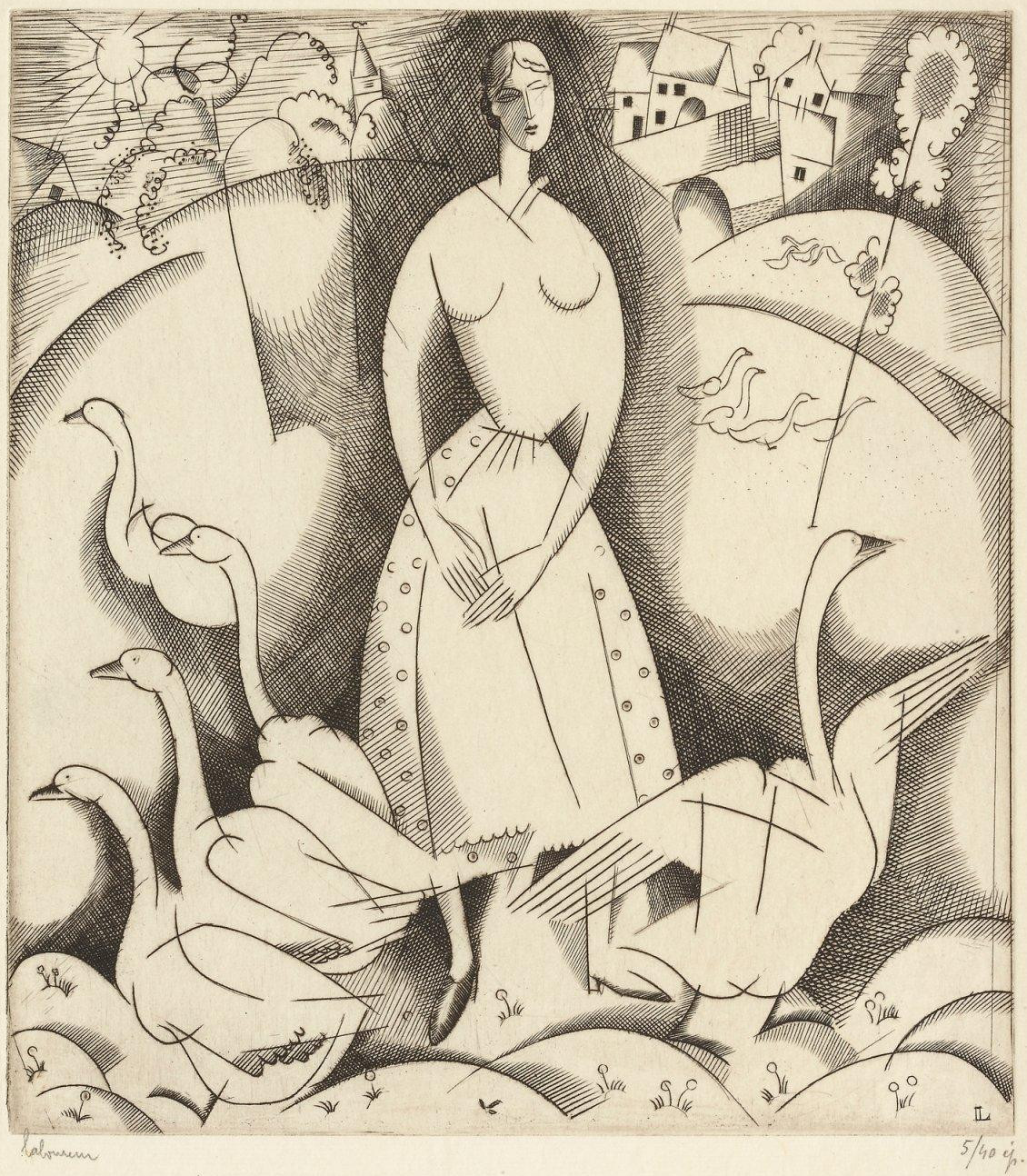
The Goose Lady
