= Parc botanique du Prieuré d'Orchaise =

Botanical garden and park in Centre-Val de Loire, France

Coordinates: 47.5887°N 1.2007°E

The Parc botanique du Prieuré d'Orchaise (3 hectares) is a botanical garden and park located on the grounds of the former priory at the Place de l'Eglise, Orchaise, Loir-et-Cher, Centre-Val de Loire, France. It is open daily except Friday in the warmer months; an admission fee is charged.

The priory itself comprises buildings from the 15th and 19th century built on ancient foundations, and between the two world wars was home to Gabriel Hanotaux (1853–1944), historian and Minister for Foreign Affairs. Its park, created by Hubert Treuille who traveled the world collecting specimens, received First Prize from the National Horticultural Society of France in 1993.

Today the park contains over 2,200 trees and shrubs, including magnolias, peonies, rhododendrons, and Japanese maples, as well as two lily ponds and a statue ("La Transparente") by Romanian sculptor Christian Breazu.

== See also ==
- List of botanical gardens in France
