= Valencisse =

- Commune
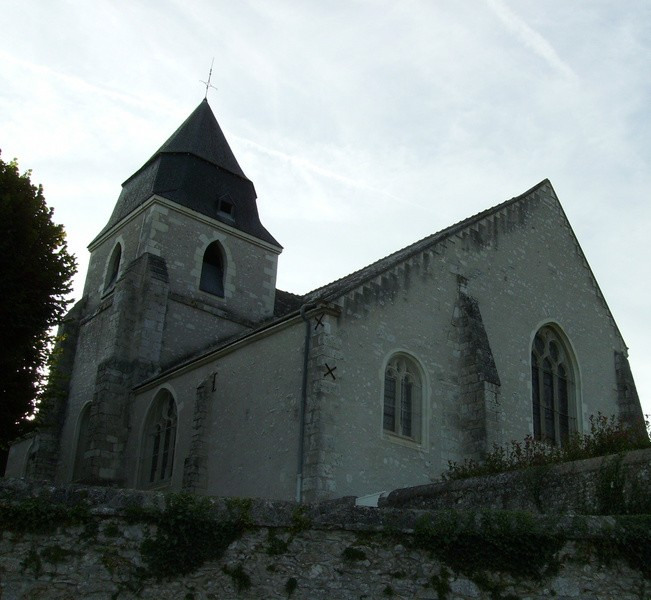
- Location of Valencisse
- Location within France Location within Centre-Val de Loire
- Coordinates: 47°34′37″N 1°13′01″E
- Country: France
- Region: Centre-Val de Loire
- Department: Loir-et-Cher
- Arrondissement: Blois
- Canton: Veuzain-sur-Loire
- Intercommunality: CA Blois Agglopolys

Government
  - Mayor (2020–2026): Gérard Charzat
- Area^{1}: 43.76 km^{2} (16.90 sq mi)
- Population (2023): 2,324
  - Density: 53.11/km^{2} (137.5/sq mi)
- Time zone: UTC+01:00 (CET)
  - Summer (DST): UTC+02:00 (CEST)
- INSEE/Postal code: 41142 /41190
- ^{1} French Land Register data, which excludes lakes, ponds, glaciers > 1 km^{2} (0.386 sq mi or 247 acres) and river estuaries.

Valencisse (French pronunciation: [valɑ̃sis]) is a commune in the Loir-et-Cher department of central France. The municipality was established on 1 January 2016 by merger of the former communes of Molineuf and Orchaise. On 1 January 2017, the former commune of Chambon-sur-Cisse was merged into Valencisse.

== Population ==
Population data refer to the commune in its geography as of January 2025.

Historical population
Year	Pop.	±% p.a.
1968	1,282	—
1975	1,617	+3.37%
1982	2,124	+3.97%
1990	2,365	+1.35%
1999	2,398	+0.15%
2007	2,389	−0.05%
2012	2,405	+0.13%
2017	2,398	−0.06%
2023	2,324	−0.52%
Source: INSEE

== See also ==
- Communes of the Loir-et-Cher department
