= Chambon-sur-Cisse =

- Part of Valencisse
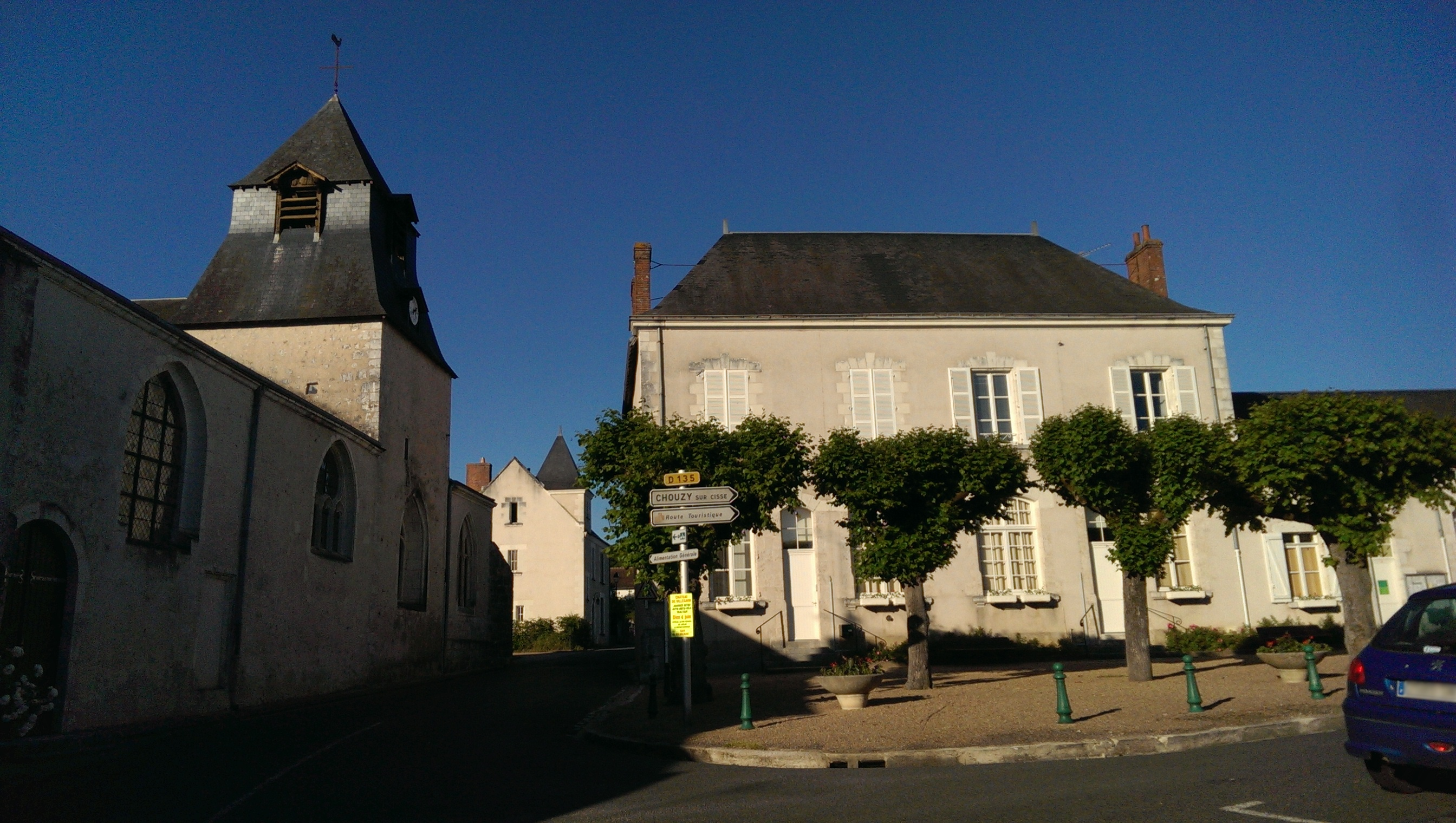
- Town hall

- Coat of arms
- Location of Chambon-sur-Cisse
- Location within France Location within Centre-Val de Loire
- Coordinates: 47°33′48″N 1°13′01″E
- Country: France
- Region: Centre-Val de Loire
- Department: Loir-et-Cher
- Arrondissement: Blois
- Canton: Veuzain-sur-Loire
- Commune: Valencisse
- Area^{1}: 12.71 km^{2} (4.91 sq mi)
- Elevation: 79 m (259 ft)
- Highest elevation: 131 m (430 ft)
- Lowest elevation: 72 m (236 ft)
- Population (2023): 680
  - Density: 54/km^{2} (140/sq mi)
- Time zone: UTC+01:00 (CET)
  - Summer (DST): UTC+02:00 (CEST)
- Postal code: 41190
- ^{1} French Land Register data, which excludes lakes, ponds, glaciers > 1 km^{2} (0.386 sq mi or 247 acres) and river estuaries.

Chambon-sur-Cisse (French pronunciation: [ʃɑ̃bɔ̃ syʁ sis], literally Chambon on Cisse) is a former commune in the Loir-et-Cher department in central France. On 1 January 2017, it was merged into the commune Valencisse.

== See also ==
- Communes of the Loir-et-Cher department
