= Jean Laigret =

French biologist (1893–1966)

Jean Laigret (17 August 1893 – 11 March 1966) was a French biologist born in Blois.

In 1932, he developed the first vaccine against yellow fever.

== Biography ==
He was a student of the École principale du service de Santé de la Marine at Bordeaux, and during World War I, served in the infantry. In 1915 he sustained war wounds, receiving the Croix de Guerre. In 1919 he defended his doctoral thesis with Contribution à la prophylaxie de la syphilis. From 1921 to 1923 he worked at a hospital in Brazzaville, Middle Congo, subsequently becoming an assistant at the Pasteur Institute in Brazzaville. Here he worked on a treatment for trypanosomiasis by testing orsanine and suramine that were developed by chemist Ernest Fourneau (1872–1949).

In 1927 he was appointed head of the laboratory at the Pasteur Institute in Saigon, and soon afterwards was transferred to Dakar, where he was promoted to medical officer of hygiene (1928). The following year he became director of the laboratory in Bamako, then returned to France in 1930, where he was appointed instructor of microbiology classes at the Pasteur Institute.

In 1932 he became head of the laboratory at the Pasteur Institute of Tunis. Here he conducted tests on a vaccine against yellow fever, using a vaccine produced from the brains of mice that were infected with the yellow fever virus. In 1934, while based in Dakar, he administered the yellow fever vaccine to the populace on a large-scale basis. The vaccine used in West Africa was deemed successful; its primary negative being reports of benign febrile reactions.

From 1935 to 1937 he taught classes at the faculty of medicine in Paris. In 1941 he was dismissed by the Vichy government, subsequently becoming a lecturer at the faculty of medicine in Algiers, replacing Ernest Pinoy (1873–1948). In 1945 he returned to the Pasteur Institute in Tunis, then several years later, served as a professor of bacteriology and hygiene at the University of Strasbourg (1950–60).

He died in Molineuf, Loire-et-Cher in 1966.
