= La Neuville-Vault =

- Commune
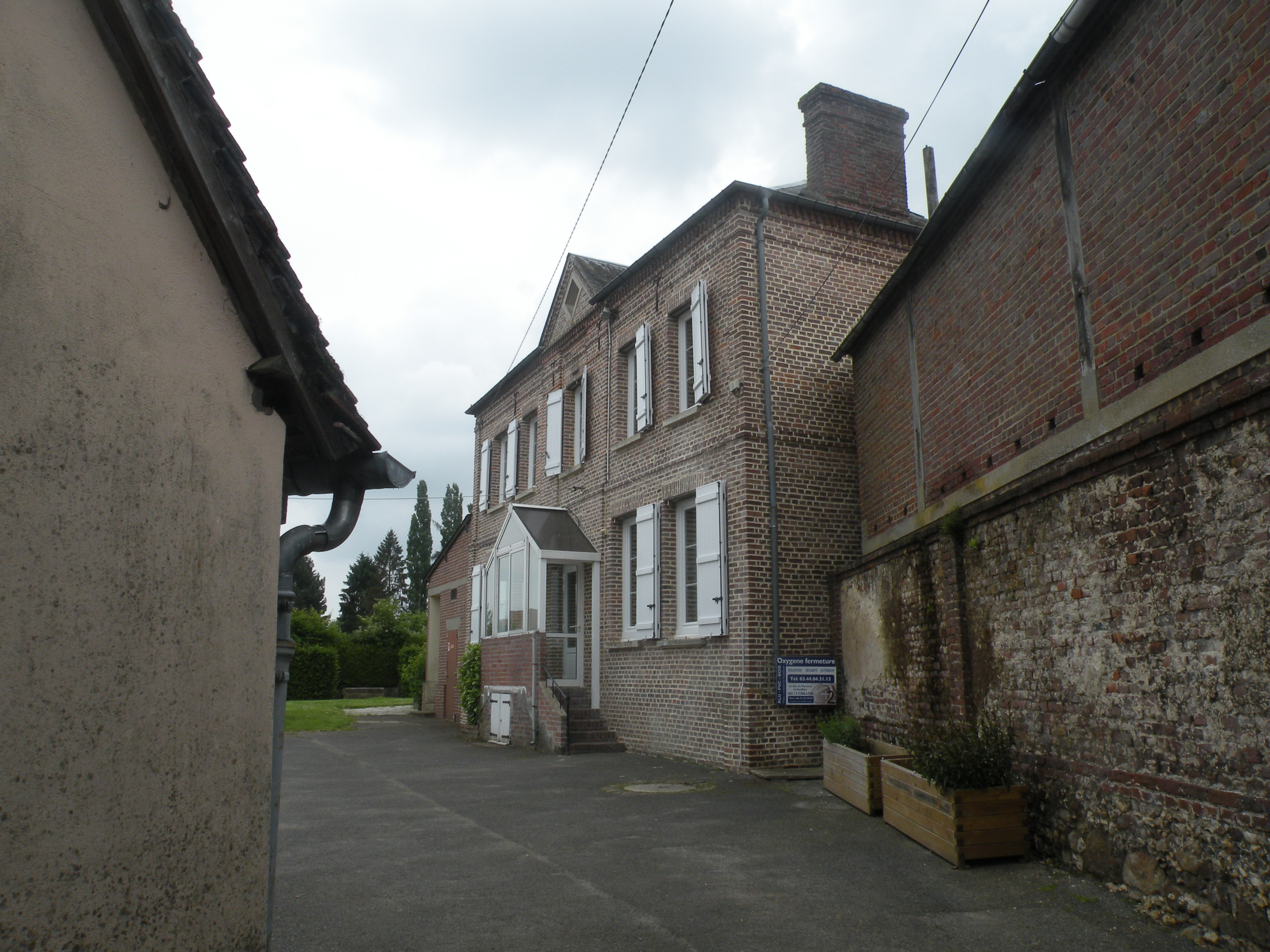
- The town hall in La Neuville-Vault
- Location of La Neuville-Vault
- Location within France Location within Hauts-de-France
- Coordinates: 49°29′14″N 1°57′08″E
- Country: France
- Region: Hauts-de-France
- Department: Oise
- Arrondissement: Beauvais
- Canton: Grandvilliers
- Intercommunality: Picardie Verte

Government
  - Mayor (2020–2026): Thierry Gilles
- Area^{1}: 4.52 km^{2} (1.75 sq mi)
- Elevation: 140 m (460 ft)
- Highest elevation: 178 m (584 ft)
- Lowest elevation: 85 m (279 ft)
- Population (2023): 213
  - Density: 47.1/km^{2} (122/sq mi)
- Time zone: UTC+01:00 (CET)
  - Summer (DST): UTC+02:00 (CEST)
- INSEE/Postal code: 60460 /60112
- ^{1} French Land Register data, which excludes lakes, ponds, glaciers > 1 km^{2} (0.386 sq mi or 247 acres) and river estuaries.

La Neuville-Vault (Picard: L’Neuville-Weu) is a commune in the Oise department in northern France.

== See also ==
- Communes of the Oise department
