= Orchaise =

- Part of Valencisse
- Coat of arms
- Location of Orchaise
- Location within France Location within Centre-Val de Loire
- Coordinates: 47°35′27″N 1°11′58″E
- Country: France
- Region: Centre-Val de Loire
- Department: Loir-et-Cher
- Arrondissement: Blois
- Canton: Veuzain-sur-Loire
- Commune: Valencisse
- Area^{1}: 20.03 km^{2} (7.73 sq mi)
- Elevation: 137 m (449 ft)
- Highest elevation: 146 m (479 ft)
- Lowest elevation: 77 m (253 ft)
- Population (2022): 917
  - Density: 45.8/km^{2} (119/sq mi)
- Time zone: UTC+01:00 (CET)
  - Summer (DST): UTC+02:00 (CEST)
- Postal code: 41190
- ^{1} French Land Register data, which excludes lakes, ponds, glaciers > 1 km^{2} (0.386 sq mi or 247 acres) and river estuaries.

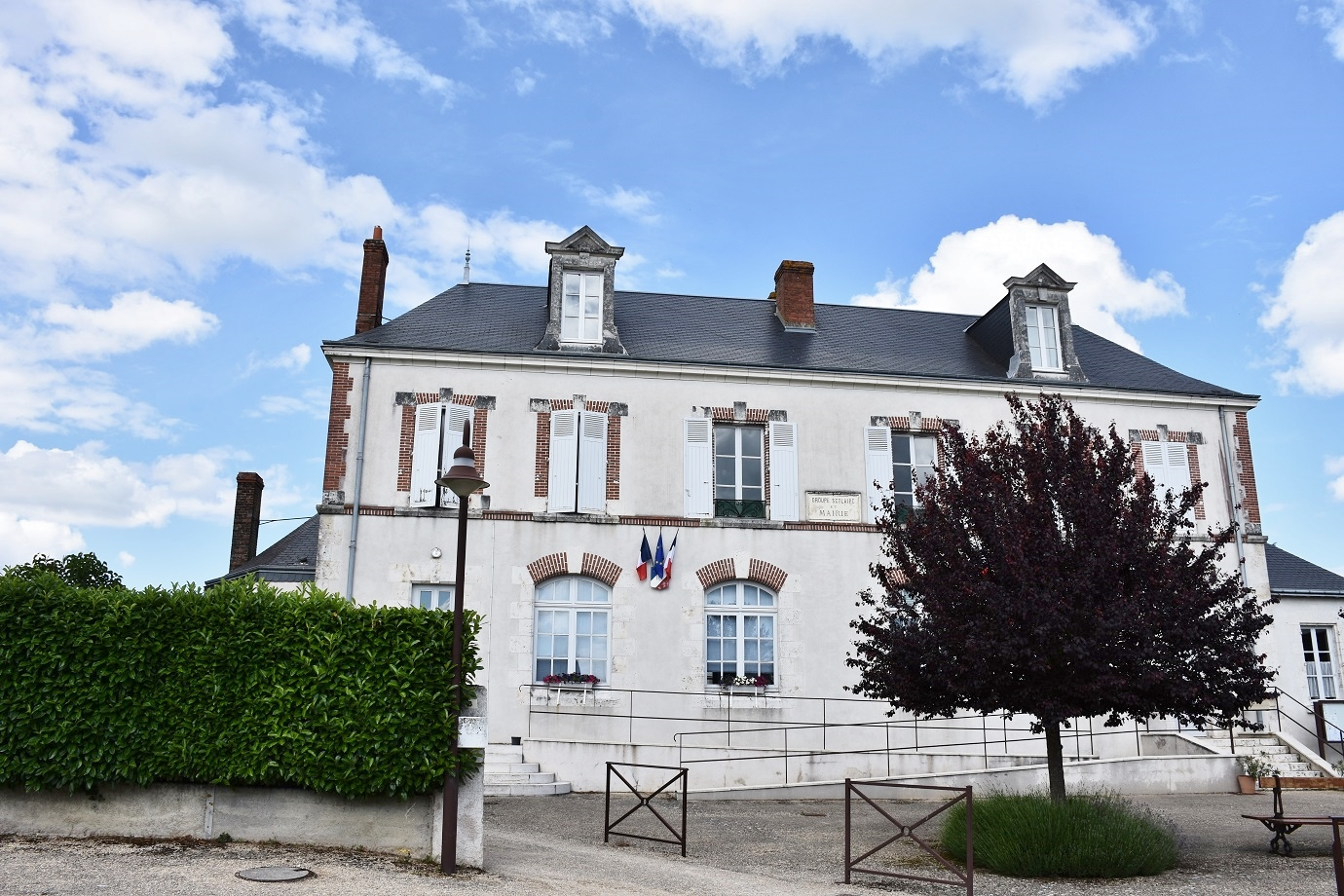
Orchaise

Orchaise (French pronunciation: [ɔʁʃɛz]) is a former commune in the Loir-et-Cher department of central France. On 1 January 2016, it was merged into the new commune of Valencisse. Its population was 917 in 2022.

== Points of interest ==
- Parc botanique du Prieuré d'Orchaise

== See also ==
- Communes of the Loir-et-Cher department
