= Molineuf =

- Part of Valencisse
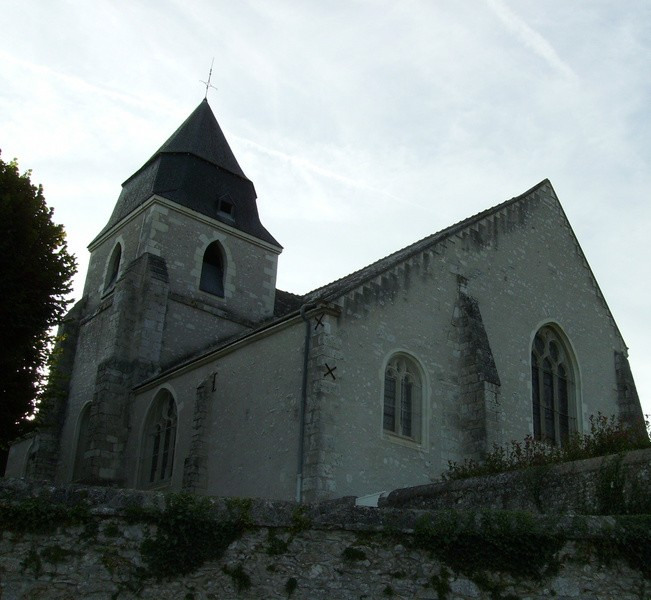
- Saint-Secondin church
- Location of Molineuf
- Location within France Location within Centre-Val de Loire
- Coordinates: 47°34′46″N 1°12′58″E
- Country: France
- Region: Centre-Val de Loire
- Department: Loir-et-Cher
- Arrondissement: Blois
- Canton: Veuzain-sur-Loire
- Commune: Valencisse
- Area^{1}: 11.02 km^{2} (4.25 sq mi)
- Elevation: 124 m (407 ft)
- Highest elevation: 145 m (476 ft)
- Lowest elevation: 72 m (236 ft)
- Population (2022): 732
  - Density: 66.4/km^{2} (172/sq mi)
- Time zone: UTC+01:00 (CET)
  - Summer (DST): UTC+02:00 (CEST)
- Postal code: 41190
- ^{1} French Land Register data, which excludes lakes, ponds, glaciers > 1 km^{2} (0.386 sq mi or 247 acres) and river estuaries.

Molineuf (French pronunciation: [mɔlinœf]) is a former commune in the Loir-et-Cher department in Centre-Val de Loire, France. On 1 January 2016, it was merged into the new commune of Valencisse.

== See also ==
- Communes of the Loir-et-Cher department
