= Auguste-Louis Lepère =

French painter

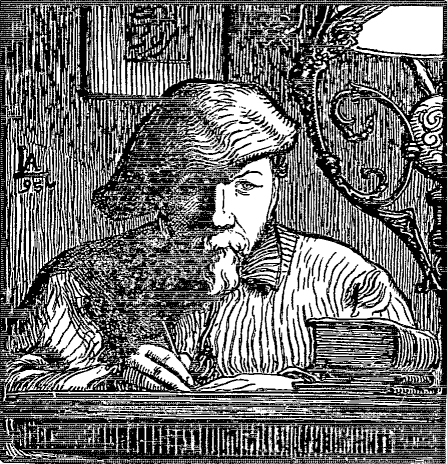
Louis-Auguste Lepère – Self-Portrait 1895 – Wood engraving – Cleveland Museum of Art

Louis-Auguste Lepère (30 November 1849 – 20 November 1918) was a French painter and etcher. Lepère is also considered a leader in the creative revival of wood engraving in Europe.

== Biography ==
Louis-Auguste Lepère was born in Paris. At the age of thirteen, he began his artistic education in the Paris studio of the engraver Joseph Burn-Smeeton. By the mid-1870s, Lepère had emerged as one of the most renowned printmakers of his time.

Lepère focused mostly on daily life in both his etchings and wood engravings. He is now remembered for his innovations, such as the use of colored paper and the combining of etching and wood engraving on the same print. The last years of Lepère's life were given almost exclusively to wood engraving. In total, his graphic oeuvre consists of over 150 etchings, over 200 wood engravings and 14 lithographs. He died at Domme, aged 68.

== Collections ==
Lepère's work is held in the permanent collections of many institutions, including the Metropolitan Museum of Art, the Art Institute of Chicago, the Allen Memorial Art Museum, the Smithsonian American Art Museum, the Portland Art Museum, the Birmingham Museum of Art, the Brooklyn Museum, the University of Michigan Museum of Art, the Fine Arts Museums of San Francisco, the Dallas Museum of Art, the Lowe Art Museum, the Blanton Museum of Art, the Philadelphia Museum of Art, the Artizon Museum, the Des Moines Art Center, the Detroit Institute of Arts, the Indianapolis Museum of Art, and the Clark Art Institute.

== Works ==
Works of Louis-Auguste Lepère

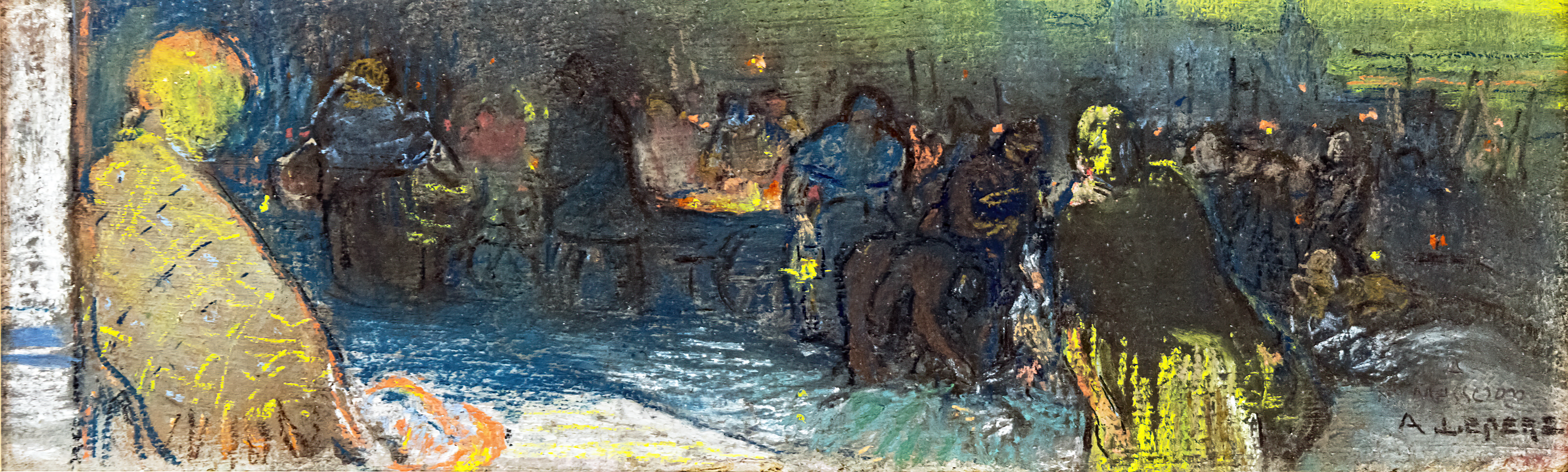
Autour du brasero (1892), pastel on cardboard

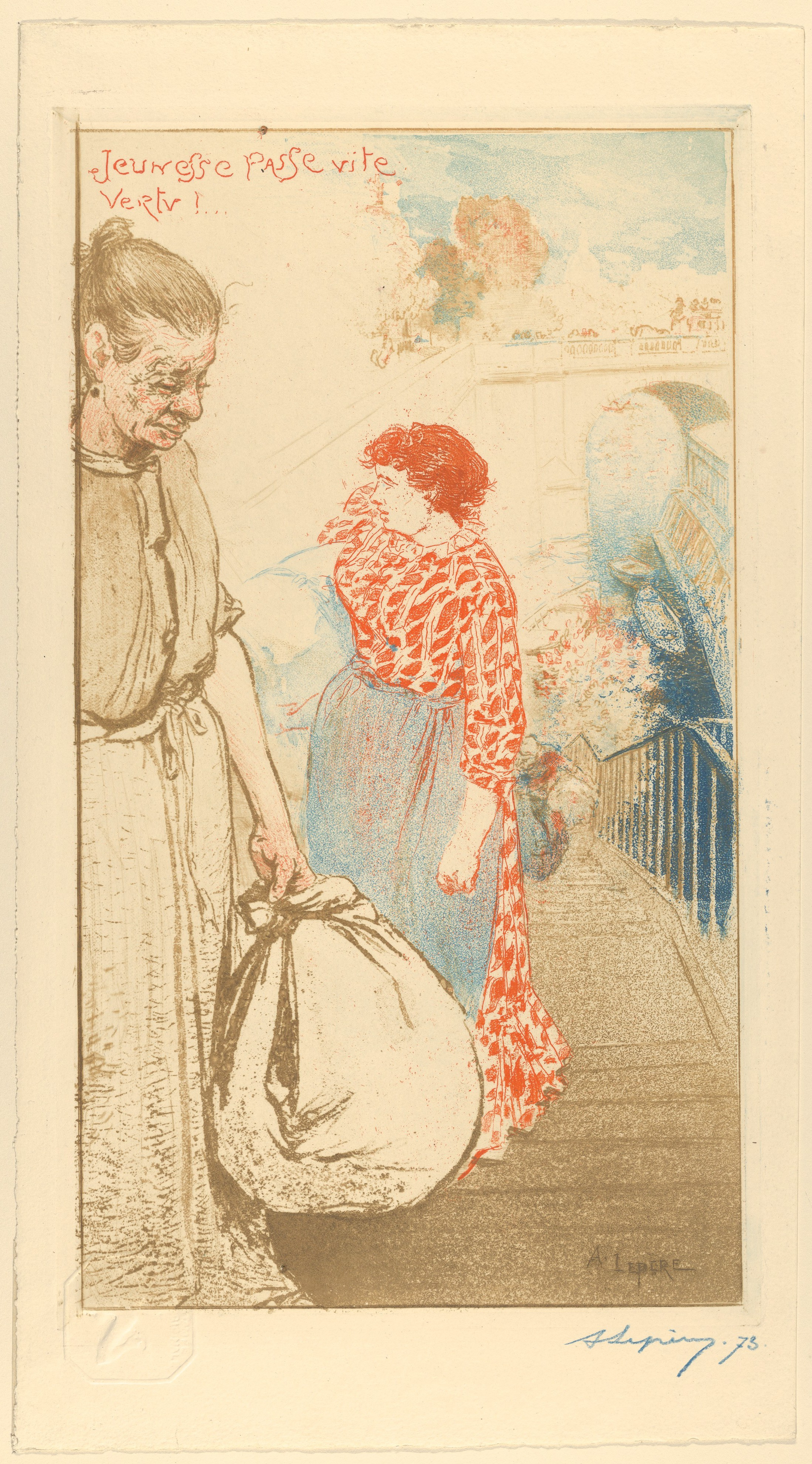
Laundresses (Blanchisseuses) - Soft-ground etching and aquatint; printed in three colors (1893)

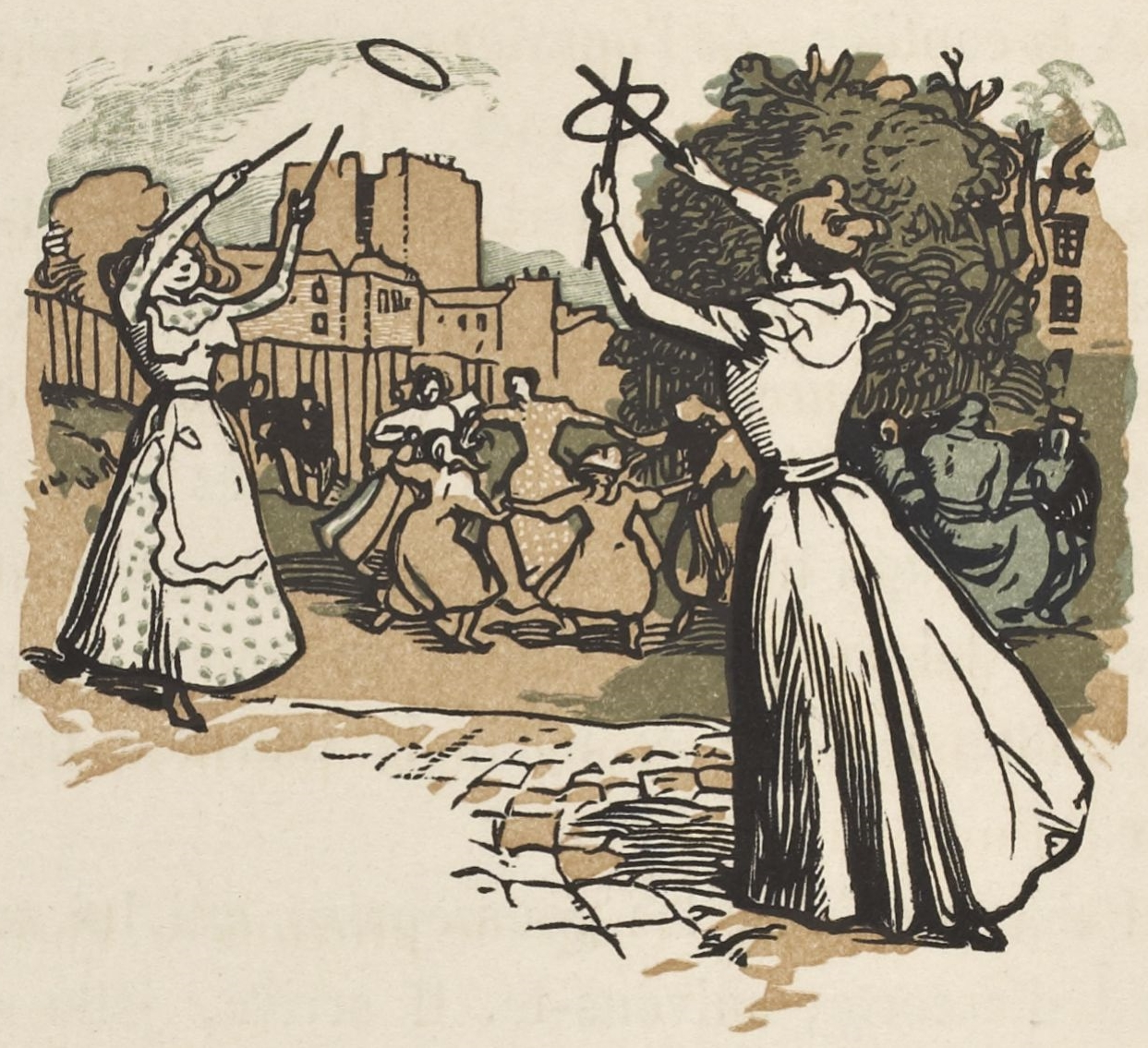
Jeu des grâces dans la rue, illustration de Paysages et coins de rues de Jean Richepin

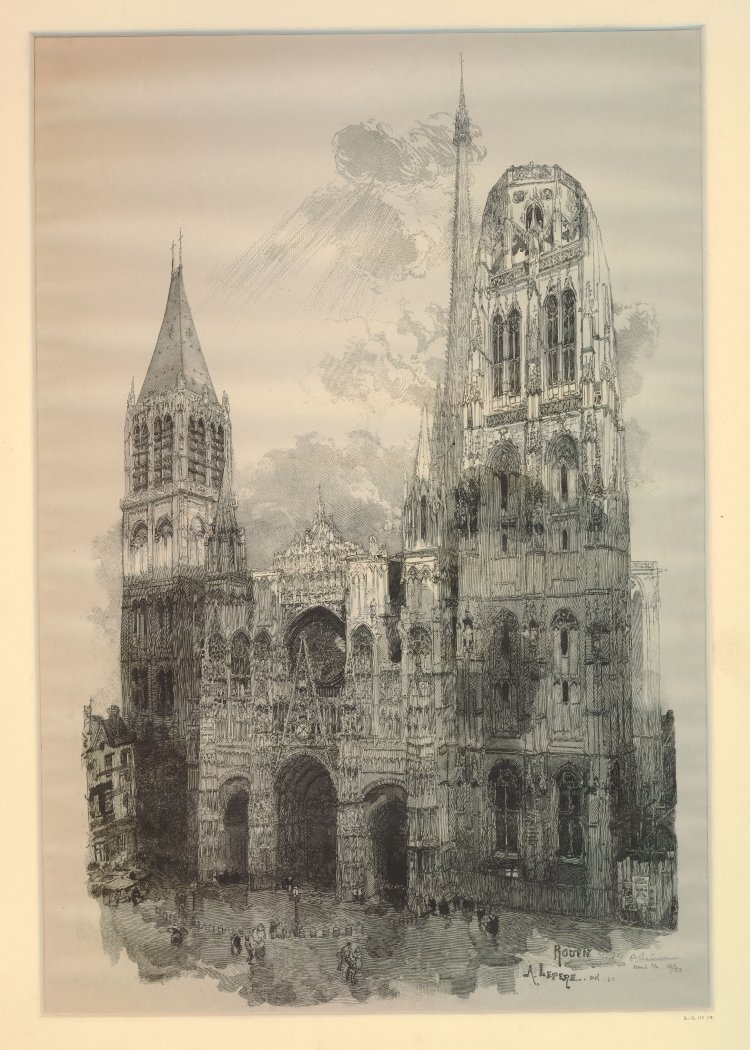
View of thefaçade of Rouen Cathedral, seen from the right, wood engraving- British Museum

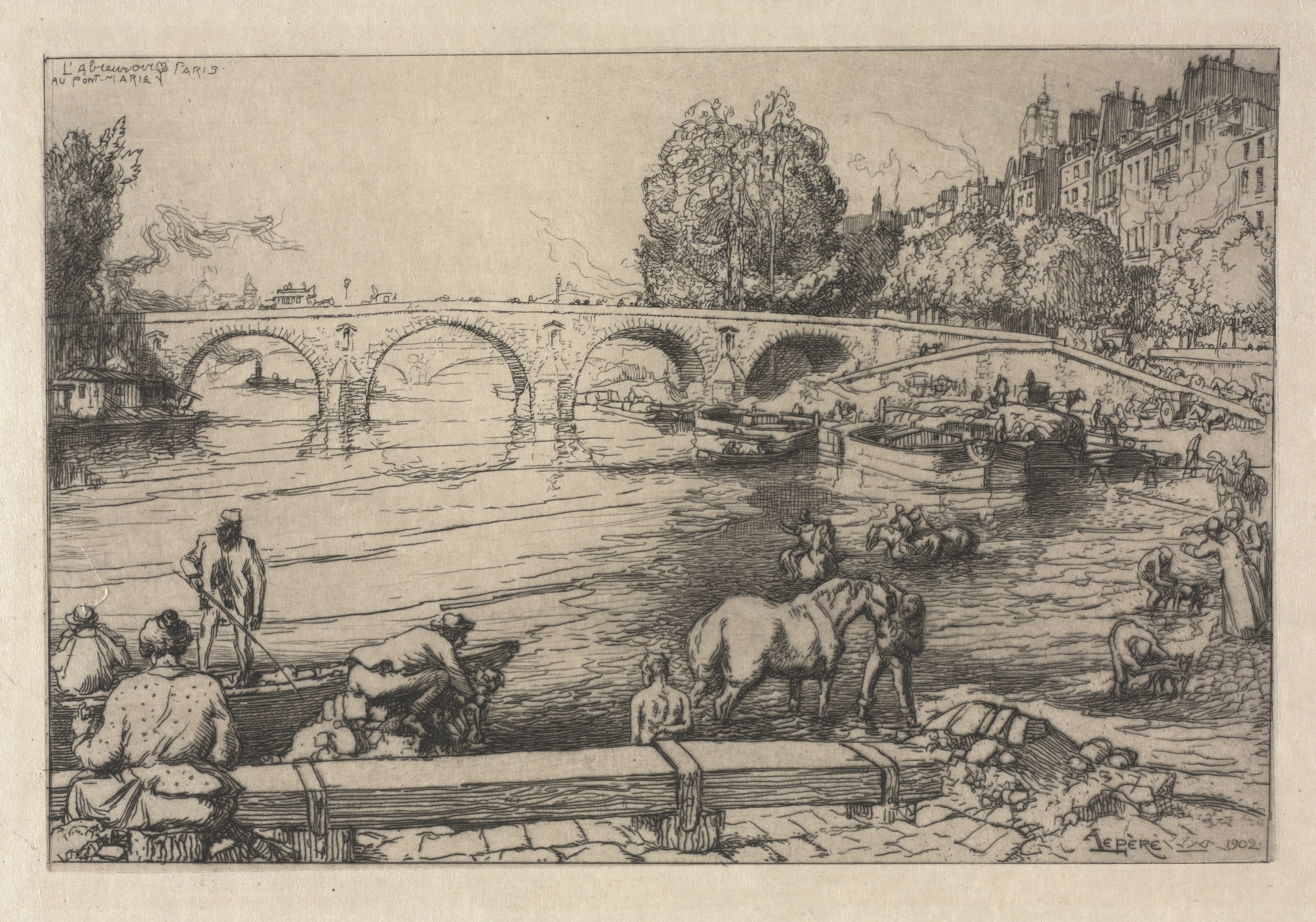
The Watering Place at Marie Bridge (1902)

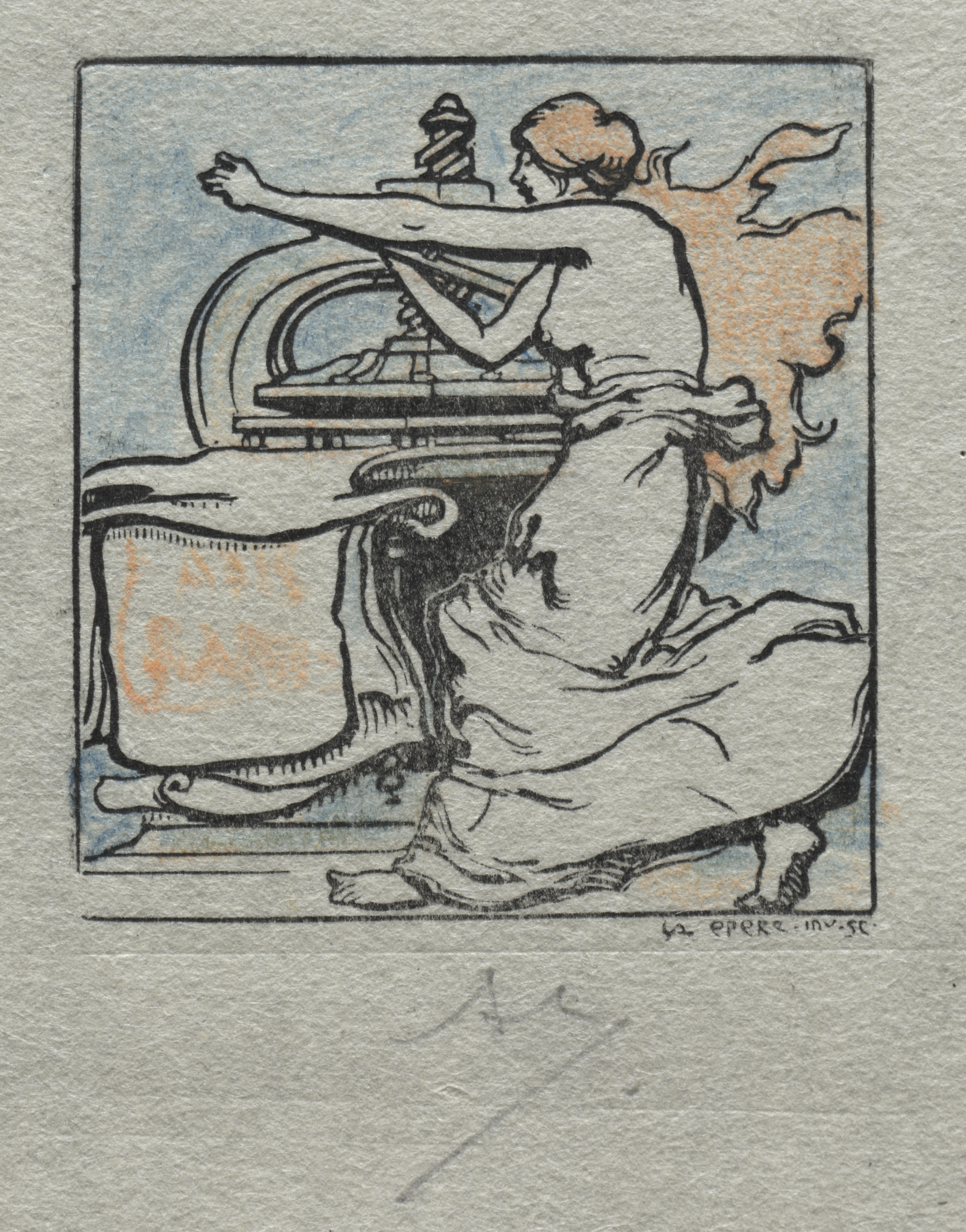
The printer- estampe: Woodcut with hand coloring

Storm on the Island of Yeu - Watercolor and gouache over black crayon. (1916)
