= Stubbins (surname) =

Stubbins is a surname and occasional given name. Notable people with the name include:

- Albert Stubbins (1919–2002), English footballer
- Hugh Stubbins (1912–2006), American architect
- Phil Stubbins (born 1962), English-born Australian football player and manager
- Stubbins Ffirth (1784–1820), American trainee doctor

== Other uses ==
- George E. Stubbins House, in Britt, Iowa
- KlingStubbins, American corporation
