= Senf =

Senf is a surname. Notable people with the surname include:

- Carol Senf, American academic
- Rebecca Senf (born 1972), American writer and curator
- Margit Senf (born 1945), East German pair skater

== See also ==
- Sen (surname)
- Senn
