= Sehn =

Sehn or SEHN may refer to:

- Eric Sehn (born 1984), Canadian diver
- Jan Sehn (1909–1965), Polish lawyer and professor
- Science & Environmental Health Network (SEHN), a non-profit organization founded in 1994

== See also ==
- Sen (surname)
- Senn
- Seon (Korean name)
