= Senn retractor =

Surgical instrument

Senn retractors are double-ended retractors used in surgical procedures. One end is typically L-shaped, and the other has three bent prongs. The pronged ends come in sharp and dull tips. They are regularly used in hand and foot surgeries. The Senn retractor design was first described in the literature by Dr. Nicholas Senn, head of surgery at Rush Medical College.

== See also ==
- Instruments used in general surgery
