= Self-experimentation in medicine =

Practice of researchers trying procedures on themselves

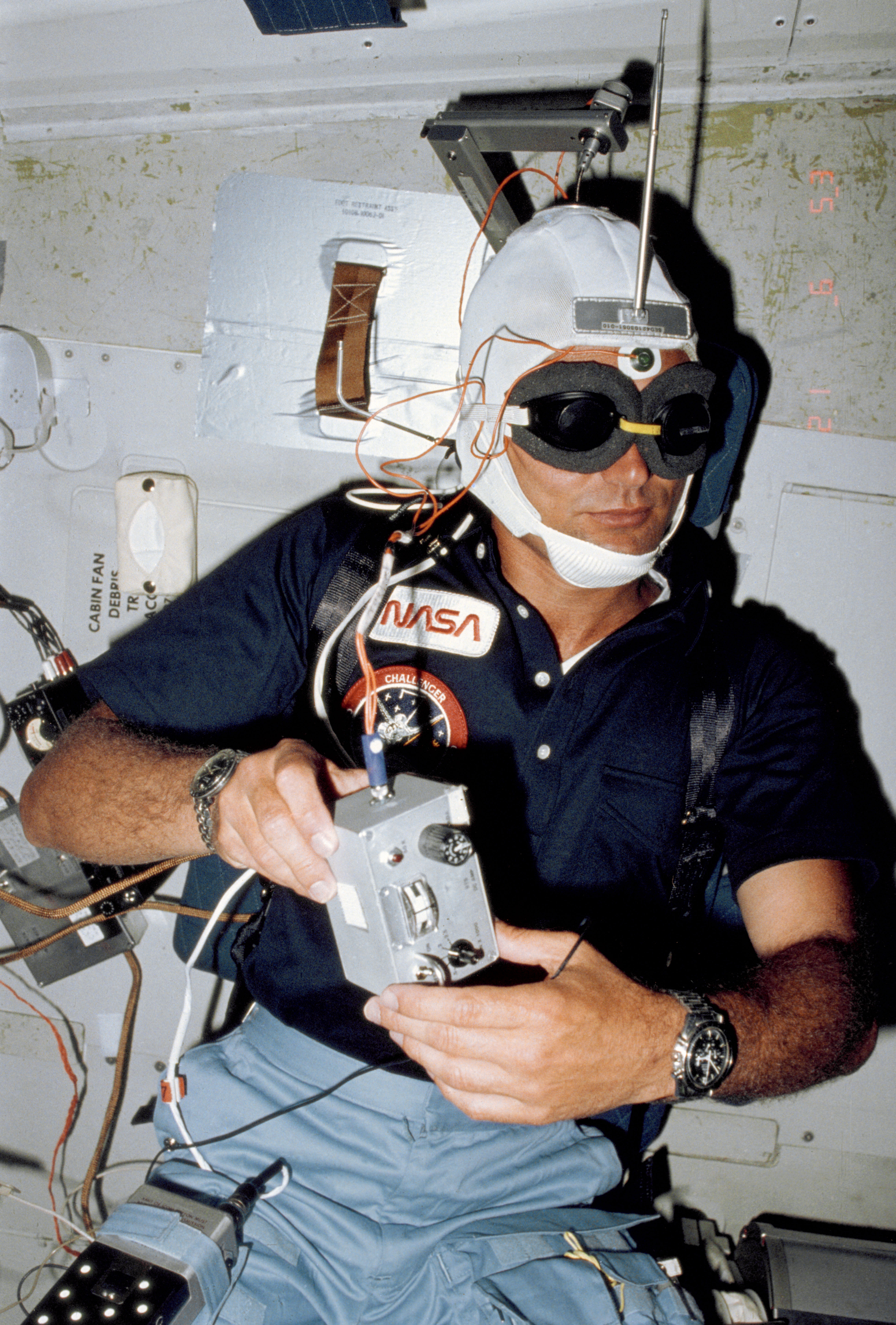
Norman Thagard self-experimenting aboard the Space Shuttle. He conducted physiological experiments on personnel during the STS-7 mission.

Self-experimentation refers to scientific experimentation in which the experimenter conducts the experiment on themself. Often this means that the designer, operator, subject, analyst, and user or reporter of the experiment are all the same. Self-experimentation has a long and well-documented history in medicine which continues to the present. Some of these experiments have been very valuable and shed new and often unexpected insights into different areas of medicine.

There are many motivations for self-experiment. These include the wish to get results quickly and avoid the need for a formal organisational structure, to take the ethical stance of taking the same risk as volunteers, or just a desire to do good for humanity. Other ethical issues include whether a researcher should self-experiment because another volunteer would not get the same benefit as the researcher will get, and the question of whether informed consent of a volunteer can truly be given by those outside a research program.

A number of distinguished scientists have undertaken self-experimentation, including at least five Nobel laureates; in several cases, the prize was awarded for findings the self-experimentation made possible. Many experiments were dangerous; various people exposed themselves to pathogenic, toxic or radioactive materials. Some self-experimenters, like Jesse Lazear and Daniel Alcides Carrión, died in the course of their research. Notable examples of self-researchers occur in many fields; infectious disease (Jesse Lazear: yellow fever, Max von Pettenkofer: cholera), vaccine research and development (Daniel Zagury: AIDS, Tim Friede: Snakebite), cancer (Nicholas Senn, Jean-Louis-Marc Alibert), blood (Karl Landsteiner, William J. Harrington), and pharmacology (Albert Hofmann, and many others). Research has not been limited to disease and drugs. John Stapp tested the limits of human deceleration, Humphry Davy breathed nitrous oxide, and Nicholas Senn pumped hydrogen into his gastrointestinal tract to test the utility of the method for diagnosing perforations.

== Definition ==
There is no formal definition of what constitutes self-experimentation. A strict definition might limit it to cases where there is a single-subject experiment and the experimenter performs the procedure on himself. A looser definition might include cases where the experimenters put themselves amongst the volunteers for the experiment. According to S. C. Gandevia of the University of New South Wales, who was looking at the question from the perspective of ethics, it is only self-experiment if the would-be self-experimenter would be named as an author on any subsequent published paper. That is, the person who would receive the academic credit for the experiment must also be the subject of it.

== Motivations ==
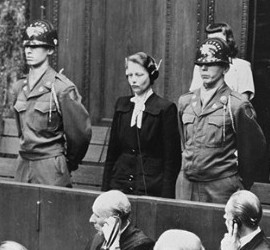
Dr. Herta Oberheuser being sentenced at Nuremberg

There are many reasons experimenters decide to self-test, but amongst the most fundamental is the ethical principle that the experimenter should not subject the participants in the experiment to any procedure they would not be willing to undertake themselves. This idea was first codified in the Nuremberg Code in 1947, which was a result of the trials of Nazi doctors at the Nuremberg trials accused of murdering and torturing victims in valueless experiments. Several of these doctors were hanged. Point five of the Nuremberg Code requires that no experiment should be conducted that is dangerous to the subjects unless the experimenters themselves also take part. The Nuremberg Code has influenced medical experiment codes of practice around the world, as has the exposure of experiments that have since failed to follow it such as the notorious Tuskegee syphilis experiment.

Critics of self-experimenters point to other less savoury motivations such as simple self-aggrandisement. Some scientists have resorted to self-experiment to avoid the "red tape" of seeking permission from the relevant ethics committee of their institution. Werner Forssmann was so determined to proceed with his self-experiment that he continued with it even after permission had been denied. He was twice dismissed for this activity, but the importance of his work was eventually recognised in a Nobel Prize. Some researchers believe that self-experimentation is not permitted. However, this is not true, at least in the United States where the same rules apply regardless of who the subject of the experiment is.

Self-experimentation is also criticised for the risk of over-enthusiastic researchers, eager to prove a point, not accurately noting the results. Against this it is argued by those supporting self-experiment that medically trained persons are in a better position to understand and record symptoms, and self-experiment is usually at the very early stage of a program before volunteers have been recruited.

A wish to commit suicide is sometimes offered as a reason for self-experimentation. However, Lawrence K. Altman, author of Who Goes First?: The Story of Self-experimentation in Medicine, while acknowledging that this may sometimes occur, after extensive research could find only one verified case of attempted suicide by self-experimentation. This was Nobel Prize winner Élie Metchnikoff, who, in 1881, suffering from depression, injected himself with relapsing fever. This was his second suicide attempt, but according to his wife, Olga, he chose this method of death so that it would be of benefit to medicine. However, Metchnikoff survived and in 1892 also self-experimented with cholera, but this is not thought to have been a suicide attempt.

Perhaps the noblest motivation is the simple altruistic desire to do something of benefit to humanity regardless of the risks. There most certainly are risks, as Jesse Lazear found to his cost when he died of yellow fever after deliberately infecting himself. Max von Pettenkofer, after ingesting cholera bacteria said:

Even if I had deceived myself and the experiment endangered my life, I would have looked Death quietly in the eye for mine would have been no foolish or cowardly suicide; I would have died in the service of science like a soldier on the field of honor.

— Max von Pettenkofer

According to Ian Kerridge, professor of bioethics at the University of Sydney, the most common reason for undertaking self-experimentation is not so much anything noble, but rather "an insatiable scientific curiosity and a need to participate closely in their own research".

== Ethics ==
As already mentioned, it is an ethical principle that the researcher should not inflict on volunteers anything that the researcher would not be willing to do to themself, but the researcher is not always a suitable, or even possible, subject for the experiment. For instance, the researcher may be the wrong sex if the research is into hormone treatment for women, or may be too old, or too young. The ethical question for the researchers is would they agree to the experiment if they were in the same position as the volunteers?

Another issue that can lead researchers not to take part is whether the researcher would stand to gain any benefit from taking part in the experiment. It is an ethical principle that volunteers must stand to gain some benefit from the research, even if that is only a remote future possibility of treatment being found for a disease that they only have a small chance of contracting. Tests on experimental drugs are sometimes conducted on sufferers of an untreatable condition. If the researcher does not have that condition then there can be no possible benefit to them personally. For instance, Ronald C. Desrosiers in responding to why he did not test an AIDS vaccine he was developing on himself said that he was not at risk of AIDS so could not possibly benefit. Against that, the early stages of testing a new drug are usually focused merely on the safety of the substance, rather than any benefits it may have. Healthy individuals are required for this stage, not volunteers suffering from the target condition, so if the researcher is healthy, he or she is a potential candidate for testing. An issue peculiar to AIDS vaccine research is that the test will leave HIV antibodies in the volunteers blood, causing the person to show HIV positive when tested even if they have never been in contact with an HIV carrier. This could cause a number of social problems for the volunteers (including any self-testers) such as issues with life insurance.

The ethics of informed consent is relevant to self-experimentation. Informed consent is the principle that the volunteers in the experiment should fully understand the procedure that is going to take place, be aware of all the risks involved, and give their consent to taking part in the experiment beforehand. The principle of informed consent was first enacted in the U.S. Army's research into Yellow fever in Cuba in 1901. However, there was no general or official guidance at this time. That remained the case until the yellow fever program was referenced in the drafting of the Nuremberg Code. This was further developed in the Declaration of Helsinki in 1964 by the World Medical Association which has since become the foundation for ethics committees' guidelines.

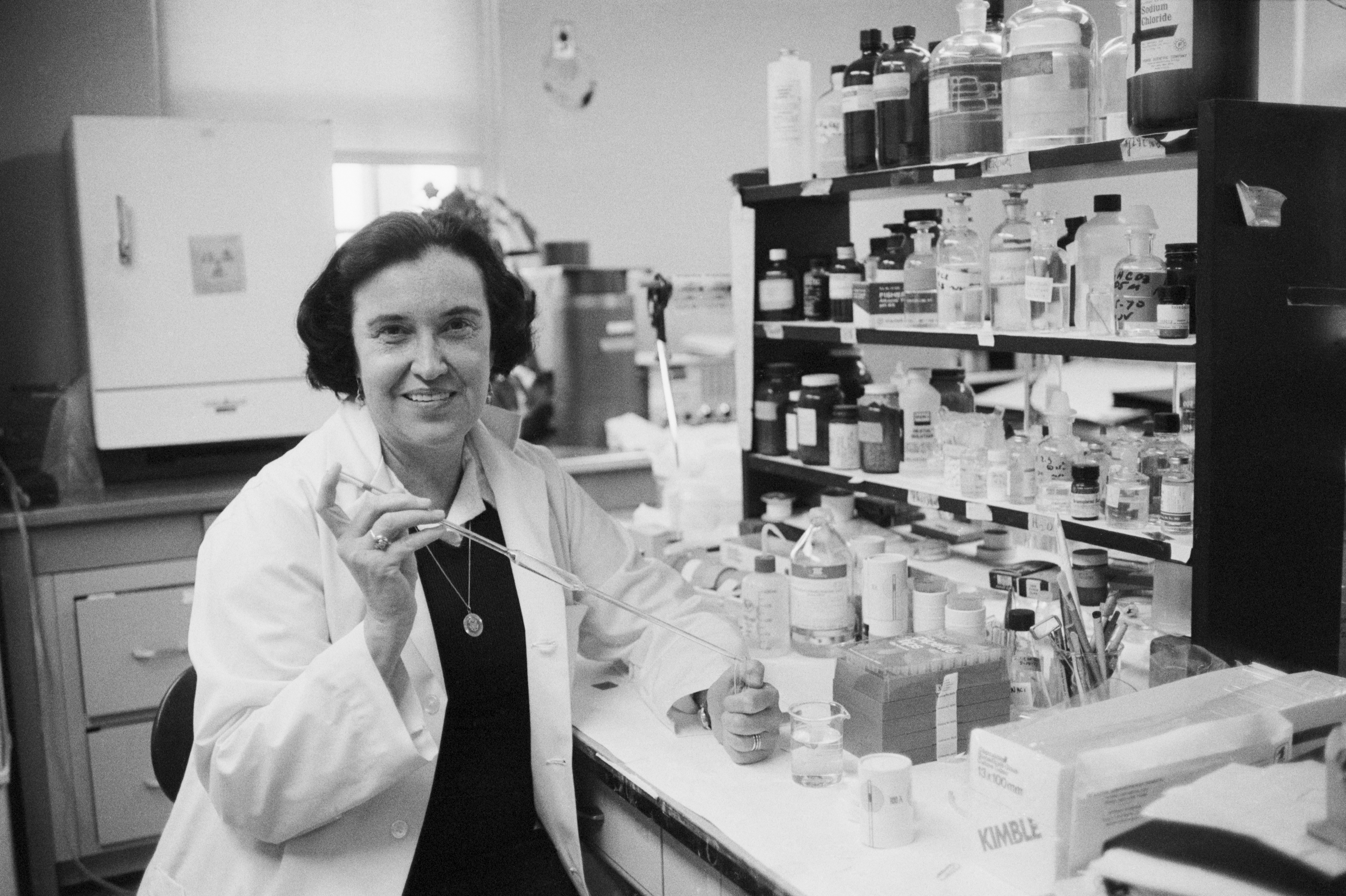
Rosalyn Yalow at the Bronx VA Hospital in 1977

Some researchers believe that experimental research is too complex for the general public ever to be able to give proper informed consent. One such researcher is Eugene G. Laforet, who believes that the researchers taking part in the experiment themselves is more valuable to the volunteers than a legal consent form. Another is 1977 Nobel Prize winner Rosalyn S. Yalow who said "In our laboratory we always used ourselves because we are the only ones who can give truly informed consent." On the other side of the coin, there is the possibility that members of a research team may be coerced into participating by peer pressure.

The question of who should be first to try the procedure in a new experiment is an ethical one. However, according to Altman it is not a question that can successfully be legislated. A law requiring self-test would force researchers to take risks that may sometimes be inappropriate. A code forbidding it might inhibit valuable discoveries.

Self-experimentation has a role in medical education. Although no longer encouraged, in former times it was perfectly standard to expect medical students to try for themselves the drugs they were going to be prescribing. Charles-Édouard Brown-Séquard, whose own self-experiments led him to the concept of what are now called hormones, was a nineteenth century proponent of the practice:

I will suggest that you should study upon yourselves the effects of the most valuable remedies. I well believe that you will never know fully the action of certain remedies, if you have not ascertained, on your own person, what effects they produce on the brain, the eye, the ear, the nerves, the muscles, and the principal viscera.

— Charles-Édouard Brown-Séquard

== Value ==
Self-experimentation has value in rapidly obtaining the first results. In some cases, such as with Forssmann's experiments done in defiance of official permission, results may be obtained that would never otherwise have come to light. However, self-experiment lacks the statistical validity of a larger experiment. It is not possible to generalise from an experiment on a single person. For instance, a single successful blood transfusion does not indicate, as we now know from the work of Karl Landsteiner, that all such transfusions between any two random people will also be successful. Likewise, a single failure does not absolutely prove that a procedure is worthless. Psychological issues such as confirmation bias and the placebo effect are unavoidable in a single-person self-experiment where it is not possible to put scientific controls in place.

Such concerns do not apply so much if the self-experimenter is just one of many volunteers (as long as the self-experimenter is not also responsible for recording the results) but his or her presence still has value. As noted above, this can reassure the other participants. It also acts as a check on the experimenter when considering whether the experiment is ethical or dangerous.

== Notable examples ==
=== Anaesthesia ===
Dentist Horace Wells made multiple experiments with nitrous oxide, diethyl ether, and chloroform while trying to determine their uses as anaesthetics. The first, conducted in 1844, consisted of having his assistant John Riggs dose him with nitrous oxide and then extract one of his teeth. His later self-experimentation of ether and chloroform took place in 1848, and he eventually became addicted to chloroform due to excessive use. He inhaled chloroform as an anaesthetic shortly before committing suicide on January 24, 1848.

Lidocaine, the first amino amide–type local anaesthetic, was first synthesized under the name xylocaine by Swedish chemist Nils Löfgren in 1943. His colleague Bengt Lundqvist performed the first injection anaesthesia experiments on himself.

=== Asthma ===
Roger Altounyan developed the use of sodium cromoglycate as a remedy for asthma, based on khella, a traditional Middle Eastern remedy, with experiments on himself.

=== Blood ===
==== ABO blood group system ====
Dr. Karl Landsteiner's discovery of the ABO blood group system in 1900 was based on an analysis of blood samples from six members of his laboratory staff, including himself.

==== Thrombocytopenia ====
In the Harrington–Hollingsworth experiment in 1950, William J. Harrington performed an exchange blood transfusion between himself and a thrombocytopenic patient, discovering the immune basis of idiopathic thrombocytopenic purpura and providing evidence for the existence of autoimmunity.

=== Cancer ===
In 1901, Nicholas Senn investigated whether cancer was contagious. He surgically inserted under his skin a piece of cancerous lymph node from a patient with cancer of the lip. After two weeks, the transplant started to fade and Senn concluded that cancer is not contagious.

Much earlier, in 1808, Jean-Louis-Marc Alibert injected himself with a discharge from breast cancer. The site of injection became inflamed, but did not develop cancer.

Gerhard Domagk, in 1949, injected himself with sterilised extract of human cancer in an attempt to prove that immunisation against cancer was possible.

In 2024, Beata Halassy, a 50-year-old virologist with a history of recurrent triple-negative breast cancer (TNBC), conducted a self-experiment using intratumoral injections of research-grade viruses she prepared in her own laboratory. Her cancer was first treated with mastectomy and chemotherapy in 2016, but a local recurrence in 2018 left a small residual seroma. By 2020, what was thought of as a "seroma" had progressed into a 2 cm tumor infiltrating the pectoral muscle. Facing this invasive recurrence, she initially injected the Edmonston-Zagreb measles vaccine strain (MeV) directly into the tumor, later switching to the vesicular stomatitis virus Indiana strain (VSV). Her oncologists were informed of her intent and agreed to monitor her condition, prepared to intervene if necessary. This unconventional and experimental neoadjuvant oncolytic virotherapy led to significant tumor reduction, enabling a less invasive surgical resection. After that she completed a year of adjuvant trastuzumab therapy and remained recurrence-free 45 months after the oncolytic virotherapy.

=== Infectious diseases and vaccines ===
COVID-19

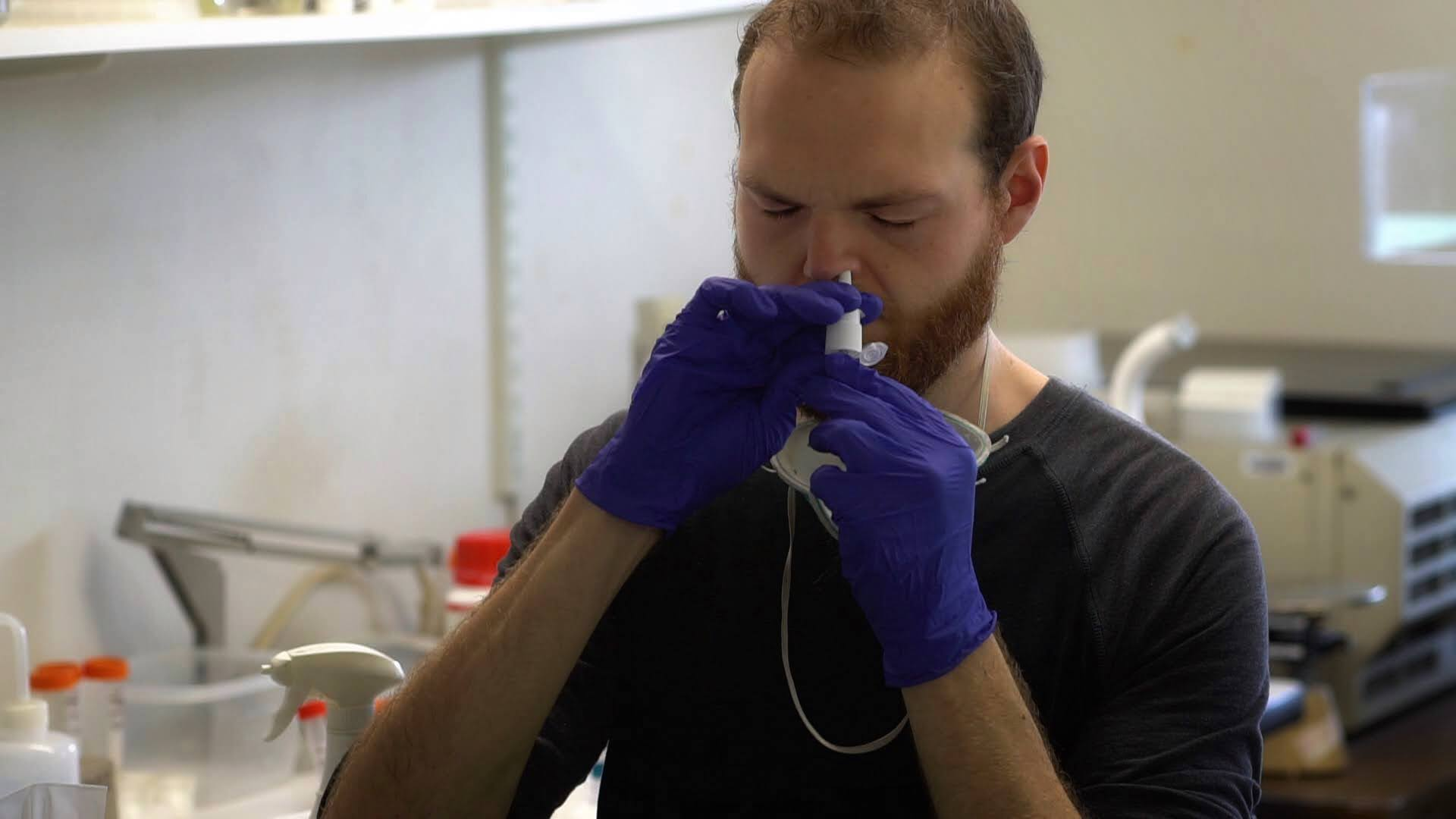
Alexander Hoekstra self-administering an experimental, intranasal COVID-19 vaccine developed by Rapid Deployment Vaccine Collaborative in 2020

In February 2020, Huang Jinhai, an immunologist at Tianjin University, claimed that he had taken four doses of a COVID-19 vaccine developed in his lab even before it had been tested in animals.

In March 2020, the Rapid Deployment Vaccine Collaborative (also known as RaDVaC) developed, produced, and published technical specifications for a modular, intranasal COVID-19 vaccine. Numerous scientists working directly and indirectly on the group's vaccine development also began self-experimentation using the project's multiple vaccine candidates.

In March 2020, Hans-Georg Rammensee, professor of immunology at University of Tübingen and co-founder of CureVac began testing a COVID-19 vaccine on himself.

In May 2020, Alexander Gintsburg, director of the Gamaleya Research Institute of Epidemiology and Microbiology announced that several vaccine specialists had begun self-experimentation with the Sputnik V COVID-19 vaccine.

==== AIDS vaccine ====
Daniel Zagury, in 1986, was the first to test his proposed AIDS vaccine.

==== Bartonellosis ====
Daniel Alcides Carrión, in 1885, infected himself from the pus in the purple wart (verruga peruana) of a female patient. Carrión developed an acute form of bartonellosis now known as Carrion's disease or Oroya fever. This is a rare disease found only in Peru and certain other parts of South America. He kept detailed notes of his condition and succeeded in showing through this self-experiment that the chronic and acute forms were the same disease. He died from the disease after several weeks. A student who had assisted Carrion in carrying out this work was arrested and charged with murder, but later released.

==== Cholera ====
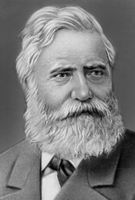
Max von Pettenkofer

Max von Pettenkofer, in October 1892, drank bouillon deliberately infected with a large dose of cholera bacteria. Pettenkofer was attempting to disprove the theory of Robert Koch that the disease was caused by the bacteria Vibrio cholerae alone. Pettenkofer also took bicarbonate of soda to counter a claim by Koch that stomach acid killed the bacteria. Pettenkofer escaped with mild symptoms and claimed success, but the modern view is that he did indeed have cholera, luckily just a mild case, and possibly had some immunity from a previous episode.

==== Dysentery ====
S.O. Levinson with H.J. Shaugnessy – and others between 1942 and 1947 – injected themselves with a vaccine against dysentery. The vaccine had previously been tested on mice, which had all died within minutes, and the effect on humans was completely unknown. The experimenters survived but suffered strong side effects.

==== Gastritis and peptic ulcers ====
===== Helicobacter pylori =====
In 1984 a Western Australian scientist, Dr Barry Marshall, discovered the link between Helicobacter pylori (at that time known as Campylobacter pylori) and gastritis. This was based on a series of self-experiments that involved gastroscopy and biopsy, ingestion of H. pylori, regastroscopy and biopsy and subsequent treatment with tinidazole. His only option was self-experimentation: ethical measures forbade him from administering H. pylori to any other person. In 2005, Marshall and his long-time collaborator Robin Warren were awarded Nobel Prize in Physiology or Medicine, "for their discovery of the bacterium Helicobacter pylori and its role in gastritis and peptic ulcer disease".

Marshall's experiment debunked the long-held belief of the medical profession that stress was the cause of gastritis. This cleared the way for the development of antibiotic treatments for gastritis and peptic ulcers and a new line of research into the likely role of H. pylori in stomach cancer.

===== Campylobacter jejuni =====
Marshall's investigation was preceded by David A. Robinson who, in 1980, ingested Campylobacter jejuni, a bacterium found in cow's milk, to investigate whether gastritis could be caused by drinking milk infected with C. jejuni. Robinson became sick as a result. Robinson needed to do a human experiment because the alternative, testing on cows, was not viable as infected cows frequently do not become ill.

==== Malaria ====
Tu YouYou and two colleagues tested qinghaosu on themselves before offering the treatment to patients.

==== Staphylococcus ====
Gail Monroe Dack (1901–1976), a former president of the American Society for Microbiology, gave himself food poisoning by eating cake tainted with Staphylococcus.

==== Syphilis ====
Constantin Levaditi (1874–1953) injected himself with spirochaete from rabbits suffering from syphilis but did not contract the disease himself.

==== Yellow fever ====
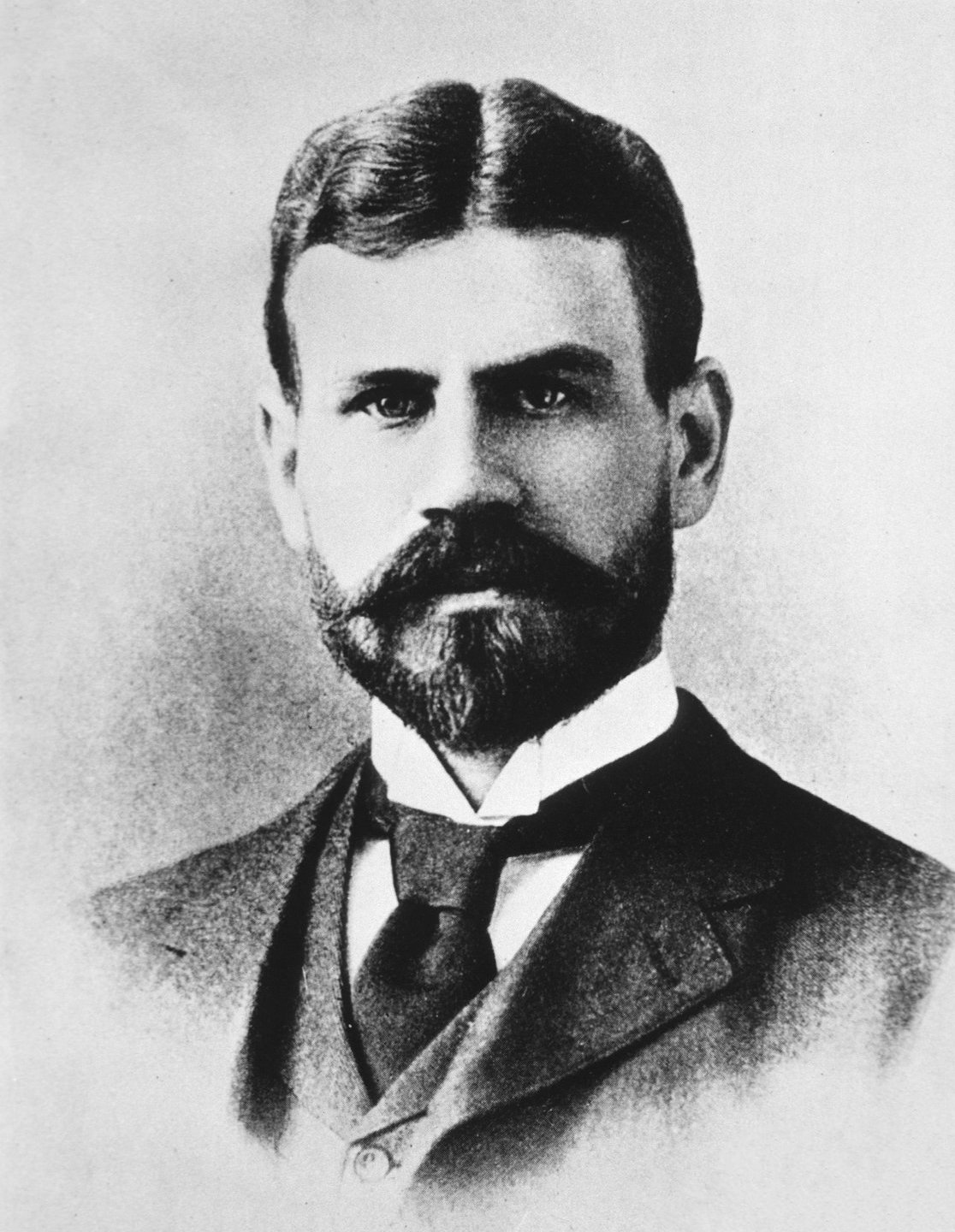
Jesse Lazear

In Cuba, U.S. Army doctors from Walter Reed's research team infected themselves with yellow fever including James Carroll, Aristides Agramonte, and, most notably, Jesse Lazear, who died from yellow fever complications in 1900. These efforts ultimately resulted in proof of the mosquito-borne nature of yellow fever transmission and saved countless lives. Stubbins Ffirth had investigated the contagious nature of the disease at the end of the 18th century.

There was an unsuccessful campaign to award a Nobel Prize to Reed's team. Lazear, in any event, could not be awarded the prize because it is never given posthumously. However, a Nobel Prize was awarded to a later yellow fever researcher and self-experimenter, Max Theiler who, in 1951, developed the first yellow fever vaccine and was the first to try it.

==== Trachoma ====
Anatolii Al'bertovich Shatkin, in 1961, injected trachoma virus into the conjunctival sac of his eye and rapidly developed trachoma. He did not begin treatment of the condition for 26 days.

==== Schistosomiasis ====
In July 1944, physician researcher Claude Barlow ingested over 200 schistosome worms to carry back to the United States from Egypt to study whether domestic snails could become infected and introduce the disease into the United States. Attempts to send infected snails, the intermediate host, by mail had been unsuccessful. He refused treatment, despite being desperately ill by December, so as not to lose the eggs for further study. He finally passed 4,630 eggs in his semen and 200 eggs in his urine. The U.S. government decided not to use the eggs, so his self-sacrifice was to no avail. It was November 1945 before he finally cleared all the parasites, after treatment with tartar emetic.

=== Non-infectious diseases ===
==== Anaemia ====
William Bosworth Castle, in 1926, ate minced raw beef every morning, regurgitated it an hour later, and then fed it to his patients suffering from pernicious anaemia. Castle was testing his theory that there was an intrinsic factor produced in a normal stomach that hugely increased the uptake of the extrinsic factor (now identified as vitamin B_{12}), lack of which leads to pernicious anaemia. Beef is a good source of B_{12}, but patients did not respond with beef alone. Castle reasoned they lacked production of intrinsic factor and he could provide it from his own stomach. While Castle was not the recipient of this treatment, his story is included in Who Goes First?: The Story of Self-experimentation in Medicine and is considered a self-experimenter by the author. Victor Herbert made himself folate deficient to prove the deficiency causes pernicious anemia; the special diet also resulted in potassium and iron deficiencies.

==== Hyperthyroidism ====
Elliott Cutler (1888–1947) took sufficient thyroid extract to give himself hyperthyroidism and enable him to study the effect of the condition on kidney function.

==== Scurvy ====
In London in June 1769, William Stark aimed to find the cause of scurvy with a series of dietary experiments on himself. He devised a series of 24 dietary experiments and kept accurate measures of temperature and weather conditions, the weights of all food and water he consumed, and the weight of all daily excretions. He started with a basic diet of bread and water and became 'dull and listless'. When he recovered, he resumed experimenting by adding various foods, one at a time - olive oil, milk, roast goose, and others. After two months, he had symptoms of scurvy. By November 1769 he was living on nothing but honey puddings and Cheshire cheese. He considered testing fresh fruits and vegetables when he died in February 1770.

=== Drugs ===
==== Cocaine ====
In 1936, Edwin Katskee took a very large dose of cocaine. He attempted to write notes on his office wall, but these became increasingly illegible as the experiment proceeded. Katskee was found dead the next morning.

==== Disulfiram ====
In 1945, during the German occupation of Denmark, Erik Jacobsen and Jens Hald at the Danish drug company Medicinalco (which had a group of enthusiastic self-experimenters that called itself the "Death Battalion") were exploring the possible use of disulfiram to treat intestinal parasites, and in the course of testing it on themselves, accidentally discovered its effects (Disulfiram-alcohol reaction) when alcohol is ingested, which led several years later to the drug called Antabuse.

==== Furan ====
Chauncey D. Leake, in 1930, took furan as a possible substitute for aspirin but it just gave him a splitting headache and painful urination that lasted three days.

==== Grapefruit juice ====
David G. Bailey, in 1989, was researching the effects of drinking alcohol while taking the then-experimental drug felodipine. It was usual in this kind of research to mix the alcohol with orange juice but Bailey did not like the taste of this drink so used grapefruit juice instead. Bailey found that there was three times more felodipine in his, and fellow researchers', blood than had been reported by other scientists using orange juice. It was later found that grapefruit juice suppresses an enzyme responsible for breaking down a large number of different drugs.

==== Ibuprofen ====
As part of the team who developed ibuprofen in the 1960s, Stewart Adams initially tested it on a hangover.

==== Psychoactive drugs ====
Friedrich Sertürner isolated morphine from opium in 1804. Morphine was the first-ever alkaloid isolated from any plant. Sertürner wanted to prove his findings to his colleague with a public experiment on himself and three other friends.

Jacques-Joseph Moreau published his study "Du Hachisch et de l'aliénation mentale" in 1845. He self-experimented with hashish and observed its varying effects on other people. Moreau insisted that researchers should self-experiment to gain understanding of the altered states of consciousness produced by psychoactive substances.

Psychopharmacologist Arthur Heffter isolated mescaline from the peyote cactus in 1897 and conducted experiments on its effects by comparing the effects of peyote and mescaline on himself.

Albert Hofmann discovered the psychedelic properties of LSD in 1943 by accidentally absorbing it and later intentionally ingesting it to verify that the effects were caused by LSD. He was also the first to isolate psilocybin from psilocybin mushrooms and self-experimented with it to prove it to be the active principle of psilocybin mushroom's psychoactive effects.

Timothy Leary took LSD and was a well-known proponent of the social use of the drug in the 1960s.

Alexander Shulgin synthesized and self-experimented with a variety of psychoactive drugs, notably MDMA. He developed a system known as the Shulgin Rating Scale for his research group to use during the self-experimentation of psychedelics.

=== Gases ===
==== Hydrogen ====
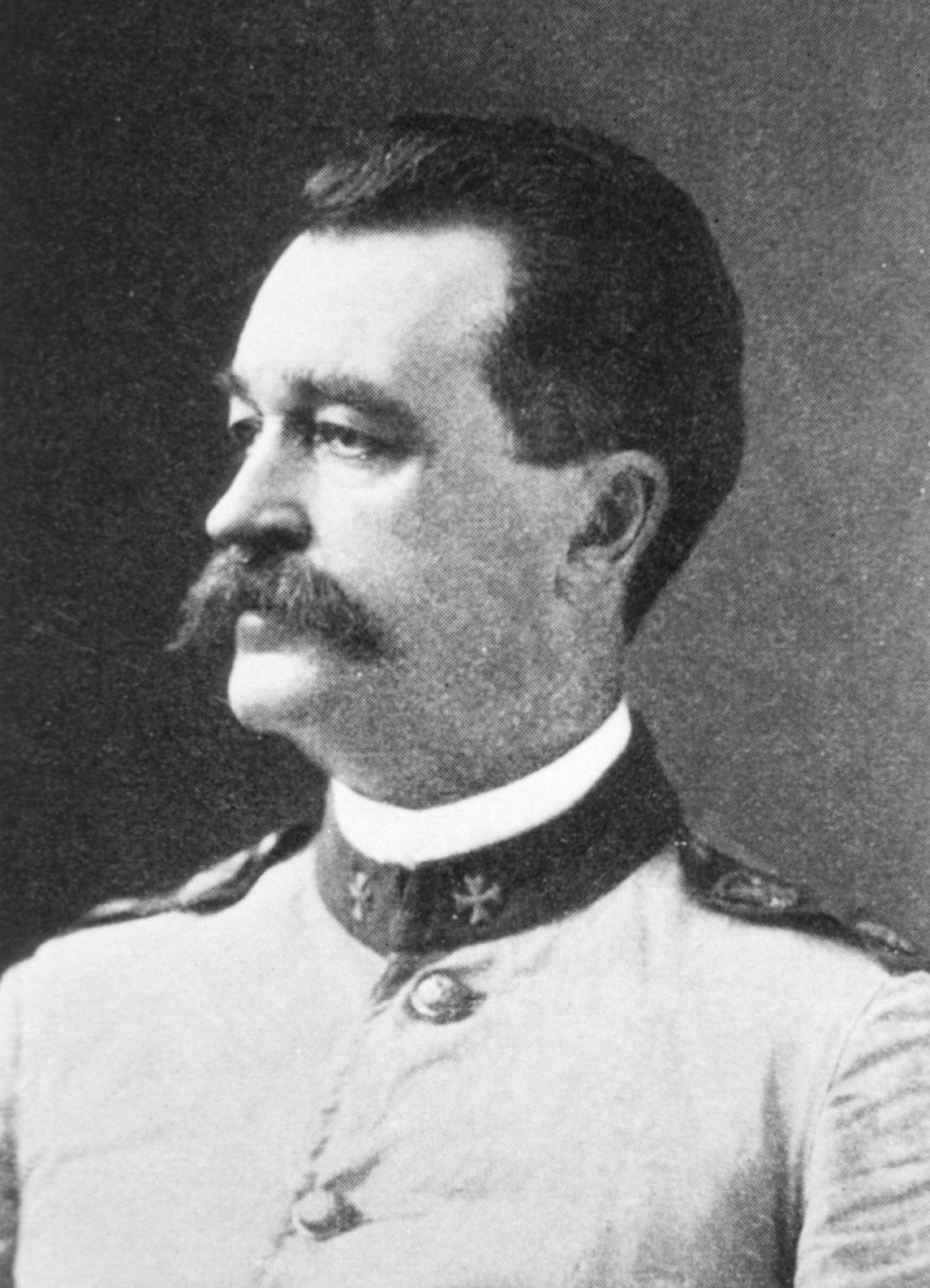
Nicholas Senn

Around 1886, Nicholas Senn pumped nearly six litres of hydrogen through his anus. Senn used a rubber balloon holding four US gallons connected to a rubber tube inserted in the anus. An assistant sealed the tube by squeezing the anus against it. The hydrogen was inserted by squeezing the balloon while monitoring the pressure on a manometer. Senn had previously carried out this experiment on dogs to the point of rupturing the intestine. Senn was a pioneer of using this technique to determine if the bullet in gunshot wounds had penetrated the intestinal tract. In experiments on gunshot wounds to dogs, Senn verified that the gas escaping from the wound was hydrogen by setting light to it.

Reports that Senn used helium in this experiment are almost certainly erroneous. Helium was first detected on Earth in 1882, but not isolated until 1895, and extractable reserves not found until 1903.

==== Synthetic gases ====
Humphry Davy self-experimented with breathing of several different gases, most notably nitrous oxide.

=== Genes ===
Self-experimentation with gene therapies have been reported. Every gene therapy has a unique risk of harm, including the risk associated with the gene delivery method (i.e., the particular viral vector or form of transfection) that is used and the risk associated with a specific genetic modification. Examples of potential risks for some gene therapies include tissue damage and an immune response to foreign DNA, among many others.

In 2017, biohacker Jo Zayner publicly injected herself with CRISPR, a gene-editing technology, during a biotechnology conference in San Francisco. Zayner targeted the myostatin gene, which encodes a protein that inhibits muscle growth, acting as a natural regulator to prevent excessive muscle development. By using CRISPR technology, she aimed to "knock out" this gene in the muscle cells of her forearm. The intent was to disrupt the gene's function, potentially allowing for localized muscle growth.

=== Pain ===
Thomas Lewis and Jonas Kellgren studied pain in the 1930s. To do this, they injected hypertonic saline into various parts of their own bodies.

In 1983, entomologist Justin O. Schmidt released a paper detailing what he called the Schmidt sting pain index based on his own personal reactions to the stings of various insects of the Hymenoptera order, rating them on a range from 0 to 4. His 1990 revised paper covered 78 such species.

=== Physical experiments ===
==== Hanging ====
In the early 1900s Nicolae Minovici, a professor of forensic science in Bucharest, undertook a series of experiments into hanging. At first he put the noose around his neck while lying down and had an assistant put tension on the rope. He then moved on to full suspension by the neck. Finally, he attempted suspension with a slipping hangman's knot, but the pain was too great for him to continue. He could not swallow for a month. Minovici was determined to surpass a record set by Dr. Fleichmann of Erlangen, who in 1832, self-asphyxiated for two minutes. However, Minovici could not get close to this and disbelieved Fleichmann.

Minovici and Fleichmann are not the only ones to self-experiment with strangulation. Graeme Hammond, a doctor in New York, tried it in 1882. Francis Bacon described an even earlier occasion in 1623 when the self-experimenter stepped off a stool with a rope around his neck, but was unable to regain his footing on the stool without assistance.

==== Rapid acceleration ====
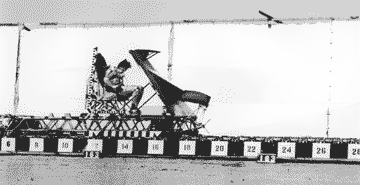
Stapp being brought to a sudden stop in the rocket sled

John Paul Stapp, in 1954, sat in a rocket sled fired along rails in a series of steadily more violent tests. Speeds reached 631 mph, almost the speed of sound. This is a speed record for a manned rail vehicle that still stands today. At the end of the track the sled hit a trough of water that brought it to a rapid stop in around 1.4 seconds. In the most severe test, Stapp underwent an acceleration of 20 g as the rocket engine accelerated the vehicle up to speed and 46 g of deceleration (also a record) as the vehicle was brought to a stop. Stapp suffered numerous injuries in these tests (previous animal tests had shown that limbs could be broken merely by being pulled into the air stream), and several concussions. In the last test his eyes were bloodied as blood vessels burst in his eyes.

These tests were carried out for the US Air Force to determine the forces that pilots could be subjected to and to enable better restraining straps to be designed.

==== Weight balance ====
Santorio Santorio spent a large portion of 30 years living on a platform meticulously measuring his daily weight combined with that of his intake and excretion in an effort to test Galen's theory that respiration occurs through the skin as perspiratio insensibilis (insensible perspiration). The result was the 1614 publication De Statica Medicina ("On Medical Measurements").

=== Poisons ===
==== Black widow spider venom ====
Allan Blair of the University of Alabama, in 1933, deliberately caused a black widow spider to bite him. At the time there was some doubt that the reported symptoms of some victims were the result of a spider bite or some other cause. Blair's experiment was intended to settle the matter. Blair became seriously ill and was hospitalised for several days in great pain, but survived.

==== Hydrogen cyanide ====
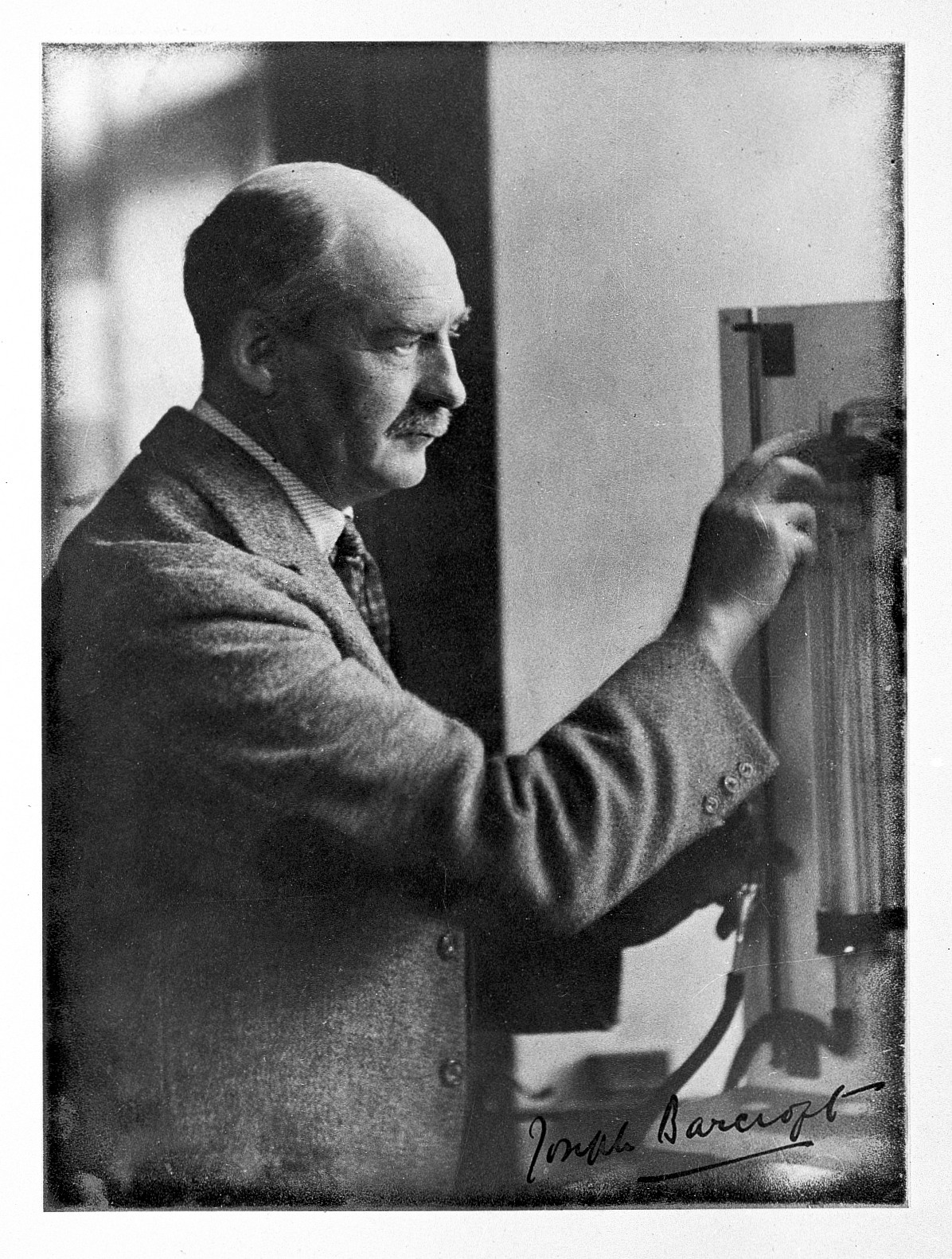
Joseph Barcroft

Joseph Barcroft, in 1917, tested hydrogen cyanide on himself as part of research into poison gas in World War I. He was shut in a chamber with a dog and exposed to the gas. Barcroft continued with the experiment even after the dog went into tetanic convulsions and appeared to die. The experiment was continued for less than two minutes. The next morning the dog was found to be alive and apparently fully recovered. It is not known why dogs are more susceptible to the gas than humans.

- For other self-experiments by Barcroft, see § Temperature and pressure

==== Snake venom ====
Tim Friede created his own vaccine against snakebite using pure venom injections from all four species of mambas, and four cobra species to achieve high immunity. He also survived anaphylactic shock six times during the development of his vaccine. Others have also injected venom to create immunity to snake venom: Bill Haast, Harold Mierkey, Ray Hunter, Joel La Rocque, Herschel Flowers, Martin Crimmins, and Charles Tanner.

==== Tetrachloroethylene and carbon tetrachloride ====
In 1921, Maurice Crowther Hall ingested carbon tetrachloride to test its safety with a view to its possible use as a treatment for hookworm. Hall reported mild side effects. Carbon tetrachloride has since been found to cause acute liver failure. In 1925, Hall ingested tetrachloroethylene (the most common dry cleaning fluid) for the same purpose.

=== Radioactive materials and isotopes ===
Gary Earl Leinbach, in 1972, swallowed radioactive iodine and a knife in a tube for a biopsy. Leinbach was investigating a new way of diagnosing steatorrhea.

Kenneth Gordon Scott, in 1949, inhaled aerosols of plutonium and uranium.

==== Heavy water ====
In 1935, pharmacologist Klaus Hansen drank heavy water to determine its effects on living beings. After his first dose yielded no ill effects, he began taking increasing doses on a daily basis. A follow-up report released a year later confirmed that he was in good health, and he lived to the age of 75.

=== Surgical and psychological procedures ===
==== Cardiac catheterization ====
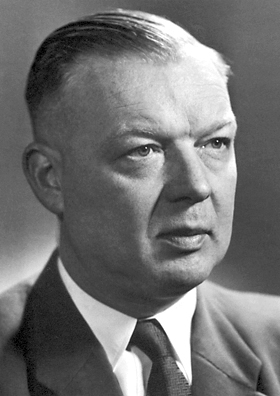
Werner Forssmann

Clinical application of cardiac catheterization began with Werner Forssmann in the 1930s, who inserted a catheter into the brachial vein of his own forearm, guided it fluoroscopically into his right atrium, and took an X-ray picture of it. Forssmann did this procedure without permission. He obtained the assistance of a nurse by deceiving her that she was to be the subject of the experiment. He tied down her arms while inserting the catheter into his own arm, only releasing her at the point it was too late to change, and he needed her assistance. Forssmann was twice fired for carrying out these self-experiments, but shared the Nobel Prize in Physiology or Medicine in 1956 for this achievement. Cardiac catheterization is now a routine procedure in heart surgery.

==== Self-surgery ====
There have been several cases of surgeons operating on themselves, but most often it has been in the nature of an emergency rather than experiment. Such a case was Leonid Rogozov who was obliged to remove his own appendix in 1961 while stranded in Antarctica in winter. However, the first surgeon to carry out this self-operation, Evan O'Neill Kane in 1921, did so with an element of experiment. Although Kane's operation was necessary, it was not necessary to do it himself, so that in itself was experimental. More than that, Kane wished to experience the operation under local anaesthetic before trying the procedure on his patients. Kane advocated a reduction in the use of general anaesthetic by surgeons. In 2023, Michael Raduga, a Russian lucid dreaming researcher, performed self-neurosurgery that included trepanation, electrode implantation, and electrical stimulation of the motor cortex.

==== Sensory deprivation ====
John C. Lilly developed the first sensory deprivation tanks and self-experimented them with the intention to study the origin of consciousness and its relation to the brain by creating an environment which isolates an individual from external stimulation.

==== Temperature and pressure ====
Joseph Barcroft, in 1920, spent six days in a sealed glass chamber to investigate respiration at altitude. The partial pressure of oxygen was initially 163 mmHg falling to 84 mmHg (equivalent to an altitude of 18,000 ft) as the experiment progressed. Barcroft was attempting to disprove a theory of John Scott Haldane that the lungs actively secrete oxygen into the blood (rather than just through the process of passive diffusion) under conditions of low oxygen partial pressure. Barcroft suffered from severe hypoxia. At the end of experiment, part of Barcroft's left radial artery was removed for investigation.

In 1931, Barcroft subjected himself to freezing temperatures while naked. Towards the end of the experiment he showed signs of the final stages of hypothermia. He was thought to be close to death and had to be rescued by colleagues.

==== Neural implant ====
Kevin Warwick had an array of 100 electrodes fired into the median nerve fibres of his left arm. With this in place, over a 3-month period, he conducted a number of experiments linking his nervous system with the internet.

==== Neural adaption to immobilization ====
Nico Dosenbach wore a pink cast over his (unbroken) right arm for two weeks in order to examine how brain circuits controlling movement are impacted by immobilizing illnesses or injuries. He did a 30-minute resting state fMRI study daily and identified an undiscovered pattern of pulses of rs-fMRI signal in motor regions controlling the disused anatomy. In a second experiment, he took psilocybin while in an fMRI scanner in a study he led as principal investigator.

== See also ==
- Human enhancement
- N of 1 trial
- Personal science
- Quantified self
