= Senn =

Senn is a term for the chief herdsman tending an Alp. As a surname:

- Alfred E. Senn (1932–2016), professor emeritus of history at the University of Wisconsin–Madison
- Bill Senn (1905–1973), professional American football running back in the National Football League
- Chris Senn (skateboarder) (born 1972), professional skateboarder, known for his aggressive and spontaneous style
- Daniel Senn (born 1983), Swiss footballer
- Deborah Senn, Washington politician
- Frank Senn (born 1943), American Lutheran pastor and liturgiologist
- Franz Senn (1831–1884), pastor, whose concern for the poverty of his parishioners lead him to encourage tourism into the Stubai
- Gustav Senn (1875–1945), Swiss botanist
- Hans Senn (1918–2007), general officer of the Swiss Army
- Jean Antoine Petit-Senn (1792–1870), poet of French-Swiss origin
- Johann Senn (1795–1857), political lyric poet of the Vormärz
- John J. Senn, American politician
- John Senn (Ontario politician)
- Jordan Senn (born 1984), American football linebacker
- Mark Senn (1878–1951), Conservative and Progressive Conservative party member of the Canadian House of Commons
- Mirjam Hauser-Senn (born 1980), Swiss cyclist
- Nicholas Senn (1844–1908), surgeon, instructor, and founder of the Association of Military Surgeons of the United States
- Nikolaus Senn (1926–2014), former co-director of Schweizerische Bankgesellschaft
- Reinhold Senn (1936–2023), Austrian luger who competed during the 1960s
- Ricardo Senn (1931–2012), retired track and road bicycle racer from Argentina
- Thomas J. Senn, American naval officer and 1891 graduate of the United States Naval Academy
- Valentin Senn (born 2000), Austrian-American football player

== See also ==
- Franz Senn Hut, alpine hut in the Stubai Alps owned by the Austrian Alpine Club
- Senn High School, located on the North Side of Chicago in the Edgewater community
- Senn retractor, double ended retractors used in surgical procedures
