= Anne Parrish (philanthropist) =

American philanthropist (1760–1800)

- Born: October 17, 1760; Philadelphia, Pennsylvania, British America
- Died: December 26, 1800 (aged 40); Philadelphia, Pennsylvania, U.S.
- Occupation: Philanthropist

Anne Parrish (1760–1800) was an American Quaker philanthropist. Following the 1793 yellow fever epidemic in Philadelphia, she devoted herself to philanthropy and co-founded a women's relief society for the poor. The Female Society for the Relief of the Distressed, founded in 1795, was one of the first charitable women's organizations in the United States. Parrish also establish a free school for girls in her home in 1796. The school expanded over the years, later becoming the Aimwell School which lasted until 1923.

== Early life ==
Anne Parrish was born in Philadelphia, Pennsylvania, on October 17, 1760. Her family was prominent in the Philadelphia Quaker community. Her mother, Sarah Mitchell, would later attend meetings of her organization, and her father Isaac Parrish was a hatmaker. Parrish's brother Joseph (1779–1840) went on to become a physician.

== Yellow fever and philanthropy ==
Parrish was 33 years old during the 1793 Philadelphia yellow fever epidemic, which claimed the lives of 5,000 Philadelphians (then one-tenth of the population). Her parents were among those who fell ill during the epidemic and she made a vow to devote her life to philanthropy should they recover. While two of her younger brothers did not survive, her parents did.

Parrish started providing assistance to Philadelphians who had been impacted by the epidemic. On November 9, 1795, Parrish met with 23 other young Quaker women in a private home and formed the Female Society for the Relief of the Distressed. (Note: The organization was later renamed the Female Society for the Relief and Employment of the Poor in 1811.) They kept records of their proceedings and in their first meeting it was recorded:

"A number of young Women having been induced to believe from the Observations they have made, that they could afford some assistance to their suffering fellow Creatures, particularly Widows and Orphans; by entering into a Subscription for their relief, visiting them in their solatary [sic] Dwellings without distinction of Nation or Colour, sympathizing in their afflictions and as far as their Ability extends alleviating them."

The Female Society provided aid to the families of those who had succumbed to yellow fever, initially distributing clothing, food and fuel around Philadelphia. They went on to establish the House of Industry to provide employment for impoverished women, spinning wool and flax. The organization was among the first charities in the United States for women and was a departure from the traditional charitable endeavors of Quaker women, being directed towards the general population rather than just the Quaker community. A letter to the Society from the physician John Marsillac was indicative of the general sentiment towards the organization and was preserved in the organization's minutes. In it, he lauded their "zeal" but questioned whether they shouldn't limit their benevolence to just widows and orphans. The House of Industry established a daycare for working mothers in 1799.

Parrish opened a free day school for indigent white girls in her father's house in 1796. In 1798, many of the same women who had founded the Society for the Relief and Employment of the Poor, formalized the school as the Aimwell School Association. By its third year, the school had around 50 students and several teachers. Domestic skill training in sewing accompanied coursework. In 1797, the school was moved to Corporation School House.

Addressing the uneasiness expressed by older members of her community towards her endeavors, Parrish wrote in a letter, "could I walk on in the beaten path without daring to think for myself, but relying entirely upon the judgment of those advanced in life... I might perhaps find an easier way... The time will come when I will be better understood." She went on to say that:

"None seem to understand my language. Some I meet with seem to be as insensible to my meaning as though I spoke in a foreign tongue. Even some I dearly love, cannot altogether unite with me. I believe they are afraid I shall be singular, and... led astray. I know some of them are religiously inclined, and would rejoice to see me so too, but my ideas of religion differ a little from theirs."

Her friend Catharine W. Morris, was responsible for an account of Parrish, writing in part:

"She was exemplary in fulfilling the Commands of her Saviour, in visiting the Sick; feeding the Hungry, and clothing the Naked— and many were the Hours she passed in seeking out the Habitation of the disconsolate Widow, and wiping the artless Tear of sorrow from the Eye of the innocent Orphan."

Parrish died in Philadelphia on December 26, 1800. The Aimwell School continued operating until 1923.
