= George E. Stubbins House =

Historic house in Iowa, United States

- U.S. National Register of Historic Places
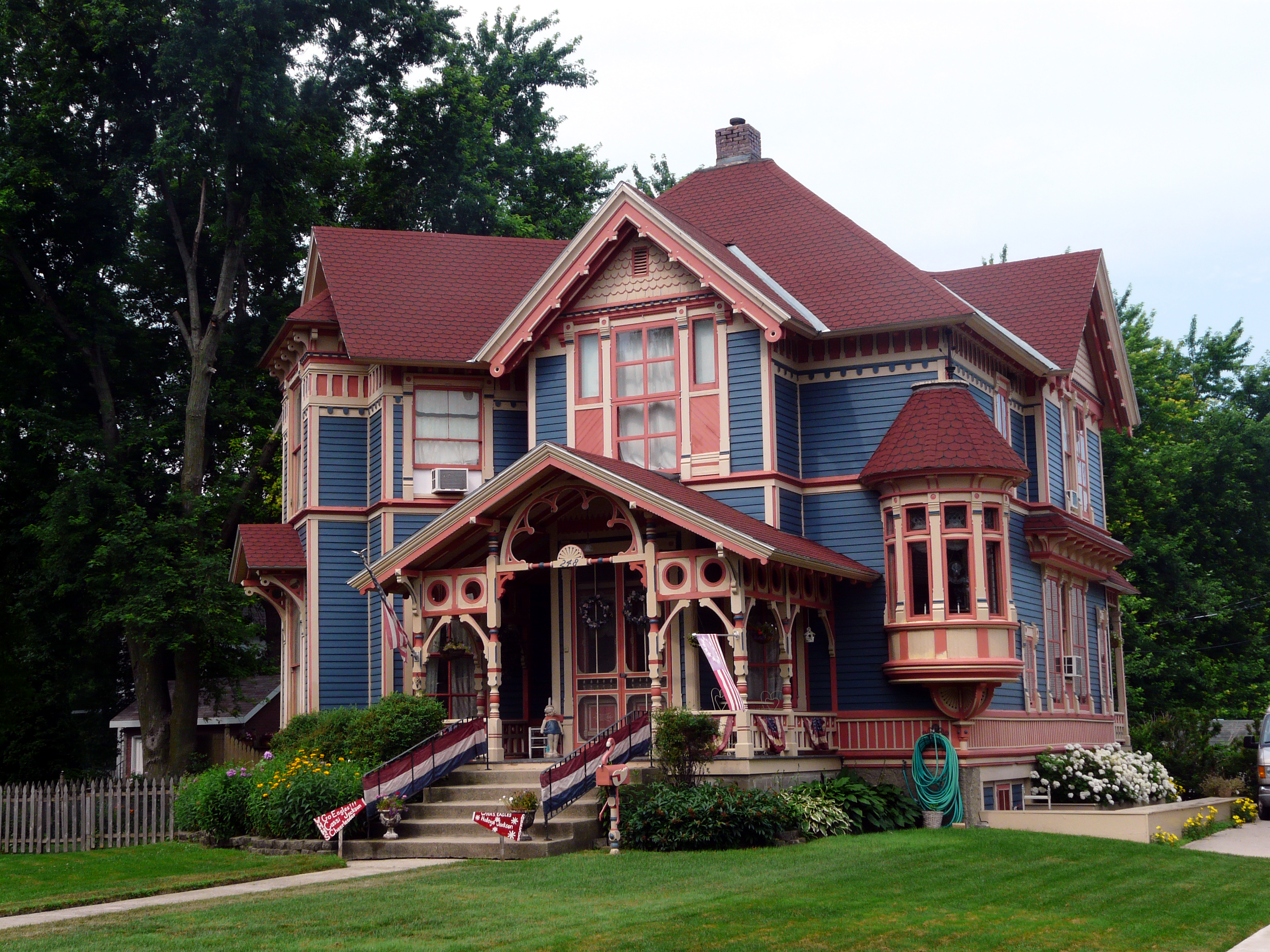

- Location within Iowa Location within the United States
- Location: 248 1st Ave., SW. Britt, Iowa
- Coordinates: 43°05′40″N 93°48′12″W
- Area: less than one acre
- Built: 1886
- Architectural style: Queen Anne; Stick-Eastlake
- NRHP reference No.: 99000453
- Added to NRHP: April 15, 1999

The George E. Stubbins House, also known as the Reibsamen-Weiland House, is a historic residence located in Britt, Iowa, United States. George E. Stubbins was a local merchant who built the first brick commercial block in town, and served as Britt's first mayor. The house was purchased by Mary Reibsamen in 1922, and it has remained in that family at least into the late 1990s. The house is considered one of the finest Eastlake houses in Iowa. Its Gothic Revival influences, which include the corner oriel window, the gabled and bracketed roof over the first-story bay, and the vergeboards, are combined with its cross-gable hip roof from the Queen Anne style to fully express the Stick style. It was listed on the National Register of Historic Places in 1999.
