= Sixth Army Corps (Spanish–American War) =

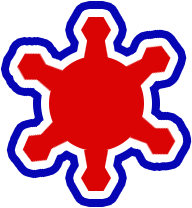
- Active: (never organized)
- Country: United States of America
- Branch: Army of the United States
- Type: Corps
- Role: Infantry
- Engagements: Spanish–American War

Insignia
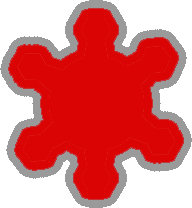
- Sixth Corps 1st Division

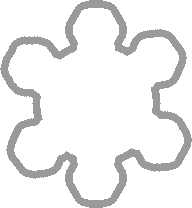
- Sixth Corps 2nd Division

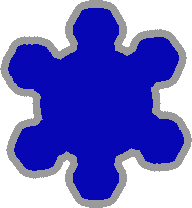
- Sixth Corps 3rd Division

The Sixth Army Corps was a unit of the United States Army authorized during the Spanish–American War, but which was never organized. After the declaration of war, General Order 36 of May 7, 1898 approved the organization of eight "army corps," each of which was to consist of three or more divisions of three brigades each.

General Order 46 of May 16, 1898 assigned commanding officers and training camps to the new corps. Major General James H. Wilson was designated commander, with the corps to assemble at Camp Thomas, Georgia. For reasons that cannot be immediately determined—but which may have stemmed from the near-collapse of organization at Camp Thomas, which was also the mustering point for the First and Third corps—the Sixth Corps was never organized and Wilson was transferred to command of the First Division in the First Army Corps.
