= Nicholas Senn =

Dr. Nicholas Senn M. D.
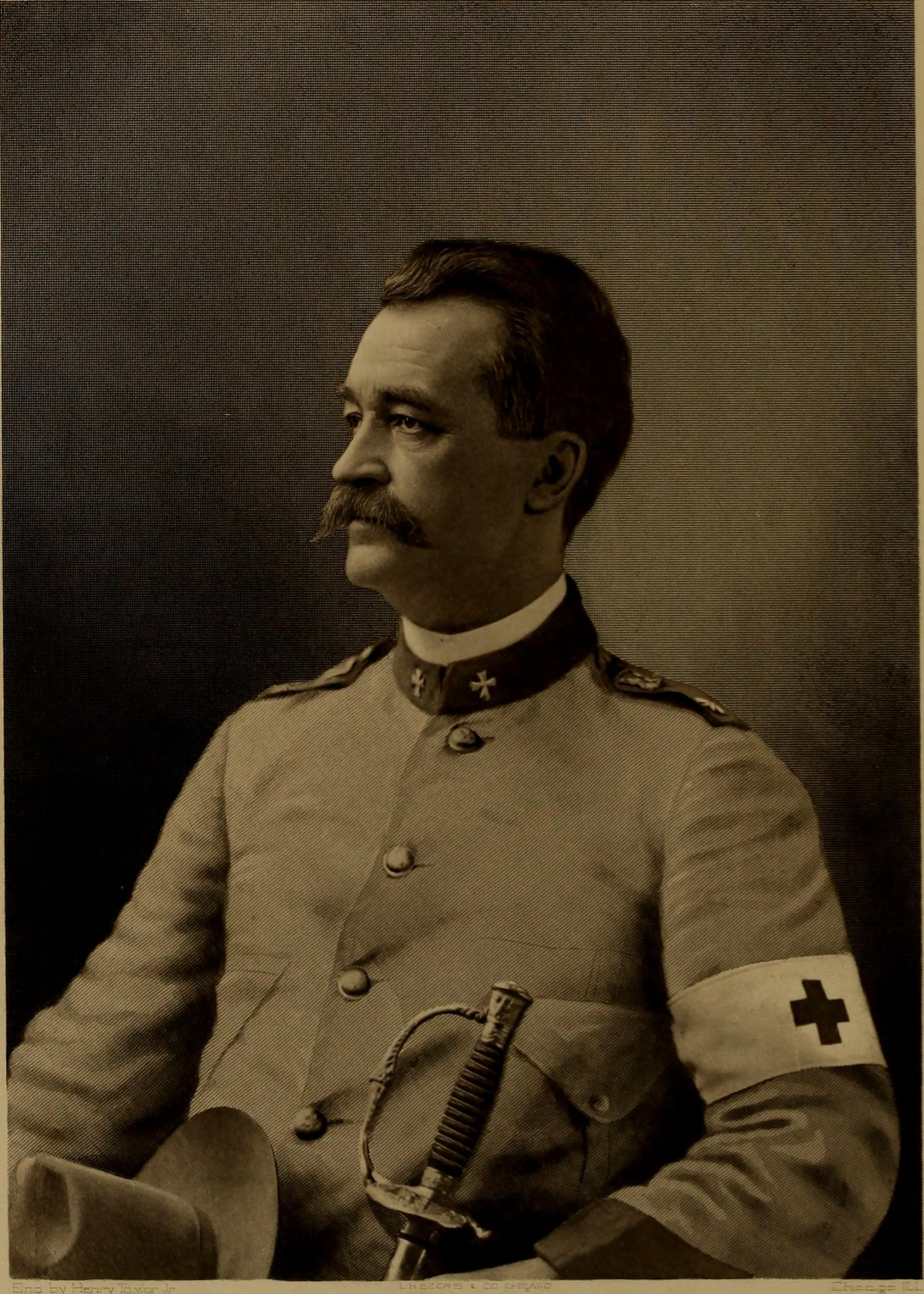
- Nicholas Senn in 1904
- Born: October 31, 1844; Buchs, Switzerland
- Died: January 2, 1908 (aged 63); Chicago, Illinois
- Occupation: Surgeon
- Spouse: Aurelia Millhouser
- Children: Emanuel John Senn; William Nicholas Senn
- Parent(s): Johannes and Magdalena Senn

Nicholas Senn (October 31, 1844 – January 2, 1908) was a Swiss-born American surgeon, instructor, and founder of the Association of Military Surgeons of the United States. He served as the president of the American Medical Association in 1897–98 and as chief surgeon of the Sixth Army Corps in 1898, seeing service in Cuba during the Spanish–American War. He was involved in experimental research, particularly of acute pancreatitis, plastic surgery, head and neck oncology, the intestinal tract, and the treatment of leukaemia with x-rays.

== Early life and education ==
Senn was born in Buchs, canton of St. Gallen, Switzerland and emigrated to the United States with his family in 1852 when he was eight years old, settling in Ashford, Wisconsin. He graduated from the Chicago Medical College in 1868.

== Career ==
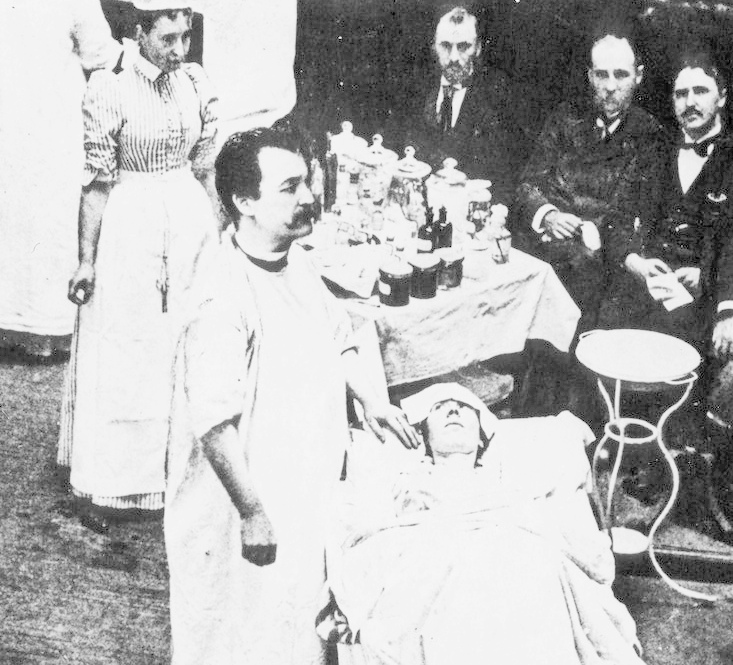
Senn conducts a surgical clinic for medical students, 1895

Senn spent the first few years after graduating as practitioner and resident physician at the Cook County Hospital in Chicago, later becoming attending physician in a Milwaukee hospital.

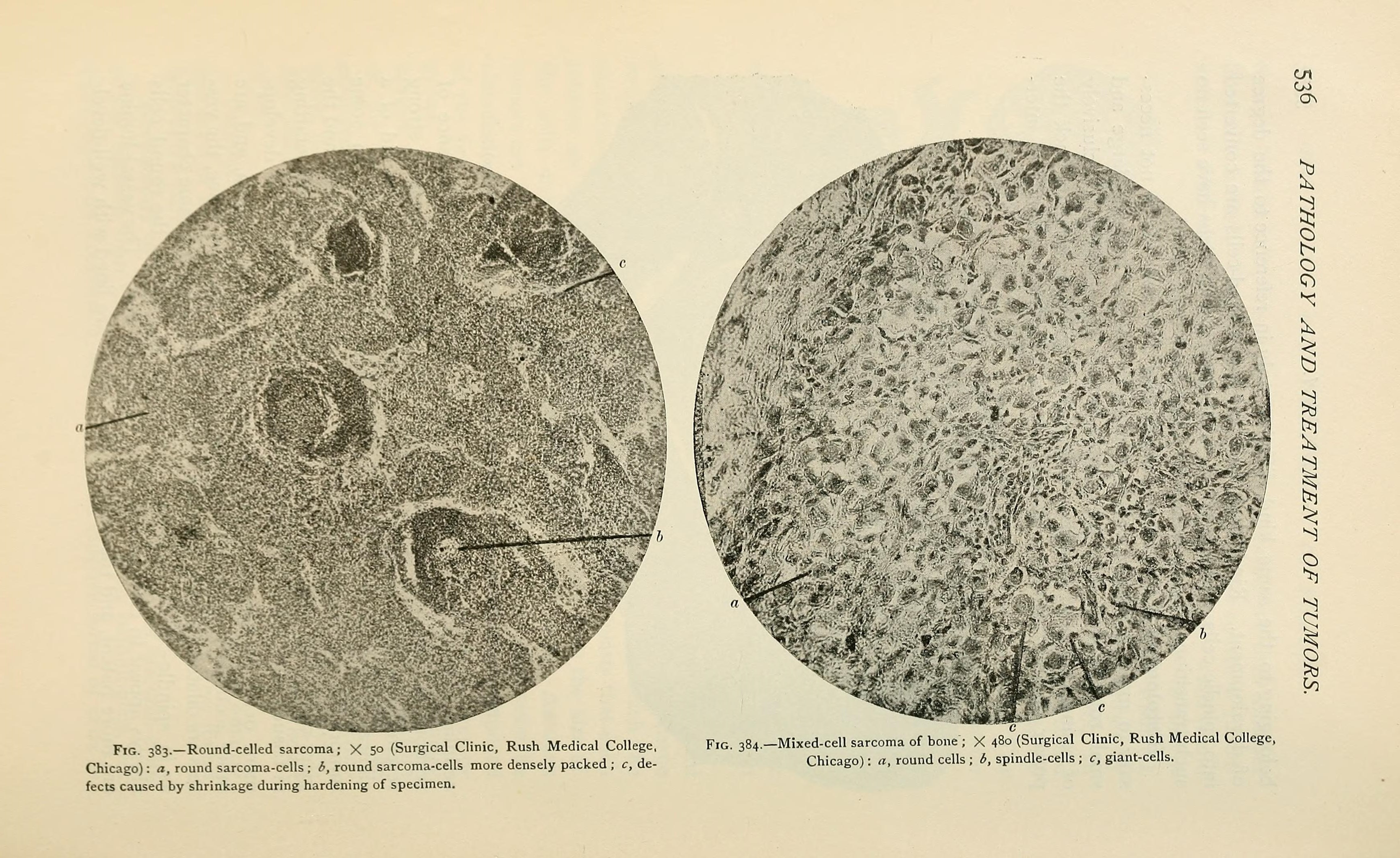
Diagram of cancerous tumors authored by Senn

In 1877, he left for the Ludwig-Maximilians-Universität München for postgraduate study, graduating in 1878 with a second M.D.

In 1878, he joined the faculty of Rush Medical College in Chicago as Professor of Surgery.

In 1884, he was appointed as Professor of Surgery at the College of Physicians and Surgeons of Chicago.

Around 1886, Senn successfully tested the diagnosis of gastrointestinal perforation by inflation with hydrogen gas. Senn used a rubber balloon connected to a rubber tube inserted in his anus to pump 6 liters of hydrogen gas into his intestinal tract. An assistant sealed the tube by squeezing the anus against it. The hydrogen was inserted by squeezing the balloon while monitoring the pressure on a manometer. Senn had previously carried out this experiment on dogs to the point of rupturing the intestine.

Between 1887 and 1888, he served as a vice president of the American Surgical Association.

In 1890, he became professor of practical and clinical surgery and surgical pathology at Rush Medical College, progressing to head of the department of surgery in 1891.

In 1890, 1897, 1903 and 1906, he was a delegate to the International Medical Congress at Berlin, Moscow, Madrid and Lisbon.

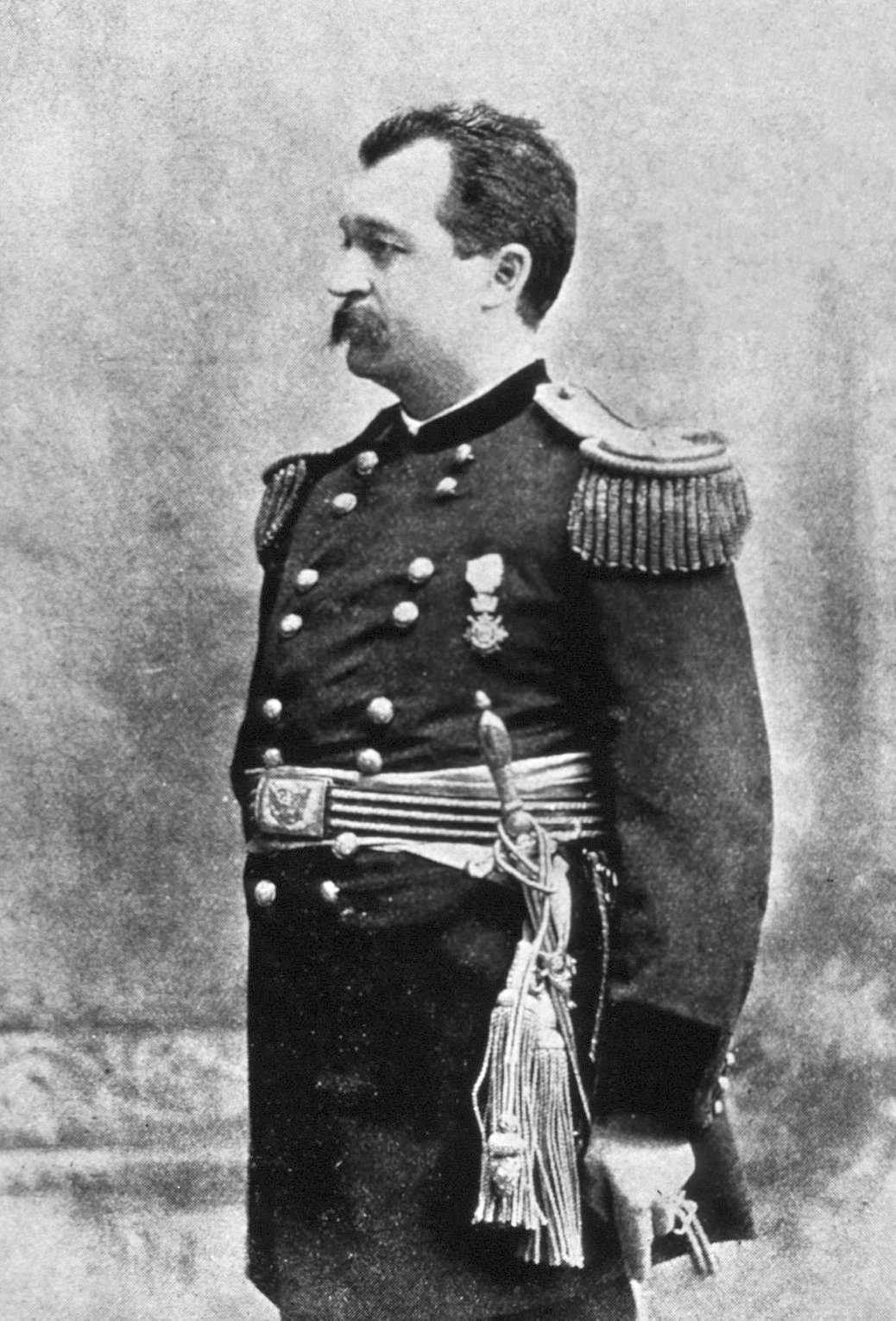
Nicholas Senn in military uniform

In 1891, he founded the Association of Military Surgeons of the United States and served as its president for the first two years.

Between 1892 and 1893, he served as president of the American Surgical Association

After 1893, he was attending surgeon at the Presbyterian Hospital and surgeon-in-chief of Saint Joseph's Hospital, as well as a professor of surgery at the Chicago Polyclinic and a lecturer on military surgery at the University of Chicago.

In 1897, he was awarded a Ph.D. by the University of Wisconsin. He also served as the president of the American Medical Association in 1897–98.

In 1898, following the outbreak of the Spanish–American War, he was appointed as chief surgeon of the United States Sixth Army Corps with the rank of lieutenant-colonel and chief of staff, and was involved in the Siege of Santiago.

Sometime during his career, he was also Surgeon General of the National Guard of Illinois and Wisconsin, and founded the Association of Military Surgeons of the State of Illinois, which he presided over until his death.

== Legacy ==
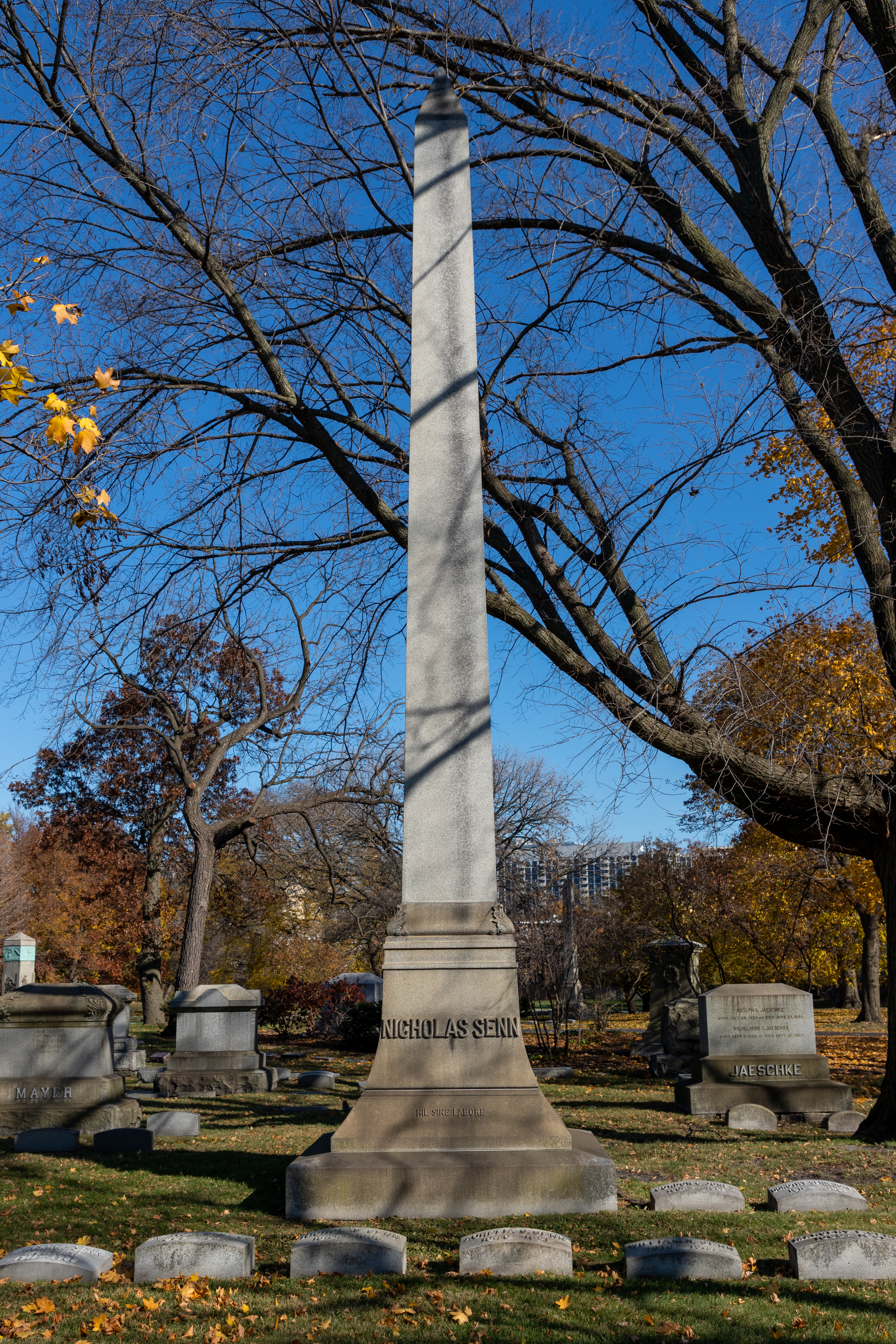
Senn's grave at Graceland Cemetery

Senn published 25 books as well as numerous papers and essays during his career, including the 1886 paper Surgery of the pancreas as based upon experiments and clinical research, and the books Four Months Among the Surgeons of Europe and the Nurse's Guide for the Operating Room.

Throughout his career, Senn amassed a collection of 10,000 volumes and 14,000 pamphlets and articles dating from the 1500s onwards on medicine and surgery, which has been stored in the John Crerar Library. He also purchased the 7,000 volume collection of old and rare medical books left by a prominent doctor in Germany and donated the materials to the Newberry Library.

Senn is the namesake for Senn High School in Chicago, which was named for him on March 20, 1909 following his death. Senn is also known for saying "The fate of the wounded rests with the one who applies the first dressing" in 1897.

Senn also authored a book, Around the World via India - a medical tour, published by American Medical Association Press, Chicago, in 1905.

== See also ==
- Self-experimentation in medicine#Hydrogen
