= Stubbins Ffirth =

American physician (1782–1820)

- Born: February 2, 1782; Salem County, New Jersey, U.S.
- Died: July 4, 1820 (aged 38); South Carolina, U.S.
- Occupation: Doctor

A Treatise on Malignant Fever; with an Attempt to Prove its Non-contagious Nature.

Stubbins Ffirth (1782 – 1820) was an American trainee medical doctor notable for his unusual investigations into the cause of yellow fever. He theorized that the disease was not contagious, believing that the drop in cases during winter showed that it was more likely a result of the heat and stresses of the summer months. While correct in noting that yellow fever was significantly more prevalent in summer, Ffirth's explanation proved to be incorrect. It was a full six decades after his death that a breakthrough would be made, with Cuban scientist Carlos Finlay discovering the link to mosquitoes carrying the disease.

== Works ==
The 1793 yellow fever epidemic, the largest outbreak of the disease in American history, killed as many as 5,000 people in Philadelphia, Pennsylvania – roughly 10% of the population. Ffirth joined the University of Pennsylvania in 1801 to study medicine, and in his third year he began researching the disease that had so significantly impacted the area. At the time, the causes of yellow fever were unknown, and Ffirth set out to prove that it was not contagious. He was so sure of his theory that he began to perform experiments on himself.

Ffirth chose to bring himself into direct contact with bodily fluids from people that had become infected with yellow fever. He started by making incisions on his arms and smearing infected vomit into the cuts; he then proceeded to pour it onto his eyeballs. He continued in his attempts to infect himself by frying the vomit and inhaling the fumes, and finally, when he did not become ill, he resorted to drinking the vomit undiluted. Endeavoring to prove that other bodily fluids yielded the same results, Ffirth progressed on from vomit, also smearing his body with blood, saliva, and urine. He still failed to contract the disease and saw this as proof of his hypothesis that yellow fever was non-contagious. However, it later emerged that the samples used by Ffirth for his experiments had come from late-stage patients who were no longer contaminated with the virus.

Ffirth published his findings in his 1804 thesis, A Treatise on Malignant Fever; with an Attempt to Prove its Non-contagious Nature.

== Birth and death ==
Records of his grave marker note his date of birth as February 2, 1782 in Salem County, New Jersey which at the time was an English Colony. Ffirth's death occurred on July 4, 1820 in Ffirthville, St. Paul's Parish, South Carolina, US, at the age of 39.
