= Notifiable diseases in the United Kingdom =

Diseases which must be reported to British authorities

A notifiable disease is one which the law requires to be reported to government authorities.

In England and Wales, notification of infectious diseases is a statutory duty for registered medical practitioners and laboratories, under the Public Health (Control of Disease) Act 1984 and (in England) the Health Protection (Notification) Regulations 2010. Similar provision, albeit with a different list of diseases, is made for Wales in the Health Protection (Notification) (Wales) Regulations 2010. Medical practitioners are required to notify their local authority of diseases on the list in writing within three days, or if the situation is urgent, by telephone within 24 hours. For Scotland, similar provision is made by the Public Health etc. (Scotland) Act 2008.

== List of notifiable diseases ==
The diseases notifiable in England to local authorities under the Health Protection (Notification) Regulations 2010 are:

- Acute encephalitis
- Acute infectious hepatitis
- Acute poliomyelitis
- Anthrax
- Botulism
- Brucellosis
- Cholera
- COVID-19
- Diphtheria
- Enteric fever
- Food poisoning
- Hemolytic uremic syndrome
- Infectious bloody diarrhoea
- Invasive group A streptococcal disease
- Legionnaires' disease
- Leprosy
- Malaria
- Measles
- Meningococcal sepsis
- Mpox
- Mumps
- Plague
- Rabies
- Rubella
- Severe Acute Respiratory Syndrome (SARS)
- Scarlet fever
- Smallpox
- Tetanus
- Tuberculosis
- Typhus
- Viral haemorrhagic fever (VHF)
- Whooping cough
- Yellow fever

== List of notifiable organisms ==
The causative organisms which the laboratories shall notify to the proper authority under the Health Protection (Notification) Regulations 2010 are:

- Bacillus anthracis
- Bacillus cereus (only if associated with food poisoning)
- Bordetella pertussis
- Borrelia spp
- Brucella spp
- Burkholderia mallei
- Burkholderia pseudomallei
- Campylobacter spp
- Chikungunya virus
- Chlamydophila psittaci
- Clostridium botulinum
- Clostridium perfringens (only if associated with food poisoning)
- Clostridium tetani
- Corynebacterium diphtheriae
- Corynebacterium ulcerans
- Coxiella burnetii
- Crimean-Congo haemorrhagic fever virus
- Cryptosporidium spp
- Dengue virus
- Ebola virus
- Entamoeba histolytica
- Francisella tularensis
- Giardia lamblia
- Guanarito virus
- Haemophilus influenzae (invasive)
- Hanta virus
- Hepatitis A, B, C, delta, and E viruses
- Influenza virus
- Junin virus
- Kyasanur Forest disease virus
- Lassa virus
- Legionella spp
- Leptospira interrogans
- Listeria monocytogenes
- Machupo virus
- Marburg virus
- Measles virus
- Mumps virus
- Mycobacterium tuberculosis complex
- Neisseria meningitidis
- Omsk haemorrhagic fever virus
- Plasmodium falciparum, vivax, ovale, malariae, knowlesi
- Polio virus (wild or vaccine types)
- Rabies virus (classical rabies and rabies-related lyssaviruses)
- Rickettsia spp
- Rift Valley fever virus
- Rubella virus
- Sabia virus
- Salmonella spp
- SARS coronavirus
- Shigella spp
- Streptococcus pneumoniae (invasive)
- Streptococcus pyogenes (invasive)
- Varicella zoster virus
- Variola virus
- Verocytotoxigenic Escherichia coli (including E. coli O157)
- Vibrio cholerae
- West Nile virus
- Yellow fever virus
- Yersinia pestis

== See also ==
- UK statutory notification system
