= Lujo virus =

Virus classification
- (unranked): Virus
- Realm: Riboviria
- Kingdom: Orthornavirae
- Phylum: Negarnaviricota
- Class: Bunyaviricetes
- Order: Hareavirales
- Family: Arenaviridae
- Genus: Mammarenavirus
- Species: Mammarenavirus lujoense

Synonyms
- Lujo mammarenavirus; LuJo virus; Lusaka/Johannesburg virus

Species of virus

Lujo virus (Mammarenavirus lujoense) is a bisegmented RNA virus—a member of the family Arenaviridae—and a known cause of viral hemorrhagic fever (VHF) in humans. Its name was suggested by the Special Pathogens Unit of the National Institute for Communicable Diseases of the National Health Laboratory Service (NICD-NHLS) by using the first two letters of the names of the cities involved in the 2008 outbreak of the disease, Lusaka (Zambia) and Johannesburg (Republic of South Africa). It is the second pathogenic Arenavirus to be described from the African continent—the first being Lassa virus—and since 2012 has been classed as a "Select Agent" under U.S. law.

== History ==
Only five cases of this virus have ever been reported; all five were identified in September and October 2008, and four were fatal. Those infections that proved fatal caused death within 10–13 days of showing symptoms. All four patients in whom infection proved fatal first showed signs of improvement and then went into respiratory distress, displayed neurological problems, and had circulatory issues that resulted in collapse. The discovery of this novel virus was described following a highly fatal nosocomial (hospital) outbreak of VHF in Johannesburg. The identification of this virus was the first new arenavirus discovered in over 40 years.

The first case was a female travel agent who lived on the outskirts of Lusaka. She developed a fever, which progressed over time. She was evacuated to Johannesburg for medical treatment. Almost two weeks later, the paramedic who nursed the patient on the flight to South Africa also fell ill and was brought to Johannesburg for medical treatment. At this time, the connection between these two patients was recognized by the attending physician in the Johannesburg hospital. Together with the NICD-NHLS the clinical syndrome of VHF was recognized and specimens from the second patient were submitted for laboratory confirmation. In addition, a cleaner and a nurse that had contact with the first patient also fell ill. A second nurse was infected through contact with the paramedic. The outbreak had a high case fatality rate with 4 of 5 identified cases resulting in death.

The Special Pathogens Unit of the NICD-NHLS, together with colleagues from the Special Pathogens Unit of the U.S. Centers for Disease Control and Prevention (CDC), identified the etiological agent of the outbreak as an Old World arenavirus using molecular and serological tests. Sequencing and phylogenetic investigation of partial genome sequencing indicated that this virus was not Lassavirus and likely a previously unreported arenavirus. This was corroborated by full genome sequencing that was conducted by the NICD-NHLS, CDC and collaborators from Columbia University in New York.

== Transmission ==
Viruses from the Arenaviridae family, to which the Lujo virus belongs, almost always have a rodent reservoir, with one virus in the family having a bat reservoir. Contact with an infected rodent host, its urine or fecal matter, inhalation of dust with virus particles, or eating food containing remnants of the virus can result in human infection. Transmission can also occur via human-to-human contact, as evidenced by the 5 cases from 2008, but it is still not completely clear how the first case was contracted. Both bats and rodents should be considered possible contact points, just to be safe. Though it is not known for sure, it is speculated that the human-to-human transmission occurs from contact with bodily fluids. The incubation period is expected to be 7–13 days.

== Signs and symptoms ==
VHF symptoms appear similar to other viruses of the same family, such as Lassa fever. The known symptoms include swelling in the neck and face, sore throat, diarrhea, and a rash resembling measles on the face and body. Blood tests of those infected revealed elevated liver values, white blood cell counts that were first low and then elevated over time, and low platelet counts.

== Treatment ==
In-depth research into the Lujo virus and its treatment has been challenging due to the lack of economic and cultural stability of the regions where the only known cases have occurred. Under treatment with oral ribavirin, patient 5 continued to deteriorate. However, the treatment shifted to i.v on day 8, and it seemed to have cured the only surviving patient with Lujo Virus infection. Since the five affected people in 2008 have been the only cases identified, there has not been much opportunity for further research.

== Phylogenetics ==
Sequencing of the viral genome has shown that this virus belongs to the Old World arenavirus group. Comparisons with other viral genome sequences showed that this virus is equidistant from other Old World and New World arenaviruses. It is distantly similar to the other pathogenic African arenavirus, Lassa fever virus.

== Clinical ==
This virus has been associated with an outbreak of five cases of VHF in September and October 2008. In four cases (80% of total known infections), the infection was fatal. The fifth case was treated with ribavirin early after onset of clinical disease (was detected through active contact tracing), an antiviral drug which is effective in treating Lassa fever, and survived; however, complete ribavirin's effectiveness against Lujo virus remains unknown but may be useful as adjunctive therapy.
