= VHF (disambiguation) =

VHF may refer to:

- Very high frequency radio
- Viral haemorrhagic fever
- VHF Records
- Venezuelan hemorrhagic fever
