= Morogoro virus =

Virus classification
- (unranked): Virus
- Realm: Riboviria
- Kingdom: Orthornavirae
- Phylum: Negarnaviricota
- Class: Bunyaviricetes
- Order: Hareavirales
- Family: Arenaviridae
- Genus: Mammarenavirus
- Virus: Morogoro virus

East African arenavirus infecting the multimammate mouse

Morogoro virus is an East African arenavirus infecting the multimammate mouse (Mastomys natalensis). The virus is genetically closely related to Lassa virus, known to cause Lassa fever in humans. Morogoro virus, however, does not seem to infect humans. Transmission of Morogoro virus between mice is assumed to occur via direct and indirect contact. Infected animals pass a latent period of 7 days and subsequently shed the virus for about 30 days, after which they recover and develop lifelong antibodies. Transmission may also be possible from infected mothers to offspring and through sexual contact, as this has been suggested for other arenaviruses.
