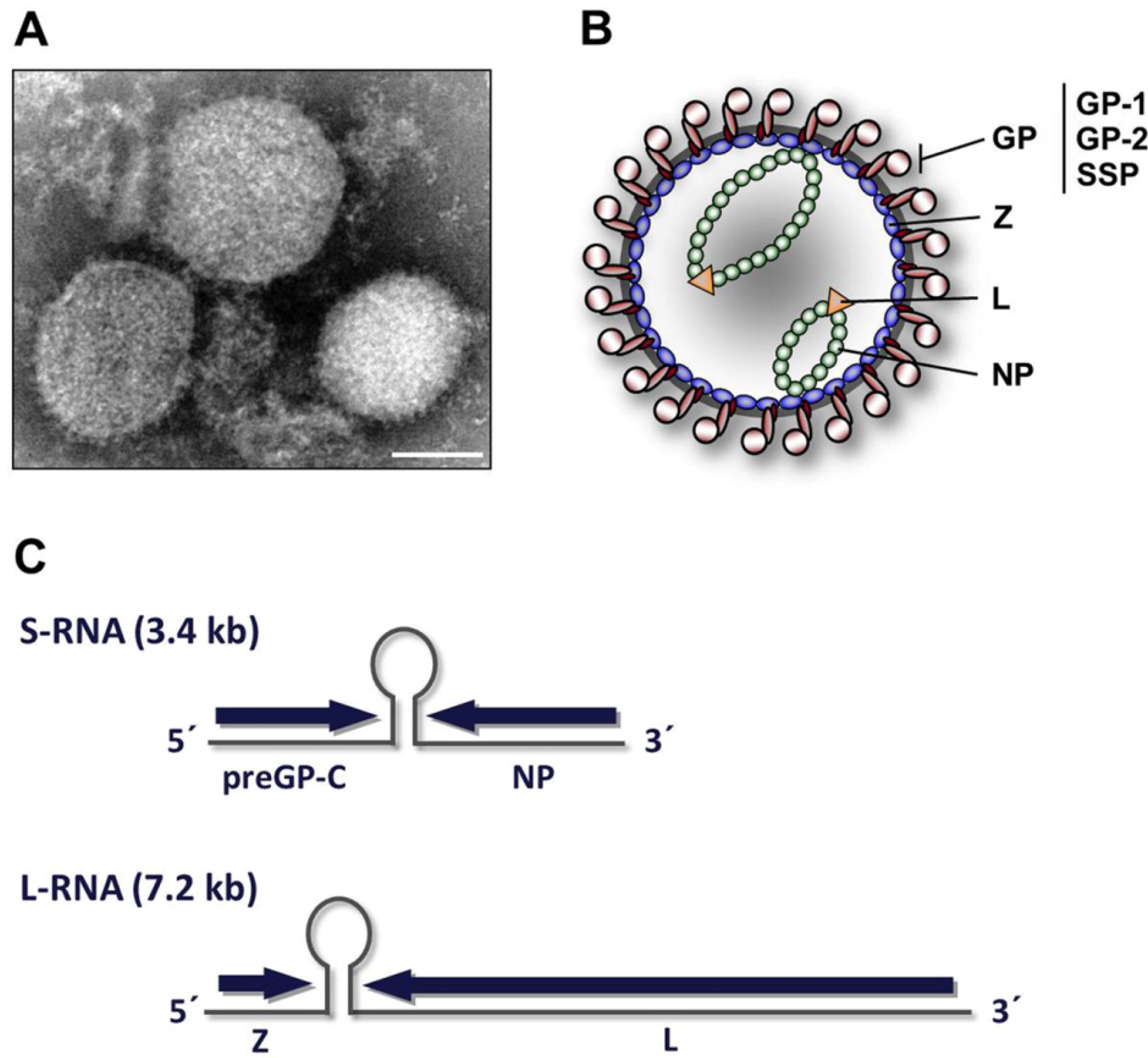
- (A) Electron micrograph of Lassa virus, bar = 100nm (B) diagram and (C) genome of arenavirus

Virus classification
- (unranked): Virus
- Realm: Riboviria
- Kingdom: Orthornavirae
- Phylum: Negarnaviricota
- Class: Bunyaviricetes
- Order: Hareavirales
- Family: Arenaviridae

Genera
- Antennavirus; Hartmanivirus; Innmovirus; Mammarenavirus; Reptarenavirus

= Arenavirus =

Arenaviridae

Family of RNA viruses

An arenavirus is a bi- or trisegmented ambisense RNA virus that is a member of the family Arenaviridae. These viruses infect rodents and occasionally humans. A class of novel, highly divergent arenaviruses, properly known as reptarenaviruses, have also been discovered which infect snakes to produce inclusion body disease, mostly in boa constrictors. At least eight arenaviruses are known to cause human disease. The diseases derived from arenaviruses range in severity. Aseptic meningitis, a severe human disease that causes inflammation covering the brain and spinal cord, can arise from the lymphocytic choriomeningitis virus. Hemorrhagic fever syndromes, including Lassa fever, are derived from infections such as Guanarito virus, Junin virus, Lassa virus, Lujo virus, Machupo virus, Sabia virus, or Whitewater Arroyo virus. Because of the epidemiological association with rodents, some arenaviruses and bunyaviruses are designated as roboviruses.

== Structure ==
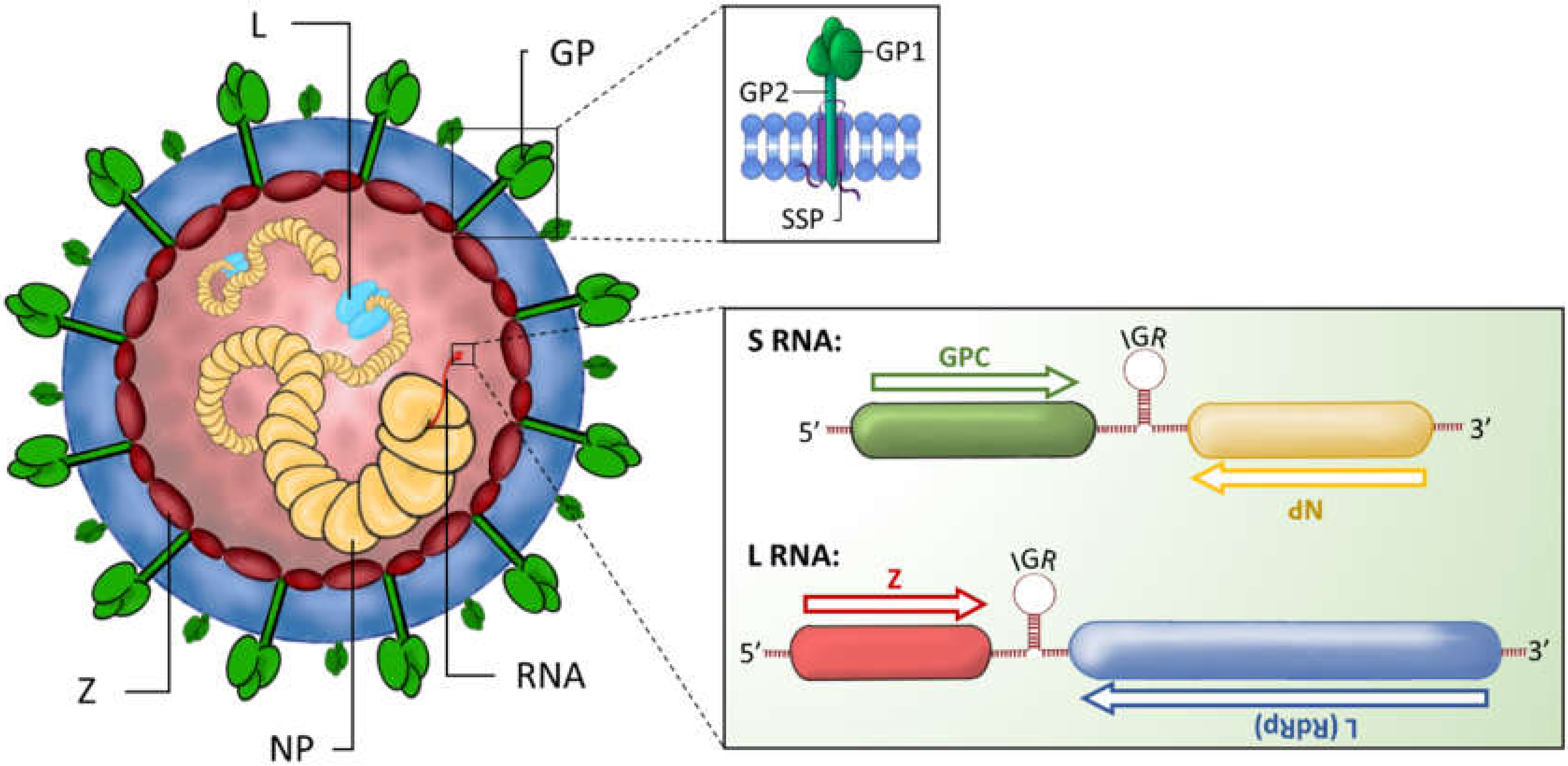
Mammarenavirus structure and genome composition.

Viewed in cross-section, arenaviruses contain grainy particles that are ribosomes acquired from their host cells. It is from this characteristic that they acquired the name arena, from the Latin root meaning sand. The ribosomal structures are not believed to be essential for virus replication. Virus particles, or virions, are pleomorphic (variable in shape) but are often spherical, with a diameter of 60–300 nm, and are covered with surface glycoprotein spikes.

The virus contains a beaded nucleocapsid with two single-stranded RNA segments. The nucleocapsid consists of a core of nucleic acid enclosed in a protein coat. Although they are categorized as negative-sense viruses, arenaviruses are ambisense. While sections of their genome encode genes in the negative sense (reverse polarity), other sections encode genes in the opposite (forward/positive sense) direction. This complex gene expression structure is theorized to be a primitive regulatory system, allowing the virus to control what proteins are synthesized at what point in the life cycle. The life cycle of the arenavirus is restricted to the cell cytoplasm.

== Genome ==
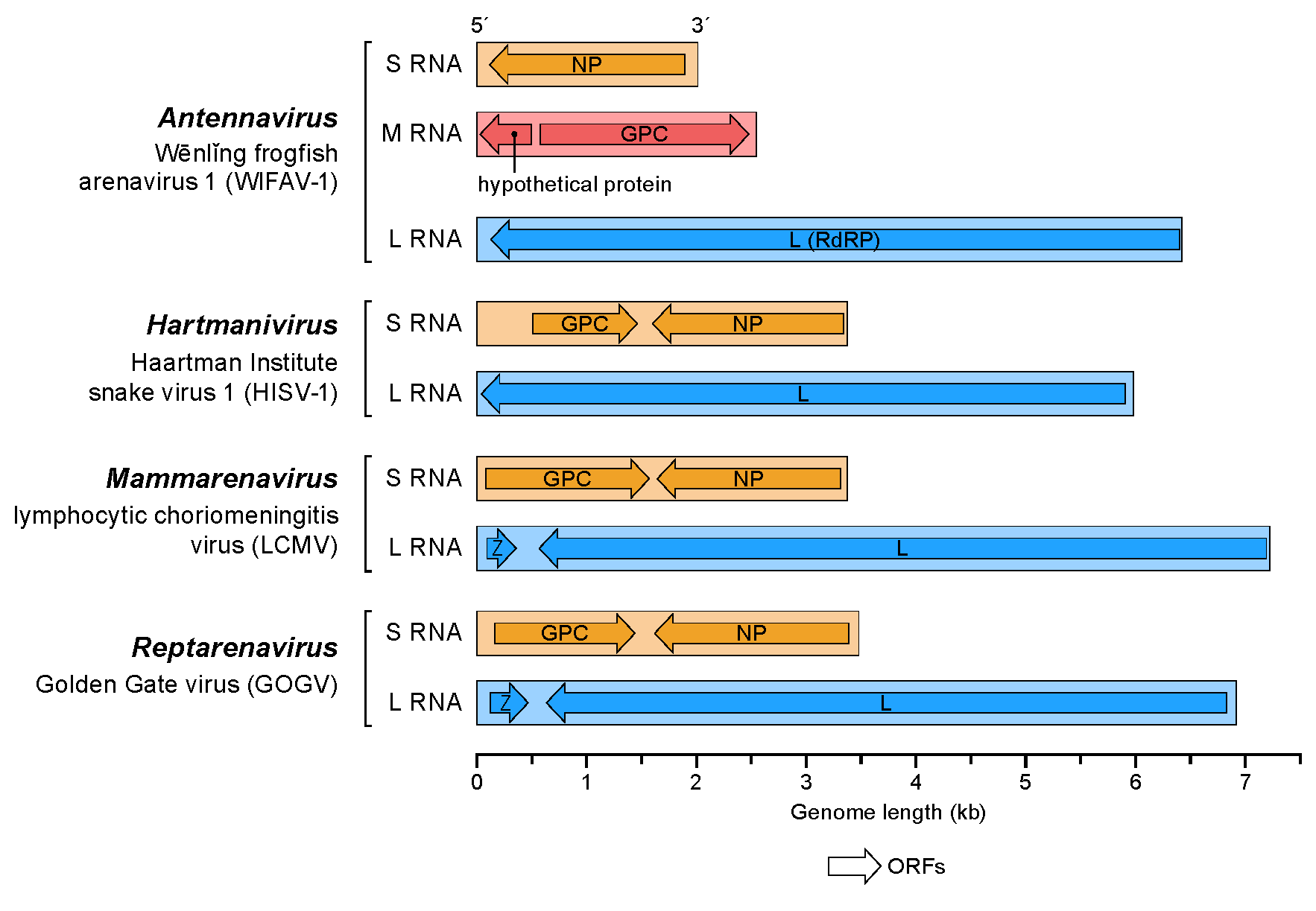
Genomes of Arenaviridae

Arenaviruses have a segmented RNA genome that consists of two single-stranded ambisense RNAs. As with all negative-sense RNA viruses, the genomic RNA alone is not infectious and the viral replication machinery is required to initiate infection within a host cell. Genomic sense RNA packaged into the arenavirus virion is designated negative-sense RNA, and must first be copied into a positive-sense mRNA in order to produce viral protein. The RNA segments are denoted Small (S), Medium (M; if present), and Large (L), and code for four viral proteins in a unique ambisense coding strategy. For mammarenaviruses and reptarenaviruses, each RNA segment codes for two viral proteins in opposite orientation such that the negative-sense RNA genome serves as the template for transcription of a single mRNA and the positive-sense copy of the RNA genome templates a second mRNA. The separate coding sequences of the two viral proteins are divided by an intergenic region RNA sequence that is predicted to fold into a stable hairpin structure.

The extreme termini of each RNA segment contains a 19 nucleotide highly conserved sequence that is critical for recruitment of the viral replication machinery and initiation of viral mRNA transcription and genomic replication. The conserved 5' and 3' RNA termini sequences are complementary and allows each RNA segment to adopt a double-stranded RNA panhandle structure that maintains the termini in close proximity and results in a circular appearance to purified arenavirus genomic templates visualized by electron microscopy. The double-stranded RNA panhandle structure is critical for efficient viral RNA synthesis, but potential interterminal double-stranded RNA interactions must be transiently relieved in order to recruit the viral polymerase.

The S-segment RNA is approximately 3.5 kb, and encodes the viral nucleocapsid protein (NP) and glycoprotein (GPC). The L-segment RNA is approximately 7.2 kb, and encodes the viral RNA-dependent RNA-polymerase (L) and a small RING-domain containing protein (Z).

The Z protein forms homo oligomers and a structural component of the virions. The formation of these oligomers is an essential step for particle assembly and budding. Binding between Z and the viral envelope glycoprotein complex is required for virion infectivity. Z also interacts with the L and NP proteins. Polymerase activity appears to be modulated by the association between the L and Z proteins. Interaction between the Z and NP proteins is critical for genome packaging.

== Microbiology ==
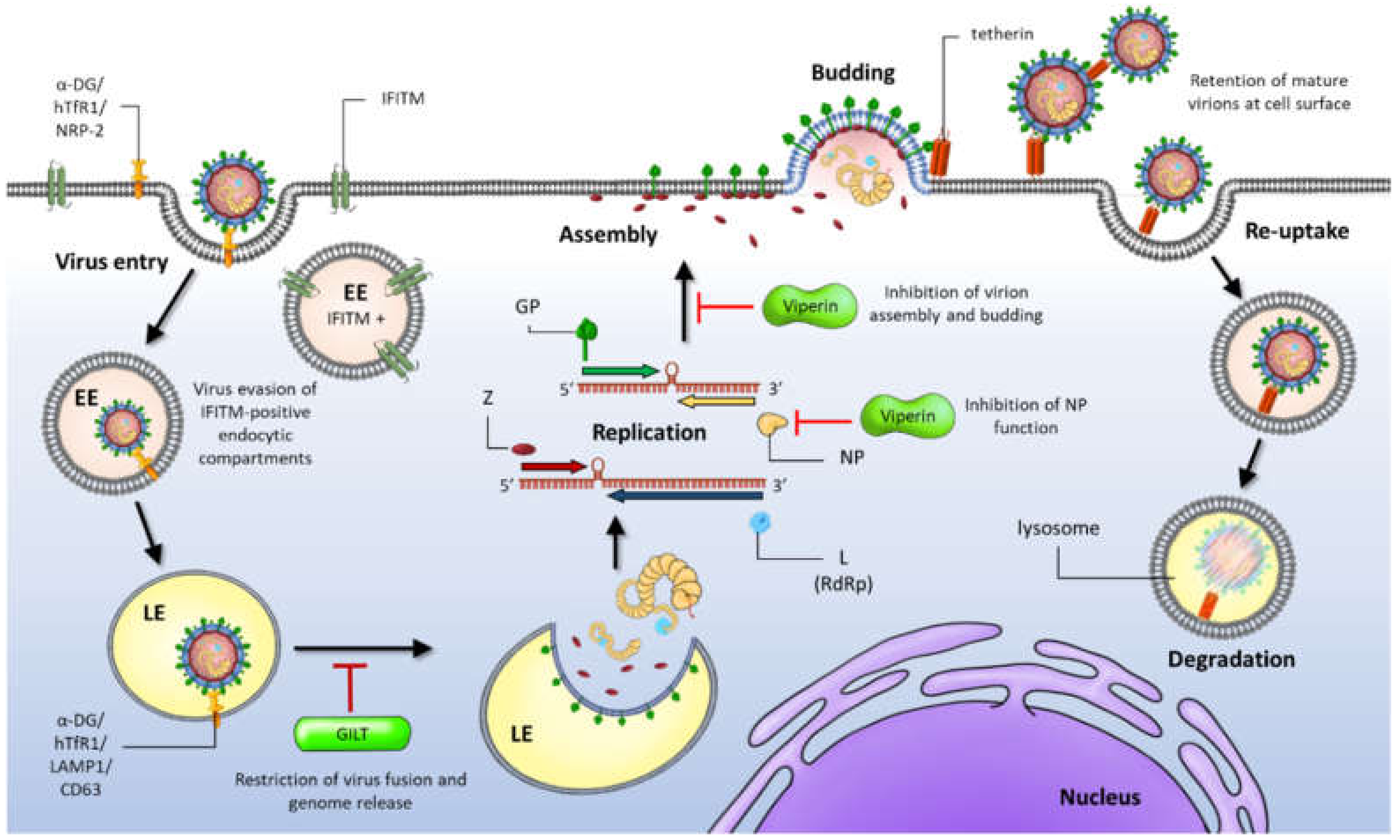
Arenavirus replication cycle.

The glycoprotein (GP) is synthesised as a precursor molecule. It is cleaved into three parts - GP1, GP2 and a stable signal peptide (SSP). These reactions are catalysed by cellular signal peptidases and the cellular enzyme Subtilisin Kexin Isozyme-1 (SKI-1)/Site-1 Protease (S1P). These processes are essential for fusion competence and incorporation of mature GP into nascent budding virion particles.

== Taxonomy ==
Within the family Arenaviridae, arenaviruses were formerly all placed in the genus Arenavirus, but in 2015 were divided into the genera Mammarenavirus for those with mammalian hosts and Reptarenavirus for those infecting snakes. Reptarenaviruses and mammarenavirus are separated by an impenetrable species barrier. Infected rodents cannot pass disease onto snakes, and IBD in captive snakes is not transmissible to humans.

A third genus, Hartmanivirus (not to be confused with genus Haartmanvirus of vibrio phages in family Demerecviridae, order Caudovirales), has also been established, including other species that infect snakes. The organisation of the genome of this genus is typical of arenaviruses but their glycoproteins resemble those of filoviruses. Species in this genus lack the matrix protein.

A fourth genus, Antennavirus, has also been established to accommodate two arenaviruses found in striated frogfish (Antennarius striatus). A third antennavirus has been detected in Chinook salmon and sockeye salmon.

Mammarenaviruses can be divided into two serogroups, which differ genetically and by geographical distribution: When the virus is classified "Old World" this means it was found in the Eastern Hemisphere in places such as Europe, Asia, and Africa. When it is found in the Western Hemisphere, in places such as Argentina, Bolivia, Venezuela, Brazil, and the United States, it is classified "New World". Lymphocytic choriomeningitis (LCM) virus is the only mammarenavirus found worldwide because of its ubiquitous Old World host, the house mouse. Old and New World arenaviruses appear to have diverged ~45,000 years ago. The Old World Mammarenaviruses originated ~23.1-1.88 thousand years ago, most likely in Southern Africa, while the New World Mammarenaviruses evolved in the Latin America-Caribbean region ~41.4-3.3 thousand years ago.

=== Mammarenavirus ===
==== Old World complex ====
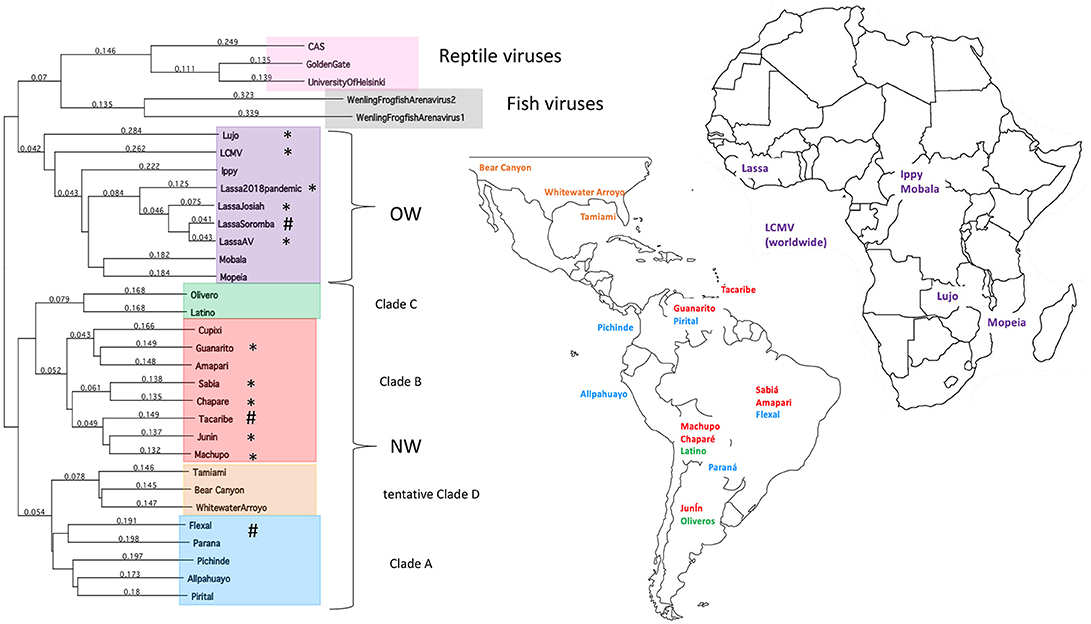
Arenavirus taxonomy and location

- Alxa virus (ALXV)
- Bitu virus (BITV)
- Dandenong virus (DANV)
- Dhati Welel virus (DHWV)
- Gairo virus (GAIV)
- Gbagroube virus
- Ippy virus (IPPYV)
- Kitale virus (KTLV)
- Kodoko virus (KODV)
- Kwanza virus (KWAV)
- Lassa virus (LASV)
- Lìjiāng virus (LIJV)
- Loei River virus (LORV)
- Lujo virus(LUJV)
- Luna virus (LUAV)
- Lunk virus (LNKV)
- Lymphocytic choriomeningitis virus (LCMV)
- Mafiga virus (MAFV)
- Mariental virus (MRTV)
- Merino Walk virus (MRWV)
- Menekre virus
- Minu virus
- Mobala virus (MOBV)
- Mopeia virus (MOPV)
- Morogoro virus (MORV)
- Okahandja virus (OKAV)
- Ryukyu virus (RYKV)
- Solwezi virus (SOLV)
- Souris virus (SOUV)
- Wenzhou virus (WENV)

==== New World complex ====
- Clade A
  - Allpahuayo virus (AALV)
  - Flexal virus (FLEV)
  - Paraná virus (PRAV)
  - Pichindé virus (PICHV)
  - Pirital virus (PIRV)
- Clade B
  - Amaparí virus (AMAV)
  - Aporé virus (APOV)
  - Chapare virus (CHAPV)
  - Cupixi virus (CUPXV)
  - Guanarito virus (GTOV)
  - Junín virus (JUNV)
  - Machupo virus (MACV)
  - Ocozocoautla de Espinosa virus
  - Real de Catorce virus (RCTV)
  - Tacaribe virus (TCRV)
  - Xapuri virus (XAPV)
  - Sabiá virus (SBAV)
- Clade C
  - Latino virus (LATV)
  - Oliveros virus (OLVV)
- Clade D
  - Bear Canyon virus (BCNV)
  - Catarina virus (CTNV)
  - Skinner Tank virus (SKTV)
  - Tamiami virus (TMMV)
  - Whitewater Arroyo virus (WWAV)
  - Catarina virus (CTNV)
  - Big Brushy Tank virus (BBTV)
  - Skinner Tank virus (SKTV)
  - Tonto Creek virus (TTCV)
- Others
  - Patawa virus

=== Reptarenavirus ===
- California reptarenavirus
- Giessen reptarenavirus
- Golden reptarenavirus
- Ordinary reptarenavirus
- Rotterdam reptarenavirus

=== Hartmanivirus ===
- Haartman hartmanivirus
- Heimat hartmanivirus
- Muikkunen hartmanivirus
- Schoolhouse hartmanivirus
- Setpatvet hartmanivirus
- Zurich hartmanivirus

=== Antennavirus ===
- Hairy antennavirus
- Salmon antennavirus
- Striated antennavirus

== Evolution ==
The evolution of the Mammarenavirus genus has been studied. The New World and Old World species diverged less than 45,000 years ago. The New World species evolved between 41,400 and 3,300 years ago in the Latin America-Caribbean region. The Old World species evolved between 23,100 and 1,880 years ago, most likely in southern Africa.

== Reservoirs ==
Some arenaviruses are zoonotic pathogens and are generally associated with rodent—transmitted disease in humans. Each virus usually is associated with a particular rodent host species in which it is maintained. Arenaviruses persist in nature by infecting rodents first and then transmitted into humans. Humans can be infected through mucosal exposure to aerosols, or by direct contact of abraded skin with the infectious material, derived from infected rodents. Aerosols are fine mists or sprays of rodent dried excreta, especially urine that is dropped in the environment. Most of the Arenaviruses caught by humans are within their own homes when these rodents seek shelter. The virus can be caught in factories, from food that has been contaminated, or within agricultural work areas. Humans' risk of contracting the Arenavirus infection is related to age, race, or sex within the degree of contact with the dried rodent excreta.

== Epidemiology ==
=== Hosts ===
Arenavirus diseases and hosts
Virus	Disease	Host	Distribution
Dandenong	Dandenong hemorrhagic fever	Unknown	old world ( Australian cases from Serbia )
Lymphocytic choriomeningitis virus	Lymphocytic choriomeningitis	House mouse (Mus musculus)	Worldwide
Lassa virus	Lassa fever	Natal Multimammate Mouse (Mastomys natalensis)	West Africa
Junin virus	Argentine hemorrhagic fever	Drylands Vesper Mouse (Calomys musculinus)	Argentina
Machupo virus	Bolivian hemorrhagic fever	Large Vesper Mouse (Calomys callosus)	Bolivia
Guanarito virus	Venezuelan hemorrhagic fever	Short-tailed Cane Mouse (Zygodontomys brevicauda)	Venezuela
Sabiá virus	Brazilian hemorrhagic fever	Unknown	Brazil
Tacaribe virus		Bat (Artibeus)	Trinidad
Flexal virus	Influenza-like illness	Rice rat (Oryzomys)	Brazil
Whitewater Arroyo virus	Hemorrhagic fever	Woodrat (Neotoma)	Southwestern United States

=== Clinical diseases ===
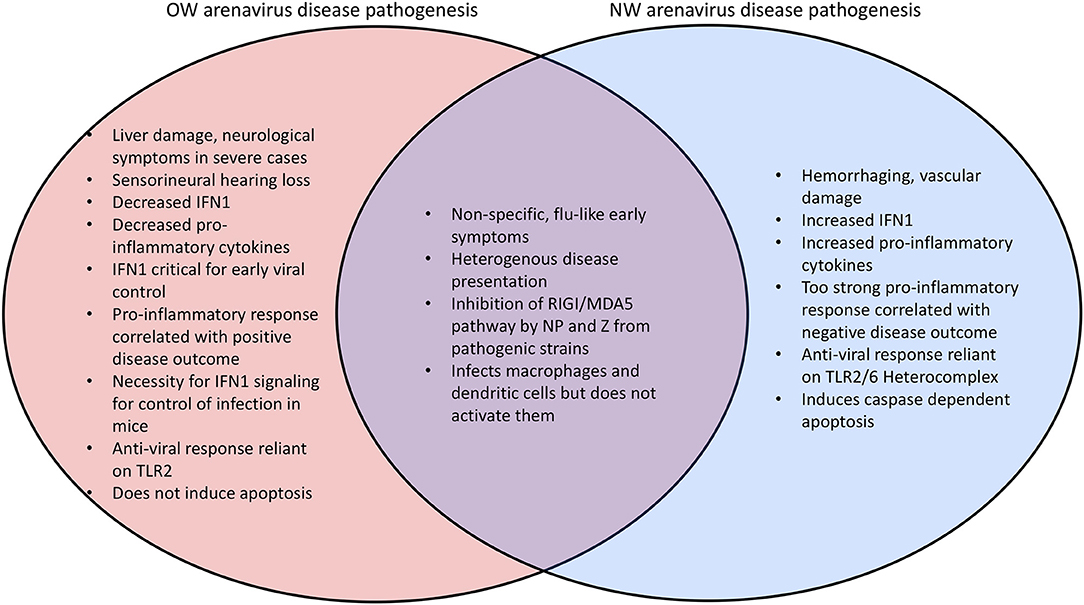
Comparison of disease phenotypes of OW and NW arenaviruses

1. Lymphocytic choriomeningitis (LCM) viruses cause influenza-like febrile illness, but occasionally they may cause meningitis, characteristically accompanied by large numbers of lymphocytes in the cerebrospinal fluid (as the name LCM suggests).
2. Lassa virus causes Lassa fever. Lassa fever is endemic in west Africa. The virus was first isolated from Americans stationed in the village of Lassa, Nigeria. The virus can be transmitted person-to-person.
  - Subclinical diseases: Serological studies suggest that inapparent infections particularly among members of hunting tribes are common.
  - Clinical infections: Lassa fever is characterised by high fever, severe myalgia, coagulopathy, haemorrhagic skin rash, and occasional visceral haemorrhage as well as necrosis of liver and spleen.
3. Other Arenaviruses like Junin virus, Machupo virus cause haemorrhagic fevers.

All of these diseases pose a great threat to public health in the regions where it is taking place. For example, when the Old World Lassa virus turns into Lassa fever, this usually results in a significant amount of mortality. Similarly the New World Junin virus causes Argentine hemorrhagic fever. This fever is a severe illness with hemorrhagic and neurological manifestations and a case fatality of fifteen to thirty percent. The way this virus spreads is through increased traveling to and from endemic regions. This traveling has led to the importation of Lassa fever into non-endemic metropolitan areas all over the world.

=== Recent outbreaks ===
A new species of arenavirus named the Lujo virus has been linked to five patients who exhibited symptoms of viral hemorrhagic fever in South Africa. The disease originated near Lusaka, Zambia and spread to Johannesburg, South Africa, after the first patient was transported to a hospital there. The results of genetic sequencing tests conducted by epidemiologists at Columbia University in New York City, USA, and at the Special Pathogens Branch of the Centers for Disease Control in Atlanta, USA, provided evidence that the causative agent of the disease is a virus from the family Arenaviridae, which ultimately resulted in the deaths of four out of the five infected in Zambia and South Africa during the outbreak which began in September 2008.

Arenavirus has also pinpointed as the cause of death of three donor organ recipients in Australia who contracted the virus after receiving kidney and a liver donations from a single infected organ donor in late 2006. All three died in the first week of 2007.

WHO and its Global Outbreak Alert and Response Network (GOARN) partners continue to support the Ministries of Health of the two countries in various facets of the outbreak investigation, including laboratory diagnosis, investigations, active case finding and follow-up of contacts.

== Treatments ==
Very few treatment methods are available. The current lack of a licensed vaccine and limited therapeutic options for the arenavirus make it arguably among the most neglected virus groups. The only licensed drug for the treatment of human arenavirus infection is the nucleoside analogue ribavirin. Ribavirin reduces morbidity and mortality in humans infected with certain arenaviruses, such as LASV and JUNV infections, if it is taken in the early stages of the disease. Ribavirin displays mixed success in treating severe arenaviral disease and is associated with significant toxicities.

=== Experimental approaches ===
Effective antiviral drugs need to be produced at a low cost, taken orally, and able to withstand tropical climates due to the regions where these infections are occurring. For this reason high throughput screening (HTS) of small molecular libraries could be the answer to finding a better remedy. HTS collects libraries of small synthetic molecules that can be used to identify protein promoting "agonist" molecules or protein inhibiting "antagonist" interactions. With HTS sustainable antiviral drugs can be discovered against possible new human pathogenic viruses.

Immunotherapy is another potential approach. Monoclonal antibodies against Junin virus have been tested in animal models. An immunotherapeutic agent active against all tested mammarenaviruses that use the transferrin receptor 1 as their receptor was under investigation in 2020.
