= Paraná virus =

Virus classification
- (unranked): Virus
- Realm: Riboviria
- Kingdom: Orthornavirae
- Phylum: Negarnaviricota
- Class: Bunyaviricetes
- Order: Hareavirales
- Family: Arenaviridae
- Genus: Mammarenavirus
- Species: Mammarenavirus paranaense

Strains
- 12056 virus

Synonyms
- Parana arenavirus; Paraná mammarenavirus; Paraguayan mammarenavirus

Species of virus

Paraná virus is a virus in the family Arenaviridae. The rodent species Sooretamys angouya is a host of this virus.
