= Latino virus =

Virus classification
- (unranked): Virus
- Realm: Riboviria
- Kingdom: Orthornavirae
- Phylum: Negarnaviricota
- Class: Bunyaviricetes
- Order: Hareavirales
- Family: Arenaviridae
- Genus: Mammarenavirus
- Species: Mammarenavirus latinum

Type strain
- 10924 virus

Synonyms
- Latino mammarenavirus

Species of virus

Latino virus (Mammarenavirus latinum) is a species of virus in the family Arenaviridae. Its host is the rodent Calomys callosus, and it was isolated in Bolivia.
