= Viral hemorrhagic fever =

Family of infectious diseases

- Other names: viral haemorrhagic fever
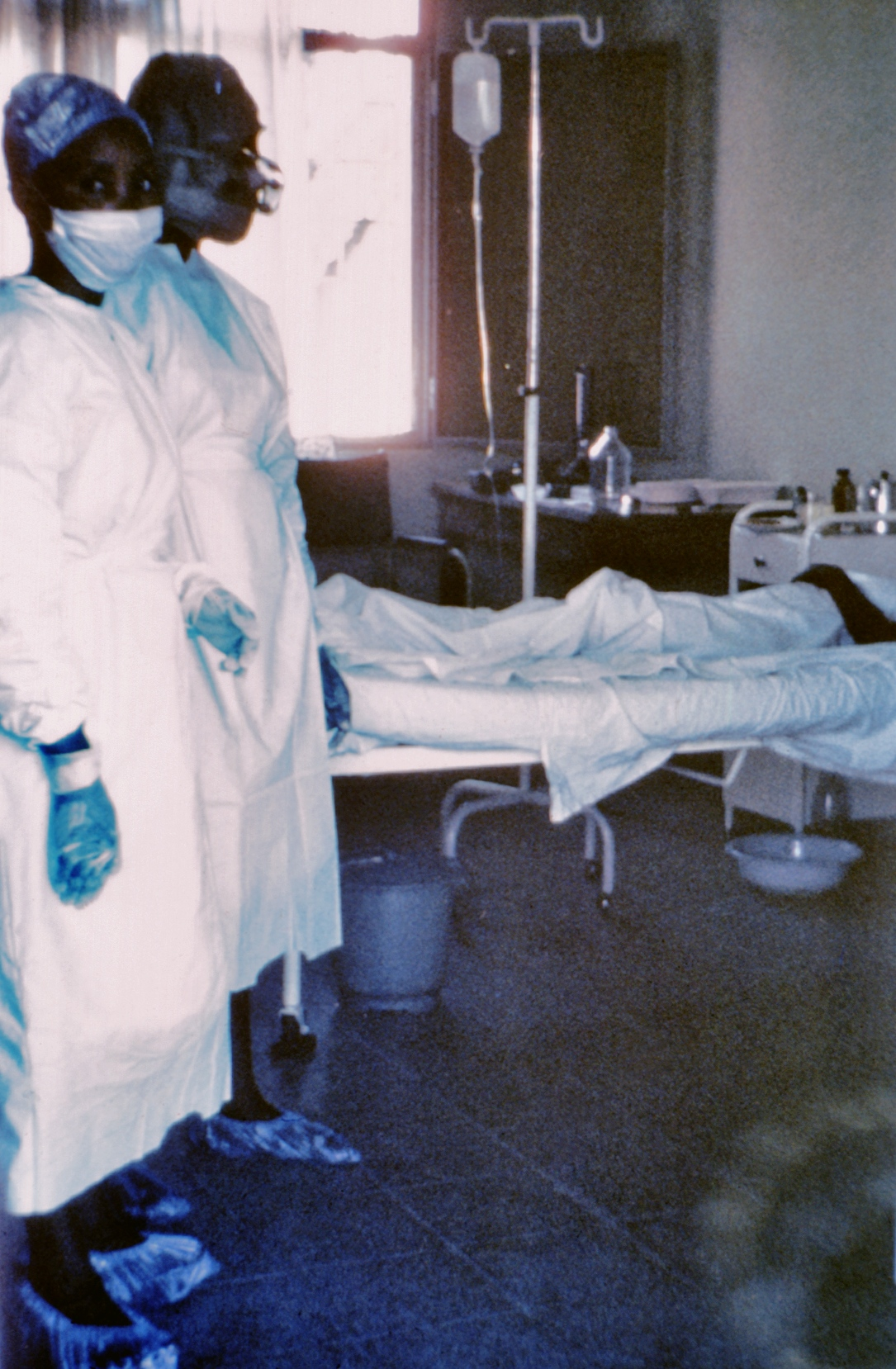
- Two nurses standing near Mayinga N'Seka, a nurse with Ebola virus disease in the 1976 outbreak in Zaire. N'Seka died a few days later due to severe internal hemorrhage.
- Specialty: Infectious disease

Viral hemorrhagic fevers (VHFs) are a diverse group of infectious diseases characterized by fever and systemic damage to the circulatory system caused by RNA viruses. Viral hemorrhagic fevers cause symptoms ranging from mild to life-threatening, depending on the virus involved, but generally cause internal bleeding that leads to sudden onset of muscle pain, fever, and hypotension. In severe cases, it can cause life-threatening shock and bleeding from internal organs.

While some VHFs are generally mild, such as nephropathia epidemica (caused by two species of hantavirus), many are debilitating or lethal without treatment. Outbreaks of VHFs tend to have high case fatality rates and disproportionately affect communities with poor health infrastructure. Therefore, the emergence of VHFs is a growing public health concern. VHFs are often zoonoses, meaning they can be transmitted from wild animals to human populations; for instance, the Lassa arenavirus is spread by mice. Viral hemorrhagic fevers are caused by members of seven families of single-stranded RNA viruses: Arenaviridae, Filoviridae, Flaviviridae, Nairoviridae, Phenuiviridae, Hantaviridae and Peribunyaviridae. (Note: Henipaviruses are not included in the list as they are not traditionally classified as VHFs. The family containing Ngari virus is included as it has been isolated in previous studies. The family of Bas-Congo virus is not included as it has not been isolated and has only been found in one patient.)

== Symptoms ==
Signs and symptoms of most or all viral hemorrhagic fevers can be divided into "wet" and "dry" symptoms. The disease typically progresses from dry symptoms to wet symptoms.

=== Dry symptoms ===
- Headache
- Malaise (a general feeling of sickness)
- Fever (high body temperature)
- Hypotension (low blood pressure)
- Flushing (redness) of the face and chest
- Myalgia (muscle pain)

=== Wet symptoms ===
- Circulatory shock
- Diarrhea (feces which resemble more liquid than solid)
- Hemorrhage (bleeding) and sometimes bleeding diathesis (a person loses more blood than usual from an injury – for example, getting only a little cut, and losing a lot of blood)
- Petechiae (small red or purple spots)
- Swelling caused by edema

The severity of symptoms varies with both individual immune competence and the type of virus. The "VHF syndrome" causes bleeding diathesis, capillary leak, and circulatory shock. It happens to most people who have Filoviridae infections (such as Ebola virus or Marburg virus), Crimean–Congo hemorrhagic fever (CCHF), or the South American hemorrhagic fevers (which are caused by Arenaviridae). VHF syndrome only happens to a small minority of people who have dengue fever or Rift Valley fever.

== Causes ==
All known viruses causing hemorrhagic fever are part of the Orthornavirae kingdom.

- The order Hareavirales includes the families Arenaviridae, Nairoviridae and Phenuiviridae

- The family Arenaviridae includes the viruses responsible for Lassa fever (Lassa virus), Lujo virus, Argentine (Junin virus), Bolivian (Machupo virus), Brazilian (Sabiá virus), Chapare hemorrhagic fever (Chapare virus), Venezuelan (Guanarito virus), and Whitewater Arroyo virus hemorrhagic fevers.
- The family Nairoviridae includes the Crimean-Congo hemorrhagic fever (CCHF) virus from the genus Orthonairovirus.
- The family Phenuiviridae includes the Rift Valley fever (RVF) virus from the genus Phlebovirus.

- The order Elliovirales includes the families Peribunyaviridae and Hantaviridae.

- The family Hantaviridae includes the causative agents of Hantavirus hemorrhagic fever with renal syndrome (HV-HFRS).
- The family Peribunyaviridae includes the Ngari virus.

- The order Mononegavirales contains the family Filoviridae.

- The family Filoviridae includes Ebola virus and Marburg virus.

- The order Amarillovirales includes the family Flaviviridae.

- The family Flaviviridae includes dengue, yellow fever, and two viruses in the tick-borne encephalitis group that cause VHF: Omsk hemorrhagic fever virus and Kyasanur Forest disease virus.

In September 2012 scientists reported the discovery of a member of the Rhabdoviridae family potentially causing hemorrhagic fever. In a 2009 outbreak of acute hemorrhagic fever they discovered a new viral genome in one of the three people affected. The virus was named Bas-Congo virus. The virus could not be isolated and has since then not been detected in any other patient, raising doubts on whether the virus is actually the causative agent of a disease.

== Pathophysiology ==
Different hemorrhagic fever viruses act on the body differently, resulting in variable symptoms. In most VHFs, several mechanisms likely contribute to symptoms, including liver damage, disseminated intravascular coagulation (DIC), and bone marrow dysfunction. In DIC, small blood clots form in blood vessels throughout the body, removing platelets necessary for clotting from the bloodstream and reducing clotting ability. DIC is thought to cause bleeding in Rift Valley, Marburg, and Ebola fevers. For filoviral hemorrhagic fevers, there are four general mechanisms of pathogenesis. The first mechanism is the dissemination of the virus due to suppressed responses by macrophages and dendritic cell (antigen-presenting cells). The second mechanism is prevention of antigen specific immune response. The third mechanism is apoptosis of lymphocytes. The fourth mechanism is when infected macrophages interact with toxic cytokines, leading to diapedesis and coagulation deficiency. From the vascular perspective, the virus will infect vascular endothelial cells, leading to the reorganization of the VE-cadherin catenin complex (a protein important in cell adhesion). This reorganization creates intercellular gaps in endothelial cells. The gaps lead to increased endothelial permeability and allow blood to escape from the vascular circulatory system.

The reasons for variation among patients infected with the same virus are unknown but stem from a complex system of virus-host interactions. Dengue fever becomes more virulent during a second infection by means of antibody-dependent enhancement. After the first infection, macrophages display antibodies on their cell membranes specific to the dengue virus. By attaching to these antibodies, dengue viruses from a second infection are better able to infect the macrophages, thus reducing the immune system's ability to fight off infection.

== Diagnosis ==
Definitive diagnosis is usually made at a reference laboratory with advanced biocontainment capabilities. The findings of laboratory investigation vary somewhat between the viruses but in general, there is a decrease in the total white cell count (particularly the lymphocytes), a decrease in the platelet count, an increase in the blood serum liver enzymes, and reduced blood clotting ability measured as an increase in both the prothrombin (PT) and activated partial thromboplastin times (PTT). The hematocrit may be elevated. The serum urea and creatine may be raised but this is dependent on the hydration status of the patient. The bleeding time tends to be prolonged.

Labs can use RT-PCR to detect the genetic material of the virus, or an ELISA test in later stages to detect antibodies produced by the immune system.

== Prevention ==
With the exception of yellow fever vaccine and Ebola vaccines, vaccines for VHFs are generally not available. For someone exposed to CCHF, ribavirin is available as post-exposure prophylaxis (PEP). Ribavirin may also help in exposure to Lassa fever.

Any person who is taking care of a patient with any VHF should take multiple precautions against exposure and infection. The precautions include hand hygiene, double gloves, gowns, shoe and leg coverings, and face shields or goggles. Treatment of any VHF should involve careful donning (putting on) and doffing (taking off) procedures for PPE. A Trained Observer, or TO, is used to monitor the donning/doffing process. Lassa, CCHF, Ebola, and Marburg viruses may be particularly prone to nosocomial (hospital-based) spread. Airborne precautions should be utilized including, at a minimum, a fit-tested, HEPA filter-equipped respirator (such as an N95 mask), a battery-powered, air-purifying respirator, or a positive pressure supplied air respirator to be worn by personnel coming within 1.8 metres (six feet) of a VHF patient. Groups of patients should be cohorted (sequestered) to a separate building or a ward with an isolated air-handling system. Environmental decontamination is typically accomplished with hypochlorite (e.g. bleach) or phenolic disinfectants.

Some VHF patients, notably those infected with Marburg and Ebola, are at their most infectious after death. Strict precautions should be taken including the safe transport and disinfection of the body.

== Management ==
Medical management of VHF patients may require intensive supportive care. Antiviral therapy with intravenous ribavirin may be useful in Bunyaviridae and Arenaviridae infections (specifically Lassa fever, RVF, CCHF, and HFRS due to Old World Hantavirus infection) and can be used only under an experimental protocol as IND approved by the U.S. Food and Drug Administration (FDA). Interferon may be effective in Argentine or Bolivian hemorrhagic fevers (also available only as IND).

== Potential therapies ==
A potential novel treatment, the NMT inhibitor, has been shown to completely inhibit Lassa (LAS) and Junín (JUN) viral infections in cells based assays. Another host-directed antiviral acts on EPRS1 which in turn acts, in human cells, as a proviral factor in mammarenaviruses infection, including LCMV, JUNV, and LASV, and its inhibition using halofuginon compound, a prolyl domain inhibitor of EPRS1, completely abolishes the viral infection by interrupting viral assembly and budding. PKR has been shown to act as a proviral factor while the inhibition of its kinase activity restricted the virus replication and infectivity.

== Biowarfare potential ==
The VHF viruses are spread in a variety of ways. Some may be transmitted to humans through a respiratory route. The viruses are considered by military medical planners to have a potential for aerosol dissemination, weaponization, or likelihood for confusion with similar agents that might be weaponized.

Scientific Research Institute of Medicine of the Ministry of Defense in Sergiyev Posad was researching the military use potential of hemorrhagic fever viruses.

== See also ==
- Biosafety
- Jordi Casals-Ariet
- Dr. Matthew Lukwiya (1957–2000)
- C. J. Peters
