= Pichindé virus =

Virus classification
- (unranked): Virus
- Realm: Riboviria
- Kingdom: Orthornavirae
- Phylum: Negarnaviricota
- Class: Bunyaviricetes
- Order: Hareavirales
- Family: Arenaviridae
- Genus: Mammarenavirus
- Species: Mammarenavirus caliense

Strains
- 3739 virus

Synonyms
- Pichinde virus; Pichindé mammarenavirus; Cali mammarenavirus

Species of virus

Pichindé virus (Mammarenavirus caliense) is a species of virus in the family Arenaviridae.
