= Brazilian hemorrhagic fever =

Infectious disease caused by Sabiá virus

- Specialty: Infectious disease

Sabiá virus

Virus classification
- (unranked): Virus
- Realm: Riboviria
- Kingdom: Orthornavirae
- Phylum: Negarnaviricota
- Class: Bunyaviricetes
- Order: Hareavirales
- Family: Arenaviridae
- Genus: Mammarenavirus
- Species: Mammarenavirus brazilense

Synonyms
- Sabiá mammarenavirus; Sabiá virus; SPH 114202 virus; Brazilian mammarenavirus

Brazilian hemorrhagic fever (BzHF) is an infectious disease caused by Sabiá virus, an arenavirus. Sabiá virus is one of the arenaviruses from South America to cause hemorrhagic fever. It shares a common progenitor with Junín virus, Machupo virus, Tacaribe virus, and Guanarito virus. It is an enveloped RNA virus and is highly infectious and lethal. Very little is known about this disease, but it is thought to be transmitted by the excreta of rodents. This virus has also been implicated as a means for bioterrorism, as it can be spread through aerosols.

As of 2019, there had only been four documented infections of Sabiá virus: two occurred naturally, and the other two cases occurred in the clinical setting. The first naturally occurring case was in 1990, when a female agricultural engineer who was staying in the neighborhood of Jardim Sabiá in the municipality of Cotia, a suburb of São Paulo, Brazil contracted the disease. She presented with hemorrhagic fever and died. Her autopsy showed liver necrosis. A virologist who was studying the woman's disease contracted the virus but survived. Ribavirin was not given in these first two cases. Four years later, in 1994, a researcher was exposed to the virus in a level 3 biohazard facility at Yale University when a centrifuge bottle cracked, leaked, and released aerosolized virus particles. He was successfully treated with ribavirin.

A fourth case, also naturally acquired in upstate São Paulo, was reported in January 2020. The patient died 12 days after the onset of symptoms.

== Treatment ==
Ribavirin is thought to be effective in treating the illness, similar to other arenaviruses. Compared to the patients who did not receive ribavirin, the patient who was treated with it had a shorter and less severe clinical course. Symptomatic control such as fluids to address dehydration and bleeding may also be required.

Sabiá virus is a biosafety Level 4 pathogen.
