= Venezuelan hemorrhagic fever =

Guanarito virus

Virus classification
- (unranked): Virus
- Realm: Riboviria
- Kingdom: Orthornavirae
- Phylum: Negarnaviricota
- Class: Bunyaviricetes
- Order: Hareavirales
- Family: Arenaviridae
- Genus: Mammarenavirus
- Species: Mammarenavirus guanaritoense

Synonyms
- Guanarito mammarenavirus

Venezuelan hemorrhagic fever
- Specialty: Infectious disease

Venezuelan hemorrhagic fever (VHF) is a zoonotic human illness first identified in 1989. The disease is most prevalent in several rural areas of central Venezuela and is caused by Guanarito virus (GTOV) which belongs to the Arenaviridae family. The short-tailed cane mouse (Zygodontomys brevicauda) is the main host for GTOV which is spread mostly by inhalation of aerosolized droplets of saliva, respiratory secretions, urine, or blood from infected rodents. Person-to-person spread is possible, but uncommon.

== Presentation ==
VHF has many similarities to Lassa fever and to the arenavirus hemorrhagic fevers that occur in Argentina and Bolivia. It causes fever and malaise followed by hemorrhagic manifestations and convulsions. Some presentations of the virus are also characterized by vascular damage, bleeding diathesis, fever, and multiple organ involvement. Clinical diagnosis of VHF has proven to be difficult based on the nonspecific symptoms. The disease is fatal in 30% of cases and is endemic to Portuguesa state and Barinas state in Venezuela.

Treatment and prevention for the VHF virus are limited and there are currently no licensed vaccines available that can act to prevent the disease. However, once infected, ribavirin, an anti-viral drug given intravenously, is one way to treat VHF.

== Virus ==
Arenaviruses are enveloped, single-stranded, bisegmented RNA viruses with antisense genomes. Based on their antigenic properties, arenaviruses have been classified into two major groups: the Old World arenaviruses, and the New World arenaviruses. Old World arenaviruses include lymphocytic choriomeningitis virus and Lassa virus. New world arena viruses are further broken down into three clades, A, B, and C. The Guanarito arena virus belongs to clade B and is the cause of VHF. On the biosafety level scale of one to four, with four causing the most risk, the viruses causing hemorrhagic fevers have been assigned a four by the CDC.

== Host ==
The short-tailed cane mouse, the main host of GTOV, is native to western Venezuela and resides in large numbers in tall grass, cultivated agricultural fields, human homes, and outbuildings. It is speculated that demographic and ecological changes in the rural areas increased the frequency of contact between humans and infected rodents such that VHF emerged.

== History ==
From September 1989 through December 2006, the State of Portuguesa recorded 618 cases of VHF. Nearly all of the cases were individuals who worked or lived in Guanarito during the time they became infected. The case fatality rate was 23.1%.

Because the virus is contracted by aerosol dissemination, concern arose shortly after the first cases emerged in 1989 due to fear of biological warfare. Potential biological terrorism agents were identified and categorized in 1999 by the Centers for Disease Control and Prevention (CDC) as part of the Congressional initiative to further response capabilities to biological weapons. Arenaviruses causing hemorrhagic fevers, along with a genus of virus called filoviruses, were categorized in Category A; these are pathogens with the highest potential impact on public health safety.

A notable event in the timeline of this virus' scientific knowledge was the unexplained disappearance of a vial of the virus at the University of Texas Medical Branch Galveston National Laboratory, announced 2013 March 24.
