= Lymphocytic choriomeningitis =

Rodent-borne viral infectious disease

- Other names: Benign lymphocytic meningitis, lymphocytic meningoencephalitis, serous lymphocytic meningitis, la maladie d'Armstrong
- Specialty: Infectious disease

Lymphocytic choriomeningitis (LCM) is a rodent-borne viral infectious disease that presents as aseptic meningitis, encephalitis or meningoencephalitis. Its causative agent is lymphocytic choriomeningitis virus (LCMV), a member of the family Arenaviridae. The name was coined by Charles Armstrong in 1934.

Lymphocytic choriomeningitis is "a viral infection of the membranes surrounding the brain and spinal cord and of the cerebrospinal fluid". The name is based on the tendency of an individual to have abnormally high levels of lymphocytes during infection. Choriomeningitis is "cerebral meningitis in which there is marked cellular infiltration of the meninges, often with a lymphocytic infiltration of the choroid plexuses".

== Signs and symptoms ==
LCMV infection manifests itself in a wide range of clinical symptoms, and may even be asymptomatic for immunocompetent individuals. Onset typically occurs between one or two weeks after exposure to the virus and is followed by a biphasic febrile illness. During the initial or prodromal phase, which may last up to a week, common symptoms include fever, lack of appetite, headache, muscle aches, malaise, nausea, and/or vomiting. Less frequent symptoms include a sore throat and cough, as well as joint, chest, and parotid pain. The onset of the second phase occurs several days after recovery, and consists of symptoms of meningitis or encephalitis. Pathological findings during the first stage consist of leukopenia and thrombocytopenia. During the second phase, typical findings include elevated protein levels, increased leukocyte count, or a decrease in glucose levels of the cerebrospinal fluid).

== Cause ==
=== Virology ===
Lymphocytic choriomeningitis virus
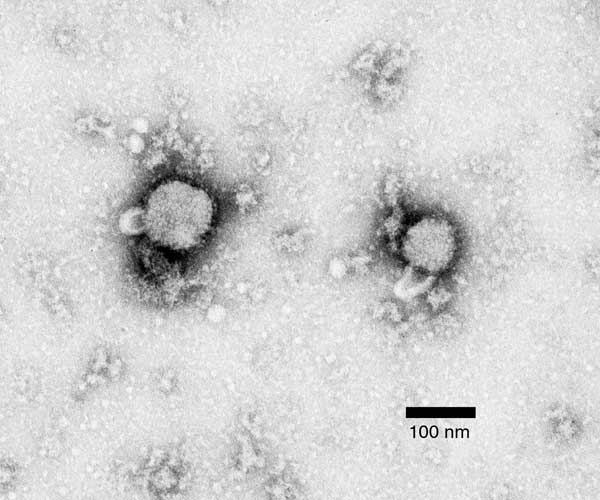
- Negative stain electron micrograph of an arenavirus from a mouse that tested positive for LCM

Virus classification
- (unranked): Virus
- Realm: Riboviria
- Kingdom: Orthornavirae
- Phylum: Negarnaviricota
- Class: Bunyaviricetes
- Order: Hareavirales
- Family: Arenaviridae
- Genus: Mammarenavirus
- Species: Mammarenavirus choriomeningitidis

Synonyms
- Lymphocytic choriomeningitis mammarenavirus

There are several strains of LCM virus, among which the most widely used are LCMV Armstrong and LCMV Clone 13. Armstrong is the original virus strain which was isolated from the brain by Charles Armstrong in 1934. It triggers a vigorous cytotoxic T lymphocytes (CTL) response and thus, it is cleared rapidly by the host. This is referred to as acute (Armstrong) LCMV infection. On the other hand, Clone 13 is a variant of the Armstrong viral strain, isolated from the spleen and is consequently tropic for visceral organs. It was first isolated from mice which sustained a persistent LCMV infection from birth. This variant potentiates a less vigorous CTL response in the immune system, and thus can ultimately persist in the host organism indefinitely. The latter is referred to as chronic (Clone 13) LCMV infection.

LCMV is a spherical enveloped virus with a diameter between 60 and 300 nm. The helical nucleocapsid contains an RNA genome consisting of two negative single-stranded RNA segments. The negative RNA strand, complementary to the necessary mRNA strand, indicates that it must first be transcribed into a positive mRNA strand before it can be translated into the required proteins. The L strand is ambisense RNA, encoding multiple proteins in opposite directions, separated by an intergenic region. It is approximately 7.2 kb in size and encodes a high-molecular-mass protein (L; 200 kDa) and an 11 kDa small polypeptide Z with unknown function and a ring finger motif. The viral RNA-dependent RNA polymerase is encoded by the L protein which contains conserved characteristic motifs throughout all the RNA-dependent, RNA-polymerases. The S strand is ambisense and approximately 3.4 kb in size. It encodes the two main structural proteins: nucleo-protein (NP) (63 kDa) and glycoprotein precursor complex (GPC) (75 kDa). The latter undergoes posttranslational cleavage at two separate steps: first in the endoplasmic reticulum, where following translation on the membrane, the stable signal peptide region is cleaved by signal peptidase (SPase); notably, this signal peptide is retained, in contrast to other viruses. The second cleavage occurs at the Golgi apparatus, where GP1-GP2, having been trafficked to the Golgi, is cleaved into separate mature viral glycoproteins, GP1 and GP2 (with cleavage mediated by SK1-/PS1 or MBTPS1). The spikes present on the virion envelope are dictated by tetramer formation of GP-1 and GP-2.

When LCMV attacks a cell, the process of replication starts by attachment of the virus to host receptors through its surface glycoproteins. It is then endocytosed into a vesicle inside the host cell and creates a fusion of the virus and vesicle membranes. The ribonucleocapsid is then released in the cytoplasm. The RNA-dependent, RNA-polymerase brought along with the virus initially binds to a promoter on the L and S segments and begins transcription from negative-stranded to a positive-stranded mRNA. The formation of a strong hairpin sequence at the end of each gene terminates transcription. The mRNA strands are capped by the RNA-dependent, RNA-polymerase in the cytoplasm and are then subsequently translated into the four proteins essential for LCMV assembly. The ribonucleocapsid interacts with the Z matrix protein and buds on the cell membrane, releasing the virion out from the infected cell. Recent research has suggested that LCMV is also able to infect neighbouring cells independently of budding and release via intercellular membrane/cytoplasmic projections known as tunneling nanotubes. This transfer of components between cells without release into the extracellular environment is believed to be a mechanism of immune evasion employed by the virus.

The first arenavirus, Lymphocytic choriomeningitis virus (LCMV), was isolated in 1933 by Charles Armstrong during a study of an epidemic in St. Louis. Although not the cause of the outbreak, LCMV was found to be a cause of nonbacterial or aseptic meningitis.

In 1996, Peter Doherty and Rolf Zinkernagel shared the Nobel Prize in Medicine and Physiology, for their work with LCMV which led to a fundamental understanding of the adaptive immune response, MHC restriction. In the 1970s, studies concerning the importance of MHC locus were done exclusively in transplantation and tumor rejection. Taking this into consideration, Doherty and Zinkernagel were working on the response of mice to virus infections. They observed that T-cell receptors must recognise a complex of foreign antigen and an MHC antigen in order to destroy infected cells. Their key experiment involved harvesting of splenocytes containing LCMV-specific cytotoxic T lymphocytes (CTL) from an infected mouse strain A. These were then mixed in vitro with virus infected fibroblasts or macrophages from two different mouse strains, A and B. By the method of Cr-release cytotoxicity assay, thereby tagging the CTL with chromium-51 (Cr-51), the CTL destruction of infected cells was quantified by release of Cr-51. The results showed that CTL killed only the infected cells from strain A, and they did not lyse uninfected cells or infected cells from strain B. They concluded that these virus specific CTLs only lyse cells carrying the same molecules of the major histocompatibility site (MHC) as the CTLs themselves. Thus, the virus-specific CTLs are "MHC-restricted". This discovery lead to a greater understanding of an important aspect of the immune system.

=== Spread ===
LCMV is naturally spread by the common house mouse, Mus musculus. Once infected, these mice can become chronically infected by maintaining virus in their blood or persistently shedding virus in their urine. Chronically infected female mice usually transmit infection to their offspring (vertical transmission), which in turn become chronically infected. Other modes of mouse-to-mouse transmission include nasal secretions, milk from infected dams, bites, and during social grooming within mouse communities. Airborne transmission also occurs.

The virus seems to be relatively resistant to drying and therefore humans can become infected by inhaling infectious aerosolized particles of rodent urine, feces, or saliva, by ingesting food contaminated with virus, by contamination of mucous membranes with infected body fluids, or by directly exposing cuts or other open wounds to virus-infected blood. The only documented cases of transmission from animals have occurred between humans and mice or hamsters.

Cases of lymphocytic choriomeningitis have been reported in North and South America, Europe, Australia, and Japan, particularly during the 1900s. However, infection may occur wherever an infected rodent host population exists.

Seroprevalence is approximately 5% (0.7–4.7%) of the US population. It tends to be more common among lower socio-economic groupings, probably reflecting more frequent and direct contacts with mice. However, obtaining an accurate sense of prevalence by geographic region is difficult due to underreporting.

==== Congenital infection ====
Lymphocytic choriomeningitis is a particular concern in obstetrics, as vertical transmission is known to occur. For immunocompetent mothers, there is no significant threat, but the virus has damaging effects upon the fetus. If infection occurs during the first trimester, LCMV results in an increased risk of spontaneous abortion. Later congenital infection may lead to malformations such as intracranial calcifications, hydrocephalus, microcephaly or macrocephaly, intellectual disabilities, and seizures. Other findings include chorioretinal scars, and optic atrophy. Mortality among infants is approximately 30%. Among the survivors, two-thirds have lasting neurologic abnormalities.

If a woman has come into contact with a rodent during pregnancy and LCM symptoms are manifested, a blood test is available to determine previous or current infection. A history of infection does not pose a risk for future pregnancies.

==== Organ donation ====
In May 2005, four solid-organ transplant recipients contracted an illness that was later diagnosed as lymphocytic choriomeningitis. All received organs from a common donor, and within a month of transplantation, three of the four recipients had died as a result of the viral infection. Epidemiologic investigation traced the source to a pet hamster that the organ donor had recently purchased from a Rhode Island pet store. Similar cases occurred in Australia in 2006 and Massachusetts in 2008. There is not a LCMV infection test that is approved by the Food and Drug Administration for organ donor screening. The Morbidity and Mortality Weekly Report advises health-care providers to "consider LCMV infection in patients with aseptic meningitis and encephalitis and in organ transplant recipients with unexplained fever, hepatitis, or multisystem organ failure."

== Diagnosis ==
Current or previous infection can be detected through a blood test. However, some authors note that such complement-fixation tests are insensitive and should not be used for diagnosis. Dr. Clare A. Dykewicz, et al. state,

Infection with LCMV should be considered in the differential diagnosis of any compatible, severe viral infection or aseptic meningitis, especially when there is a history of occupational exposure to laboratory rodents. Timeliness of diagnosis is important not only in expediting treatment of infected persons, but also in preventing further LCMV transmission to other workers and animals.

Clinical diagnosis of LCM can be made by the history of prodrome symptoms and by considering the period of time before the onset of meningitis symptoms, typically 15–21 days for LCM.

Pathological diagnosis of congenital infection is performed using either an immunofluorescent antibody (IFA) test or an enzyme immunoassay to detect specific antibody in blood or cerebrospinal fluid. A PCR assay has been recently developed which may be used in the future for prenatal diagnosis; however, the virus is not always present in the blood or CSF when the affected child is born." Diagnoses is subject to methodological shortcomings in regard to specificity and sensitivity of assays used. For this reason, LCMV may be more common than is realized.

Another detection assay is the reverse transcription polymerase chain reaction.

== Prevention ==
Studies have indicated that human infection of the virus occurs primarily during the fall and winter months, presumably due to the movement of mice indoors. Several measures can be taken to prevent exposure to LCM from wild rodents in the home. A checklist of precautions is provided by the Centers for Disease Control and Prevention, providing tips for sealing the home to keep rodents out, using traps to eliminate existing rodents, and maintaining a clean, healthy home. New technology reflects a growing trend for more humane means of eliminating rodents. Products include devices that emit ultrasonic sound that allegedly irritates mice and drives them away, and more swift, painless means of death such as mini electrocution or gas chambers. However, the traditional snap trap remains an economic and popular option.

== Treatment ==
Nucleoside analog ribavirin is used in some cases due to the inhibitory effect the agent has in vitro on arenaviruses. However, there is not sufficient evidence for efficacy in humans to support routine use. Early and intravenous ribavirin treatment is required for maximal efficacy, and it can produce considerable side effects. Ribavirin has not been evaluated yet in controlled clinical trials.

Use of ribavirin during pregnancy is generally not recommended, as some studies indicate the possibility of teratogenic effects. If aseptic meningitis, encephalitis, or meningoencephalitis develops in consequence to LCMV, hospitalization and supportive treatment may be required. In some circumstances, anti-inflammatory drugs may also be considered. In general, mortality is less than one percent. Host-directed antivirals have shown potentials in cell based assays, a potential novel treatment, the NMT inhibitor, has been shown to completely inhibit LCM infection in cells based assays. EPRS1 acts, in human cells, as a proviral factor in mammarenaviruses infection, including LASV, and its inhibition using halofuginon compound, a prolyl domain inhibitor of EPRS1, completely abolishes the viral infection by interrupting viral assembly and budding. PKR has been shown to act as a proviral factor while the inhibition of its kinase activity restricted the virus replication and infectivity.

== Prognosis ==
The island of Vir in Croatia is one of the biggest described endemic places of origin of LCMV in the world, with IFA testing having found LCMV antibodies in 36% of the population. Temperature and time of year is also a critical factor that contributes to the number of LCMV infections.

== Epidemiology ==
The presence of LCMV in laboratories may cause serious long-term repercussions to worker safety. In 1989, an outbreak among humans occurred in a US cancer research institute that studied the effects of various therapeutic and diagnostic agents in animal models. Such agents had been developed in the animal care facility, which periodically screened sentinel animals for extraneous infection. Due to an oversight, no sentinel animals were monitored from August 1988 to March 1989. When testing resumed, LCMV antibodies were found in the oldest sentinel hamsters. Several workers reported symptoms consistent with LCMV infection, leading to an investigation. Blood samples were obtained and tested for LCMV antibodies. Of the 82 workers that were tested, seven had definite serologic evidence of past LCMV infection, and two were hospitalized for an acute febrile illness. All seven reported direct contact with the animals at the institute.

An additional hazard associated with LCMV in laboratories misleading experimental results. Interference with research may involve:

[Inhibition of] tumor induction due to polyoma virus, and mammary tumor virus in the mouse, and [interference] with transplantable leukaemia in the guinea pig and the mouse. Infection is associated with depression of cellular immunity in the mouse. Rejection of cutaneous grafts or transplantable tumors may be delayed. In addition, infection will increase the sensitivity of the mouse to ectromelia virus and to bacterial endotoxins.

Reported outbreaks have decreased, perhaps due to improved biohazard management in laboratories. However, it is possible that sporadic cases have been overlooked because of the wide range of clinical presentations. Clare A. Dykewicz, et al. recommend vigilant screening laboratory animals to be used in research facilities either through serum samples or cell line aliquots, as well as ensuring adequate ventilation in housing areas and use of appropriate sanitation products. Other practices to reduce cross-contamination in rodents include washing hands or changing gloves between animal care activities, thoroughly decontaminating cages before reusing them, and avoiding housing healthy rodents in the vicinity of potentially infected rodents.

== Other animals ==
It can be found in different species of mice.

=== Mice ===
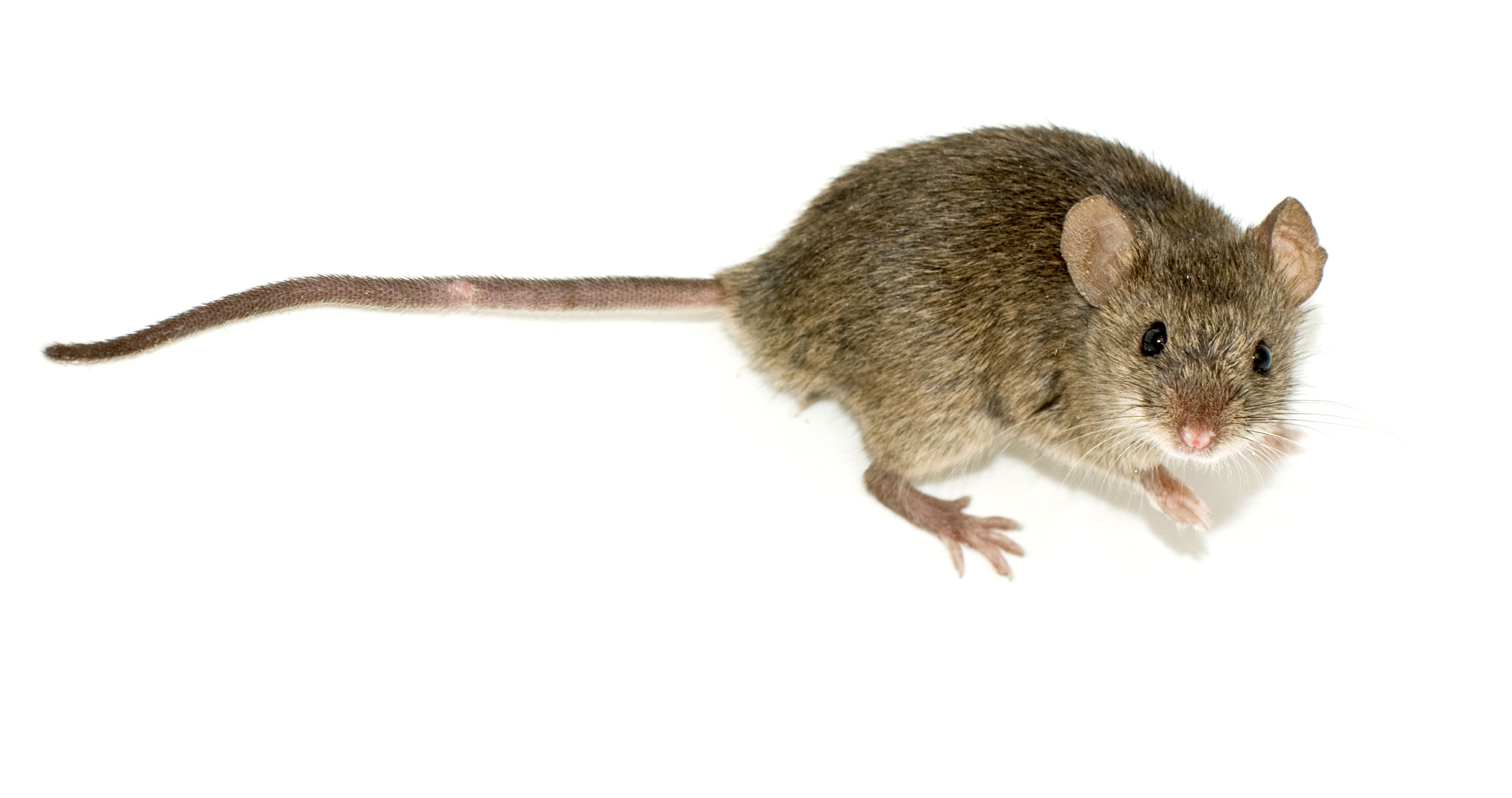
A house mouse Mus musculus

A study conducted by John Hotchin and Heribert Weigand, of the New York State Department of Health, concluded, "The age of the mouse when first exposed to the virus determines its immune response." If LCMV infection occurs in utero or within the first few hours of life, during the immunologically unresponsive period, the mouse will develop immune tolerance. The virus will continue to proliferate for an indefinite time. However, if a mouse is infected after the neonatal period, when the immune system is responsive, the immune response is active. This immunological conflict can result in one of three ways; immunological paralysis, significant or complete suppression of virus with immunity to reinfection, or death. Mice that are infected after the neonatal period often pass through a "runt" stage, which may last for several weeks. Clinical symptoms include excitability, weight loss, and severe retardation of growth and hair development. In general, as the period of time between birth and inoculation decreases, less disease and mortality occurs.

=== Hamsters ===
Pathogenesis occurs in the same manner in hamsters as in mice. Symptoms in hamsters are highly variable, and typically indicate that the pet has been infected and shedding the virus for several months. Early signs may include inactivity, loss of appetite, and a rough coat. As the disease progresses, the animal may experience weight loss, hunched posture, inflammation around the eyes, and eventually death. Alternatively, some infected hamsters may be asymptomatic.

=== Diagnosis ===
As in humans, the sensitivity of testing methods for rodents contributes to the accuracy of diagnosis. LCMV is typically identified through serology. However, in an endemically infected colony, more practical methods include MAP (mouse antibody production) and PCR testing. Another means of diagnosis is introducing a known naïve adult mouse to the suspect rodent colony. The introduced mouse will seroconvert, allowing use of immunofluorescence antibody (IFA), MFIA or ELISA to detect antibodies.

=== Treatment ===
Immunosuppressive therapy has been effective in halting the disease for laboratory animals.

=== In pets ===
Pet rodents are not known to be natural reservoirs for lymphocytic choriomeningitis virus. However, pets can become vectors if they are exposed to wild house mice in a breeding facility, pet store, or home. Such infections are rare. To date, (January 2017) documented infections in humans have occurred only after introduction to infected mice, guinea pigs, and hamsters, with the majority of cases transmitted by mice. LCMV infection in other animals, including zoo animals, may be possible.

In choosing a pet, the CDC advises looking for general indications of health both in the prospective pet and others in the facility. The rodent of choice should be lively and alert, have a glossy coat, breathe normally and have no discharge from eyes or nose. If one of the animals in the facility looks ill, the others may have been exposed, and none of the rodents at that location should be purchased.

Serologic testing is not recommended for pet rodents, as it has been unreliable in detecting antibodies in animals with active infections. For laboratory purposes, immunohistochemistry staining of tissues and virus isolation are used for more accurate testing, but this is unnecessary for the general house pet. The greatest risk of infection to humans occurs shortly after purchase of a pet, so that exposure to the virus, if present, has likely already occurred to existing pet owners. Continued ownership poses negligible additional risk.

The National Center for Infectious Disease suggests the following precautions to reduce the risk of LCMV infection:

- Wash hands with soap and water after handling pet rodents; use waterless alcohol-based hand rubs when soap is not available.
- Keep rodent cages clean and free of soiled bedding.
- Clean the cage in a well-ventilated area or outside.
- Wash hands thoroughly with soap and water after cleaning up pet droppings. Closely supervise young children, especially those less than five years old, when cleaning cages, and make sure they wash their hands immediately after handling rodents and rodent caging or bedding.
- Do not kiss pet rodents or hold them close to your face.

Rodent owners who no longer wish to keep their pet should consult a veterinarian. Pets should not be released into the wild for humane, legal, and ecological reasons. After a rodent has been purchased, it should not be returned to the pet store as it may have been exposed to LCMV through house mice.

== Research ==
LCM is the archetypal arenavirus, and was instrumental in research which uncovered the major pathogenetic mechanisms of all arenaviruses.

The field of viral immunology will continue to be uncovered by the model system of LCMV. Specifically, the study of persistent viral infections as well as vaccine development, represent two essential areas. LCMV is already identified as the best model to examine the difference between acute and persistent infection in its natural host Mus musculus, the common house mouse. Conveniently, the mouse is also the most widely used genetic model for mammalian genetics. A major phenotypic difference results from only two nucleotide differences between acute LCMV, also known as Armstrong LCMV, and one of its variant, Clone 13, which leads to persistent LCMV infection. One of the nucleotide mutations is in the process of glycoprotein formation and affects tropism. The second base pair mutation affects the polymerase which influences replicative capacity. The mechanism by which these mutations cause acute versus chronic LCMV infection is not understood.

An aspect of the present modern society is the increased understanding of the burden of cancer. In many ways, this disease mirrors persistent viral infection, in the way that it evades and progresses despite the immune system's effort to eliminate it. LCMV has been used as a model system towards understanding T cell memory and vaccine synthesis. It was the original model when first studied focused on CD8 T cells response towards LCMV infection. In addition, studies utilizing LCMV have led to increased understanding of CD4+ T cell memory, which impacts the study of vaccine formation mechanisms. Specifically, LCMV has been recently used to quantify the efficiency of a new hydrogen peroxide-based vaccine formation mechanism.

LCMV is a prototype of more severe hemorrhagic fever viruses, especially Lassa virus with the greatest prevalence in sub-Saharan Africa. However, other strains of this virus (Junin and Machupo viruses) are present in parts of South America and other strains continue to significantly affect the southern African population. Since the modern society continue to become a more inter-connected world, the spread of these virus strains will continue to pose a severe threat around the globe. Understanding the biology of the LCMV model virus will help in advancing the understanding of this important class of viruses and more specifically will give insight into the biology of the Lassa virus which proves to be a growing threat around the world. Furthermore, the United States National Institute of Allergy and Infectious Diseases (NIAID) has appointed the family of arenaviridae to be "Category A Priority Pathogens". This translates to the highest level of importance for the high potential for morbidity and mortality from an infectious agent which is relatively easy to produce and transmit.
