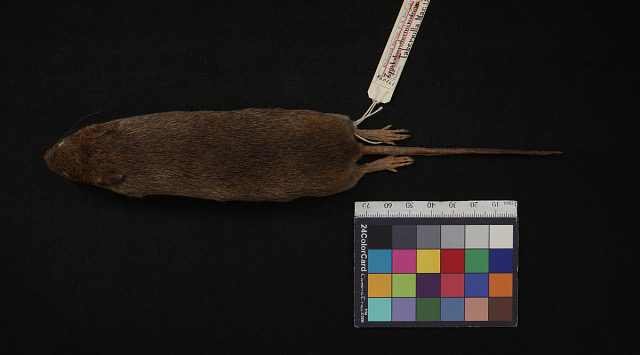

Conservation status
- Least Concern (IUCN 3.1)

Scientific classification
- Kingdom: Animalia
- Phylum: Chordata
- Class: Mammalia
- Order: Rodentia
- Family: Cricetidae
- Subfamily: Sigmodontinae
- Genus: Zygodontomys
- Species: Z. brevicauda

Binomial name
- Zygodontomys brevicauda J.A. Allen & Chapman, 1893

= Zygodontomys brevicauda =

Species of rodent

Zygodontomys brevicauda, also known as the short-tailed zygodont, short-tailed cane mouse, or common cane mouse, is a species of rodent in the genus Zygodontomys of tribe Oryzomyini.

== Distribution ==
It occurs from Costa Rica via Panama, Colombia and Venezuela into Guyana, Suriname, French Guiana and northern Brazil, including Trinidad and Tobago in the Caribbean.

== Subspecies ==
It includes three subspecies:

- Zygodontomys brevicauda brevicauda
- Zygodontomys brevicauda cherriei
- Zygodontomys brevicauda microtinus.

== Diseases ==
Many Zygodontomys brevicauda serve as viral reservoirs, causing illnesses such as Venezuelan hemorrhagic fever.

== Literature cited ==
- Duff, A. and Lawson, A. 2004. Mammals of the World: A checklist. Yale University Press, 312 pp. ISBN 978-0-300-10398-4
- Musser, G.G. and Carleton, M.D. 2005. Superfamily Muroidea. Pp. 894–1531 in Wilson, D.E. and Reeder, D.M. (eds.). Mammal Species of the World: a taxonomic and geographic reference. 3rd ed. Baltimore: The Johns Hopkins University Press, 2 vols., 2142 pp. ISBN 978-0-8018-8221-0
