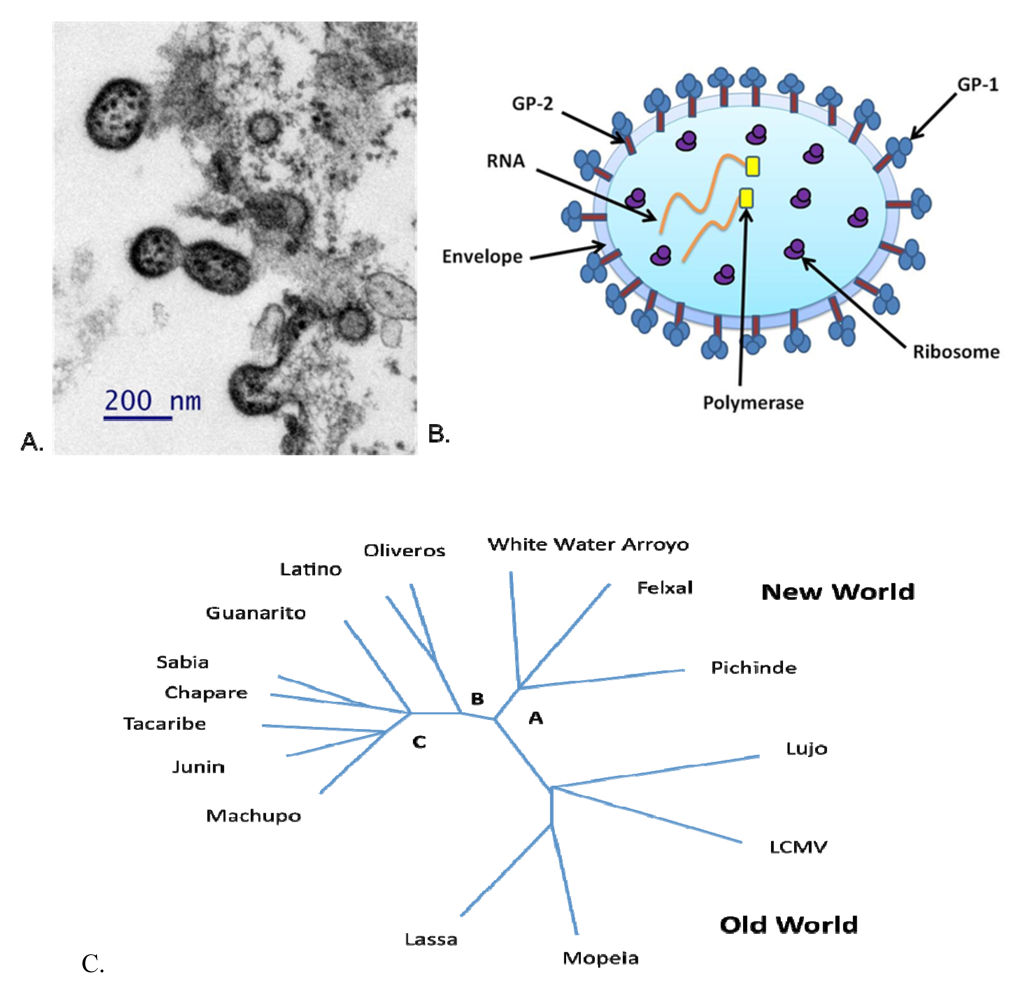
- TEM and illustration of Junín virus (JUNV) particle and phylogenetic tree

Virus classification
- (unranked): Virus
- Realm: Riboviria
- Kingdom: Orthornavirae
- Phylum: Negarnaviricota
- Class: Bunyaviricetes
- Order: Hareavirales
- Family: Arenaviridae
- Genus: Mammarenavirus
- Species: Mammarenavirus juninense

Synonyms
- Argentinian mammarenavirus; Junin virus; Junín virus

= Junín virus =

Species of virus

Junin virus or Junín virus (JUNV), is an arenavirus in the Mammarenavirus genus that causes Argentine hemorrhagic fever (AHF). The virus took its original name from the city of Junín, around which the first cases of infection were reported, in 1958.

== Virology ==
=== Structure ===
Junín virus is a negative sense ssRNA enveloped virion with a variable diameter between 50 and 300 nm. The surface of the particle encompasses a layer of T-shaped glycoproteins, each extending up to 10 nm outwards from the envelope, which are important in mediating attachment and entry into host cells.

=== Genome ===
The Junín virus genome is composed of two single-stranded RNA molecules, each encoding two different genes in an ambisense orientation. The two segments are termed 'short (S)' and 'long (L)' owing to their respective lengths. The short segment (around 3400 nucleotides in length) encodes the nucleocapsid protein and the glycoprotein precursor (GPC). The GPC is subsequently cleaved to form two viral glycoproteins, GP1 and GP2, which ultimately form the T-shaped glycoprotein spike which extends outwards from the viral envelope. . The long segment (around 7200 nucleotides in length) encodes the viral polymerase and a zinc-binding protein. The virus is spread by rodents.

== Disease and epidemiology ==
A member of the genus Mammarenavirus, Junín virus characteristically causes Argentine hemorrhagic fever (AHF). AHF leads to severe compromise of the vascular, neurological and immune systems and has a mortality rate between 20 and 30%. Symptoms of the disease are conjunctivitis, purpura, petechiae and occasionally sepsis. The symptoms of the disease can be confusing; the condition can be mistaken for a different one, especially during the first week when it can resemble a flu.

Since the discovery of Junín virus in 1958, the geographical distribution of the pathogen, although still confined to Argentina, has expanded. At the time of discovery, Junín virus was confined to an area of around 15,000 km^{2}. At the beginning of 2000, the region with reported cases grew to around 150,000 km^{2}. The natural hosts of Junín virus are rodents, particularly Mus musculus, Calomys spp. and Akodon azarae. Direct rodent-to-human transmission only takes place when a person makes direct contact with the excrement of an infected rodent; this can occur by ingestion of contaminated food or water, inhalation of particles in urine or direct contact of an open wound with rodent feces.

== Potential therapy ==
A potential novel treatment, the NMT inhibitor, has been shown to completely inhibit JUNV infection in cells based assays. EPRS1 acts, in human cells, as a proviral factor in mammarenaviruses infection, including LASV, and its inhibition using halofuginon compound, a prolyl domain inhibitor of EPRS1, completely abolishes the viral infection by interrupting viral assembly and budding. PKR has been shown to act as a proviral factor while the inhibition of its kinase activity restricted the virus replication and infectivity.

== Prevention and control ==
An investigational (in the US) vaccine (Candid1) was developed at the US Army Medical Research Institute for Infectious Disease (USAMRIID) at Ft. Detrick, MD in the 1980s which has shown to be safe, well tolerated and effective in reducing mortality and morbidity due to AHF. The vaccine, which came from an XJ strain of the Junín virus, was continually passaged a total of 44 times in newborn mouse brains, and a total of 19 times along with cloning in FRhL cells. Over 90% of the volunteers in Phase 1 and 2 clinical trials developed antibodies against the Junín virus, and 99% developed an adequate immune response specific for Junín virus. Moreover, a large efficacy study among 6,500 people, where 3,255 individuals were randomly selected to take Candid 1 and 3,245 individuals were randomly selected to take a placebo resulted in 23 cases of Junin-like infections, where 22 out of the 23 cases were from the placebo group. This efficacy study resulted in a 95% vaccine efficacy. Currently, the Candid 1 vaccine, otherwise known as the Junin vaccine, is licensed in Argentina by the regulatory agency of Argentina where Junín virus is endemic to the region. People in laboratories who come in constant contact with Junín virus are also recommended to take the Junin vaccine to prevent transmission.
