= Lassa fever =

Viral disease spread by a type of mouse

- Other names: Lassa hemorrhagic fever
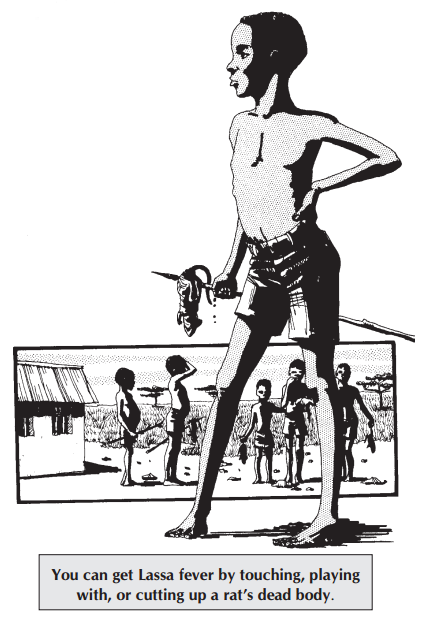
- Community education material for Lassa fever
- Specialty: Infectious disease
- Symptoms: Fever, headaches, bleeding
- Complications: Partial or complete, temporary or permanent hearing loss
- Usual onset: 1–3 weeks following exposure
- Causes: Lassa virus
- Risk factors: Exposure to rodents in West Africa
- Diagnostic method: Laboratory testing
- Differential diagnosis: Ebola, malaria, typhoid fever
- Treatment: Supportive
- Prognosis: ~1% risk of death with treatment
- Frequency: 400,000 cases per year
- Deaths: 5,000 deaths per year

Lassa fever, also known as Lassa hemorrhagic fever, is a type of viral hemorrhagic fever caused by the Lassa virus. Many of those infected by the virus do not develop symptoms. When symptoms occur, they typically include fever, weakness, headaches, vomiting, and muscle pains. Less commonly there may be bleeding from the mouth or gastrointestinal tract. The risk of death once infected is about one percent and frequently occurs within two weeks of the onset of symptoms. Of those who survive, about a quarter have hearing loss, which improves within three months in about half of these cases.

Lassa fever is usually spread to humans via contact with the urine or feces of an infected multimammate mouse. Spread can then occur via direct contact between people. Diagnosis based on symptoms is difficult. Confirmation is by laboratory testing to detect the virus's RNA, antibodies for the virus, or the virus itself in cell culture. Other conditions that may present similarly include Ebola, malaria, typhoid fever, and yellow fever. The Lassa virus is a member of the Arenaviridae family of viruses.

There is no vaccine. Prevention requires isolating those who are infected and decreasing contact with the mice. Other efforts to control the spread of disease include having a cat to hunt vermin, and storing food in sealed containers. Treatment is directed at addressing dehydration and improving symptoms. The antiviral medication ribavirin has been recommended, but evidence to support its use is weak.

Descriptions of the disease date from the 1950s. The virus was first described in 1969 from a case in the town of Lassa, in Borno State, Nigeria. Lassa fever is relatively common in West Africa including the countries of Nigeria, Liberia, Sierra Leone, Guinea, and Ghana. There are about 300,000 to 500,000 cases which result in 5,000 deaths a year.

== Signs and symptoms ==
Onset of symptoms is typically 7 to 21 days after exposure. These mild symptoms may include fever, tiredness, weakness, and headache. In 20% of people more severe symptoms such as bleeding gums, breathing problems, vomiting, chest pain, or dangerously low blood pressure may occur. Long term complications may include hearing loss. In women who are pregnant, miscarriage or stillbirth may occur with a likelihood of 95%. Lassa fever can be difficult to distinguish clinically from other viral hemorrhagic fevers, such as Ebola virus disease. A combination of pharyngitis, pain behind the sternum, presence of excess protein in the urine and fever can indicate Lassa fever with higher specificity.

In cases in which death occurs, this typically occurs within 14 days of onset. About 1% of all Lassa virus infections result in death. Approximately 15–20% of those who have required hospitalization for Lassa fever die. The risk of death is greater in those who are pregnant. A "Swollen baby syndrome" may occur in newborns, infants and toddlers with pitting edema, abdominal distension and bleeding.

== Cause ==
=== Virology ===
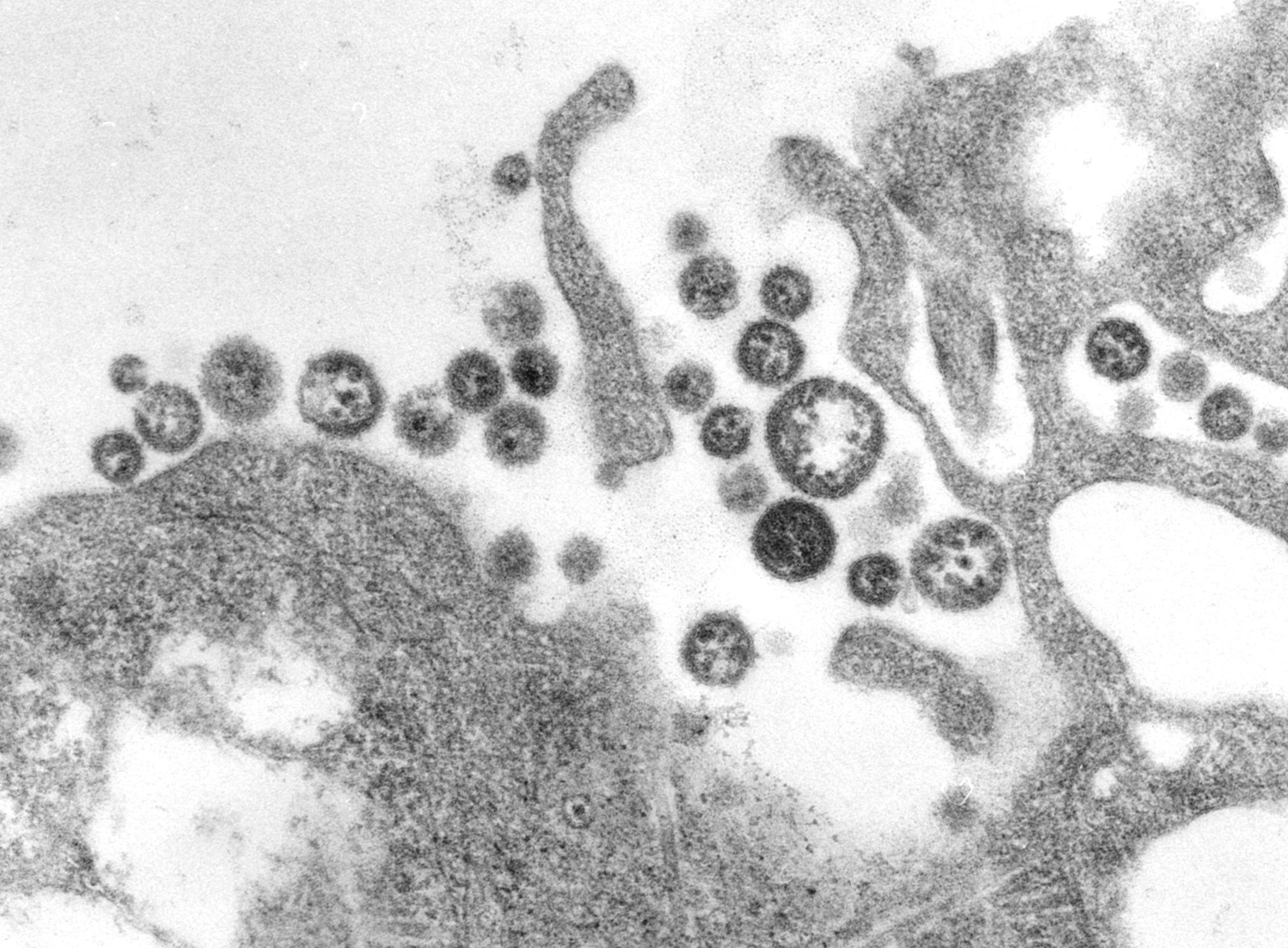
A transmission electron micrograph (TEM) of a number of Lassa virus virions adjacent to some cell debris

Lassa virus is a member of the Arenaviridae, a family of negative-sense, single-stranded RNA viruses. Specifically it is an old world arenavirus, which is enveloped, single-stranded, and bi-segmented RNA. Lassa virus contains both a large and a small genome section, with seven lineages identified to date: Lineages I, II, and III from Nigeria; Lineage IV from Sierra Leone, Guinea, and Liberia; Lineage V from Cote D’Ivoire and Mali Lineage VI from Togo; and Lineage VII from Benin.

=== Spread ===
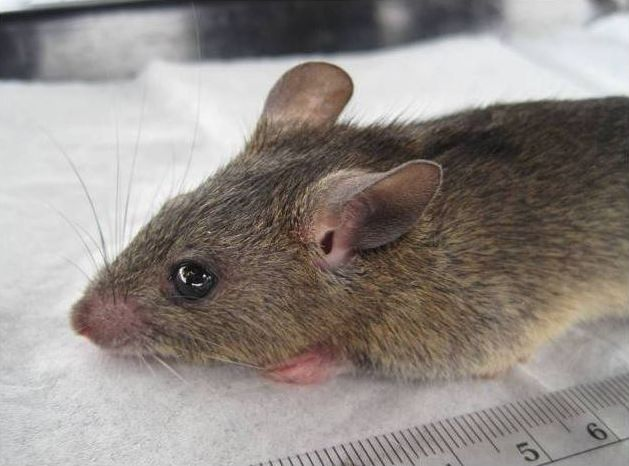
Mastomys natalensis, the natural reservoir of the Lassa fever virus

Lassa virus commonly spreads to humans from other animals, specifically the Natal multimammate mouse or African rat, also called the Natal multimammate rat (Mastomys natalensis). This is probably the most common mouse in equatorial Africa, common in human households and eaten as a delicacy in some areas.

The multimammate mouse can quickly produce a large number of offspring, tends to colonize human settlements, and is found throughout the west, central and eastern parts of the African continent.

Once the mouse has become a carrier, it will excrete the virus throughout the rest of its lifetime through feces and urine creating ample opportunity for exposure. The virus is probably transmitted by contact with the feces or urine of animals accessing grain stores in residences. No study has proven presence in breast milk, but the high level of viremia suggests it may be possible.

Individuals who are at a higher risk of contracting the infection are those who live in rural areas where Mastomys are discovered, and where sanitation is not prevalent. Infection typically occurs by direct or indirect exposure to animal excrement through the respiratory or gastrointestinal tracts. Inhalation of tiny particles of infectious material (aerosol) is believed to be the most significant means of exposure. It is possible to acquire the infection through broken skin or mucous membranes that are directly exposed to infectious material. Transmission from person to person has been established, presenting a disease risk for healthcare workers. The virus is present in urine for between three and nine weeks after infection, and it can be transmitted in semen for up to three months after infection.

== Diagnosis ==
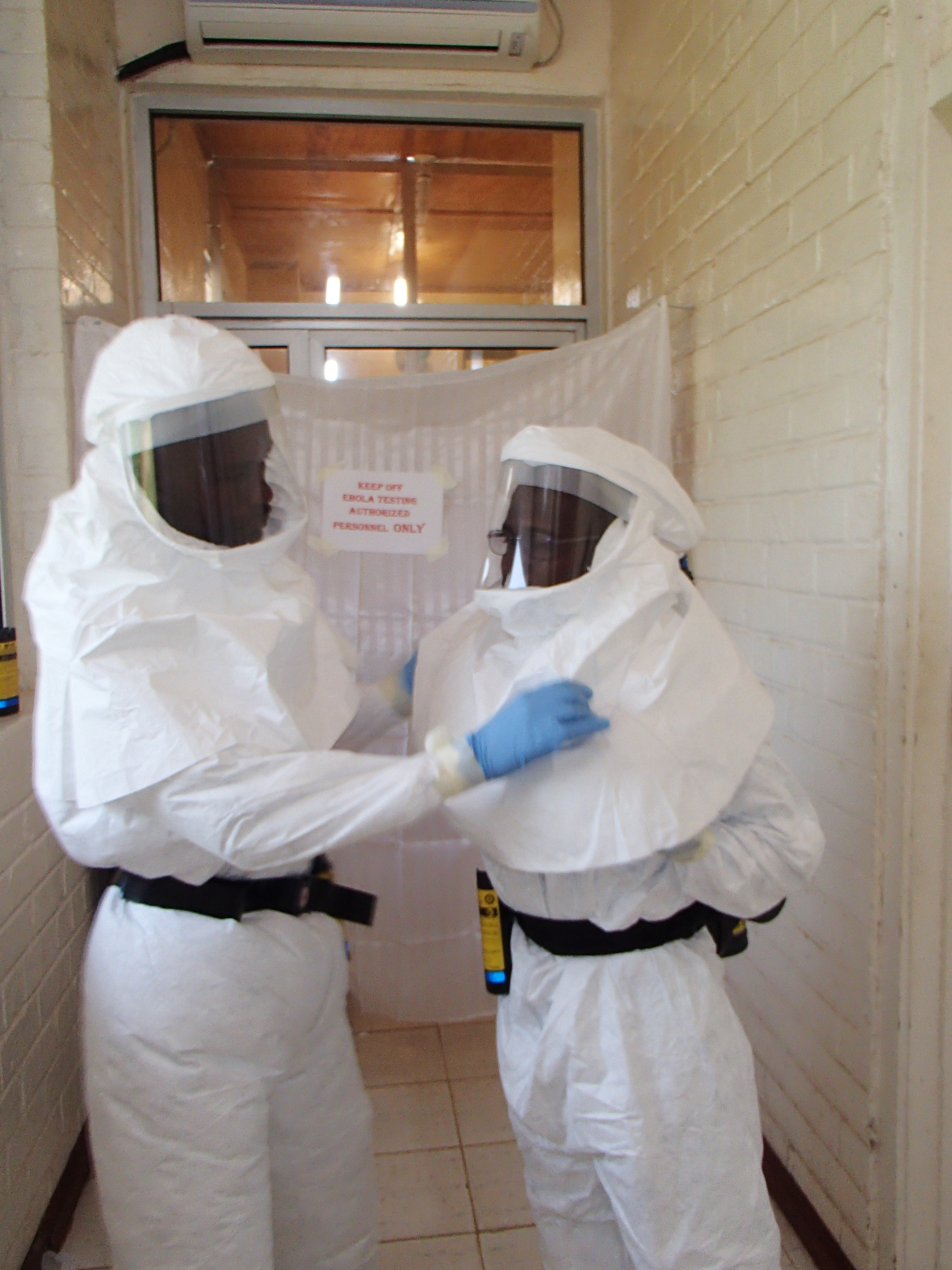
Liberian laboratory technicians in personal protective equipment preparing to test Lassa fever samples

A range of laboratory investigations are performed, where possible, to diagnose the disease and assess its course and complications. The confidence of a diagnosis can be compromised if laboratory tests are not available. One comprising factor is the number of febrile illnesses present in Africa, such as malaria or typhoid fever that could potentially exhibit similar symptoms, particularly for non-specific manifestations of Lassa fever. In cases with abdominal pain, in countries where Lassa is common, Lassa fever is often misdiagnosed as appendicitis and intussusception which delays treatment with the antiviral ribavirin. In West Africa, where Lassa is most common, it is difficult to diagnose due to the absence of proper equipment to perform testing.

The United States FDA has yet to approve a widely validated laboratory test for Lassa, but there are tests that have been able to provide definitive proof of the presence of the LASV virus. These tests include cell cultures, PCR, ELISA antigen assays, plaque neutralization assays, and immunofluorescence essays. However, immunofluorescence essays provide less definitive proof of Lassa infection. An ELISA test for antigen and Immunoglobulin M antibodies give 88% sensitivity and 90% specificity for the presence of the infection. Other laboratory findings in Lassa fever include lymphocytopenia (low lymphocyte white blood cell count), thrombocytopenia (low platelets), and elevated aspartate transaminase levels in the blood. Lassa fever virus can also be found in cerebrospinal fluid.

== Prevention ==
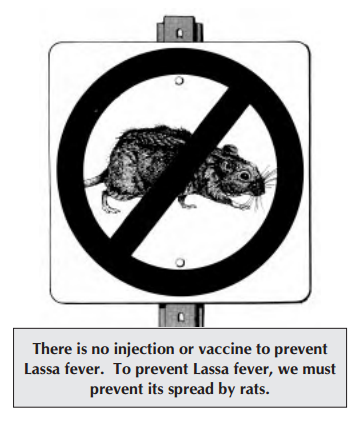
Community education material for Lassa fever

Control of the Mastomys rodent population is impractical, so measures focus on keeping rodents out of homes and food supplies, encouraging effective personal hygiene, proper grain storage and other foodstuffs in rodent-proof containers, and disposing of garbage far from the home to help sustain clean households. Gloves, masks, laboratory coats, and goggles are advised while in contact with an infected person, to avoid contact with blood and body fluids. These issues in many countries are monitored by a department of public health. In less developed countries, these types of organizations may not have the necessary means to effectively control outbreaks.

=== Vaccine ===
There is no vaccine for humans as of 2024. Researchers at the United States Army Medical Research Institute of Infectious Diseases facility had a promising vaccine candidate in 2002. They have developed a replication-competent vaccine against Lassa virus based on recombinant vesicular stomatitis virus vectors expressing the Lassa virus glycoprotein. After a single intramuscular injection, test primates have survived lethal challenge, while showing no clinical symptoms.

== Treatment ==
Treatment is directed at addressing dehydration and improving symptoms.

=== Medications ===
The antiviral medication ribavirin has been recommended, but evidence to support its use is weak. Some evidence has found that it may worsen outcomes in certain cases. Fluid replacement, blood transfusions, and medication for low blood pressure may be required. Intravenous interferon therapy has also been used.

=== Indirect antivirals ===
A potential novel treatment, the NMT inhibitor, has been shown to completely inhibit Lassa infection in cells based assays by targeting Z protein and SSP for degradation. Favipiravir, a nucleoside analogue, has been shown to be effective at treating Lassa fever in immunocompetent mouse, guinea pigs and macaques. A case report showed that a combination of favipiravir with ribavirin is effective for Lassa fever, with two patients surviving. In vivo, the EC_{50} of favipiravir is 2.89 μg.mL^{−1}and doses larger than 1200 mg twice a day should have the capability to strongly reduce the production infectious virus.

=== Pregnancy ===
When Lassa fever infects pregnant women late in their third trimester, inducing delivery is necessary for the mother to have a good chance of survival. This is because the virus has an affinity for the placenta and other highly vascular tissues. The fetus has only a one in ten chance of survival no matter what course of action is taken; hence, the focus is always on saving the life of the mother.

== Prognosis ==
About 15–20% of hospitalized people with Lassa fever will die from the illness. The overall case fatality rate is estimated to be 1%, but during epidemics, mortality can climb as high as 50%. The mortality rate is greater than 80% when it occurs in pregnant women during their third trimester; fetal death also occurs in nearly all those cases. Abortion decreases the risk of death to the mother. Some survivors experience lasting effects of the disease, and can include partial or complete deafness.

Because of treatment with ribavirin, fatality rates have declined.

== Epidemiology ==
Lassa fever distribution. Countries reporting continued spread of disease and outbreaks in blue. Countries reporting a few cases, periodic isolation of virus, or serological evidence of infection in green. Countries with unknown status in grey.

There are about 300,000 to 500,000 cases which result in 5,000 deaths a year. One estimate places the number as high as 3 million cases per year.

Estimates of Lassa fever are complicated by the lack of easily available diagnosis, limited public health surveillance infrastructure, and high clustering of incidence near high intensity sampling.

The infection affects females 1.2 times more than males. The age group predominantly infected is 21–30 years.

=== Geography ===
Lassa high risk areas are near the western and eastern extremes of West Africa. As of 2018, the Lassa belt includes Guinea, Nigeria, Sierra Leone and Liberia. As of 2003, 10–16% of people in Sierra Leone and Liberia admitted to hospital had the virus. The case fatality rate for those who are hospitalized for the disease is about 15–20%. Research showed a twofold increase risk of infection for those living in close proximity to someone with infection symptoms within the last year.

The high risk areas cannot be well defined by any known biogeographical or environmental breaks except for the multimammate rat, particularly Guinea (Kindia, Faranah and Nzérékoré regions), Liberia (mostly in Lofa, Bong, and Nimba counties), Nigeria (in about 10 of 36 states) and Sierra Leone (typically from Kenema and Kailahun districts). It is less common in the Central African Republic, Mali, Senegal and other nearby countries, and less common yet in Ghana and the Democratic Republic of the Congo. Benin had its first confirmed cases in 2014, and Togo had its first confirmed cases in 2016.

As of 2013, the spread of Lassa outside of West Africa had been very limited. Twenty to thirty cases had been described in Europe, as being caused by importation through infected individuals. These cases found outside of West Africa were found to have a high fatality risk because of the delay of diagnosis and treatment due to being unaware of the risk associated with the symptoms. Imported cases have not manifested in larger epidemics outside of Africa due to a lack of human to human transmission in hospital settings. An exception had occurred in 2003 when a healthcare worker became infected before the person showed clear symptoms.

In October 2024, a resident of Iowa, United States died due to Lassa fever following a trip to West Africa, as reported by the Iowa Department of Health and Human Services. Health officials indicate the person likely contracted Lassa fever—transmissible through contact with infected body fluids or, potentially, with rodents while abroad, according to guidance from the Centers for Disease Control and Prevention.

=== Nigeria ===
==== 2018 outbreak ====
Infections and deaths by country
Country	Infections	Deaths
Nigeria	2,121	132
Liberia	108	
Sierra Leone	129	12
Guinea	98	

An outbreak of Lassa fever occurred in Nigeria during 2018 and spread to 18 of the country's states; it was the largest outbreak of Lassa recorded. The outbreak primarily affected Nigeria, Liberia, Sierra Leone, and Guinea, with cases reported since January 2018.

As of 25 February 2018, there were 1081 suspected cases and 90 reported deaths; 317 of the cases and 72 deaths were confirmed as Lassa which increased to a total of 431 reported cases in 2018. During the outbreak, a total of 3,498 infections were recorded, resulting in 171 deaths. Nigeria was the most severely impacted, accounting for over half of the total cases and fatalities. The World Health Organization (WHO) reported on 27 March 2018 that 1,081 suspected cases and 90 deaths had occurred. It was one of the most severe Lassa fever outbreaks in the region in recent years, exhausting a significant portion of the global emergency medical response resources.

Health organizations, including Doctors Without Borders and the WHO, collaborated with national governments to contain the outbreak through mass awareness campaigns, improved surveillance, and emergency medical interventions. In total, 2.1 million people received preventive health education, while emergency treatment centers were established across affected regions.

Nigeria was the hardest hit country, with 2,121 cases and 132 deaths reported. The outbreak affected 18 of its 36 states, with the highest cases recorded in Edo, Ondo, and Ebonyi States. The Nigerian Ministry of Health launched an extensive awareness campaign and deployed medical teams to affected areas. Emergency supplies, including ribavirin (an antiviral drug), were distributed, and treatment centers were set up in federal hospitals to manage severe cases.

==== 2019 outbreak ====
Lassa fever
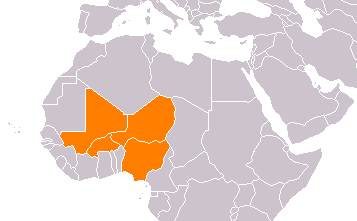
- Countries affected by the epidemic
- Location: Sierra Leone, Liberia, Guinea, and Nigeria
- Casualties: 25,000 suspected cases
- Deaths: 1,100 dead

The total cases in Nigeria in 2019 was 810 with 167 deaths, the largest case fatality rate (23.3%) until then.

==== 2020 outbreak ====
The epidemic started from the second week of the January. By the tenth week the total number of cases has risen to 855 and deaths to 144, the case fatality rate of 16.8%.

==== 2021 outbreak ====
On 8 December 2021, the Nigeria Centre for Disease Control (NCDC) was notified of the death of two persons from Lassa fever.

==== 2022 outbreak ====
The epidemic took a new form, from 3 to 30 January 2022, 211 laboratory confirmed Lassa fever cases including 40 deaths (case fatality ratio: 19%) have been cumulatively reported in 14 of the 36 Nigerian states and the Federal Capital Territory across the country. In total from January until March, 132 deaths have been reported with a case fatality rate (CFR) of 19.1% which is lower than the CFR for the same period in 2021 (21.0%).

==== 2024 outbreak ====
In October 2024, a resident of Iowa, United States, died from Lassa fever after traveling to West Africa, demonstrating the risk of international spread.

==== 2025 outbreak ====
Nigeria is grappling with a severe Lassa fever outbreak, reporting 535 confirmed cases and 98 deaths across 14 states since January, with a case fatality rate of 18.3%. The disease spread to a patient who travelled to the UK, prompting contact tracing efforts in both countries. The Nigeria Centre for Disease Control and Prevention (NCDC) issued a renewed advisory urging heightened awareness and preventative measures.

2026 outbreak

According to NCDC, 9 states have recorded at least one case of Lassa fever in the present year, with a mortality rate of at least 18.1%.

=== Liberia ===
Lassa fever is endemic in Liberia. From 1 January 2017 through 23 January 2018, 91 suspected cases were reported from six counties: Bong, Grand Bassa, Grand Kru, Lofa, Margibi, and Nimba. Thirty-three of these cases were laboratory confirmed, including 15 deaths (case fatality rate for confirmed cases = 45.4%).

Liberia recorded 108 infections and 9 fatalities associated with 2018 Nigeria outbreak. The outbreak was concentrated in Lofa and Nimba Counties, where healthcare infrastructure was already fragile due to past epidemics. The Liberian Ministry of Health, supported by international partners, deployed mobile clinics and trained health workers to improve case detection and management.

In February 2020, a total of 24 confirmed cases with nine associated deaths has been reported from nine health districts in six counties. Grand Bossa and Bong counties account for 20 of the confirmed cases.

=== Other countries ===
Sierra Leone reported 129 infections, with 12 deaths, in 2018. The outbreak was especially severe in Kenema and Bo Districts, where local health authorities struggled with limited resources. Public health officials launched community awareness initiatives to educate citizens about hygiene practices to prevent further spread.

Guinea experienced 98 cases and 8 fatalities, making it one of the least affected countries in the region in 2018. The outbreak was largely contained due to early intervention measures, including stringent border screenings and rapid response teams.

== History ==
The disease was identified in Nigeria in 1969. It is named after the town of Lassa, where it was discovered.

Soon after Lassa fever was documented, a nurse, a doctor, and a lab technician died after contracting it. A prominent expert in the disease, Aniru Conteh, also died from the disease.

== Research ==
The Lassa virus is one of several viruses identified by WHO as a likely cause of a future epidemic. They therefore list it for urgent research and development to develop new diagnostic tests, vaccines, and medicines.

In 2007, SIGA Technologies, studied a medication in guinea pig with Lassa fever. Work on a vaccine is continuing, with multiple approaches showing positive results in animal trials. One challenge is the lack of an ideal animal model for research on Lassa fever.
