= Zelenirstat =

Inhibitor of the NMT enzymes

Clinical data
- Other names: PCLX-001

Identifiers
- IUPAC name: 2,6-Dichloro-N-[1,5-dimethyl-3-(2-methylpropyl)pyrazol-4-yl]-4-(2-piperazin-1-ylpyridin-4-yl)benzenesulfonamide
- CAS Number: 1215011-08-7
- PubChem CID: 58561243
- DrugBank: DB15567
- ChemSpider: 35034199
- UNII: 5HY8BYC3Q6
- ChEMBL: ChEMBL3357685

Chemical and physical data
- Formula: C_{24}H_{30}Cl_{2}N_{6}O_{2}S
- Molar mass: 537.50 g·mol^{−1}
- 3D model (JSmol): Interactive image
- SMILES: CC1=C(C(=NN1C)CC(C)C)NS(=O)(=O)C2=C(C=C(C=C2Cl)C3=CC(=NC=C3)N4CCNCC4)Cl
- InChI: InChI=1S/C24H30Cl2N6O2S/c1-15(2)11-21-23(16(3)31(4)29-21)30-35(33,34)24-19(25)12-18(13-20(24)26)17-5-6-28-22(14-17)32-9-7-27-8-10-32/h5-6,12-15,27,30H,7-11H2,1-4H3; Key:WKTSLVQYGBHNRV-UHFFFAOYSA-N

Zelenirstat, also known as PCLX-001, is an investigational new drug that is being evaluated for the treatment of cancer and as an antiviral agent. It is a small molecule inhibitor targets both N-myristoyltransferase 1 (NMT1) and N-myristoyltransferase 2 (NMT2) proteins, which are responsible for myristoylation. Its dual mechanism of action disrupts both cell signaling and energy production in cancer cells.

Zelenirstat is a strong pan-N myristoyl transferase inhibitor, which prevents addition of myristic acid into penultimate glycine of protein with myristoylation signal, and initially has been introduced as anti-tumor drug. It has completed phase I clinical trial and is going through escalation phase. Its prototype DDD85646 as well as other NMT inhibitors such as IMP-1088 have strong antiviral activities against viruses that required myristoylated proteins to complete their life cycle, including hemorrhagic viruses, such as lassa and argentinian virus, and pox viruses, such as vaccinia and monkeypox.

== Mechanism of action ==
Zelenirstat acts by inhibiting NMT I and II enzymes, which are required to complete the myristoylation of proteins. Without myristoylation, these proteins are targeted for proteasomal degradation.
