= N-myristoyltransferase inhibitors =

Investigational drug

N-myristoyltransferase inhibitors are small molecules that target and inhibit N-myristoyltransferases, which block the addition of myristic acid to the penultimate glycine of proteins with myristoylation signal. The prototype is the DDD85646, and the analogues IMP-1088 and zelenirstat (PCLX-001). N-myristoyltransferase inhibitors have been shown to have potent antiviral and anti-neoplastic activities.
