= Glycylpeptide N-tetradecanoyltransferase =

glycylpeptide N-tetradecanoyltransferase
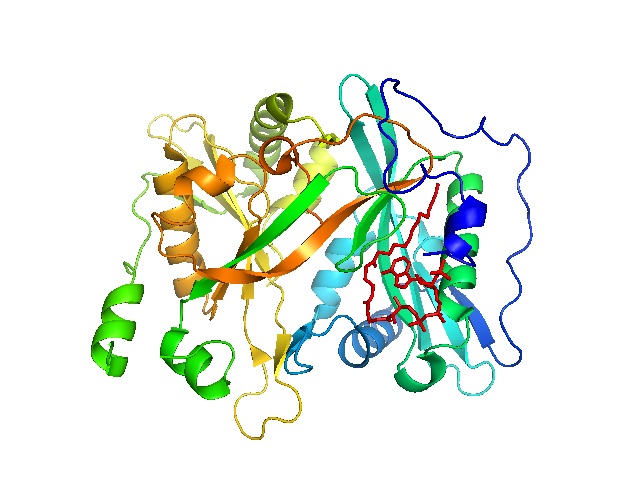
- Crystal structure of human type-I N-myristoyltransferase with bound myristoyl-CoA. Myristoyl-CoA (red). PDB ID: 3IU1

Identifiers
- EC no.: 2.3.1.97
- CAS no.: 110071-61-9

Databases
- IntEnz: IntEnz view
- BRENDA: BRENDA entry
- ExPASy: NiceZyme view
- KEGG: KEGG entry
- MetaCyc: metabolic pathway
- PRIAM: profile
- PDB structures: RCSB PDB PDBe PDBsum
- Gene Ontology: AmiGO / QuickGO
Search
- PMC: articles
- PubMed: articles
- NCBI: proteins

NMT, N-terminal

Identifiers
- Symbol: NMT
- Pfam: PF01233
- InterPro: IPR022676
- CATH: 3IU1
- SCOP2: 3IU1 / SCOPe / SUPFAM
Available protein structures:
- Pfam: structures / ECOD
- PDB: RCSB PDB; PDBe; PDBj
- PDBsum: structure summary

NMT, C-terminal

Identifiers
- Symbol: NMT_C
- Pfam: PF02799
- InterPro: IPR022677
Available protein structures:
- Pfam: structures / ECOD
- PDB: RCSB PDB; PDBe; PDBj
- PDBsum: structure summary

In enzymology, a glycylpeptide N-tetradecanoyltransferase (EC 2.3.1.97) is an enzyme that catalyzes the chemical reaction

tetradecanoyl-CoA + glycylpeptide $\rightleftharpoons$ CoA + N-tetradecanoylglycylpeptide

Thus, the two substrates of this enzyme are tetradecanoyl-CoA and glycylpeptide, whereas its two products are CoA and N-tetradecanoylglycylpeptide. It participates in the N-Myristoylation of proteins, and in vertebrates there are two isoenzymes NMT1 and NMT2.

Besides tetradecanoyl-CoA, this enzyme is also capable of using modified versions of this substrate. In human retina, an even wider range of fatty acids, including 14:1 n–9, 14:2n–6, and 12:0, are accepted by the enzyme and grafted onto guanylate cyclase activators. This is mainly a result of a special set of fatty-acid-CoA substrates available in the retina.

== Nomenclature ==
This enzyme belongs to the family of transferases, specifically those N-acyltransferases transferring groups other than aminoacyl groups (cd04301). The systematic name of this enzyme class is tetradecanoyl-CoA:glycylpeptide N-tetradecanoyltransferase. Other names in common use include peptide N-myristoyltransferase (NMT), myristoyl-CoA-protein N-myristoyltransferase, myristoyl-coenzyme A:protein N-myristoyl transferase, myristoylating enzymes, and protein N-myristoyltransferase.

== Structural studies ==
As of late 2007, 9 structures have been solved for this class of enzymes, with PDB accession codes 1IIC, 1IID, 1IYK, 1IYL, 1RXT, 2NMT, 2P6E, 2P6F, and 2P6G.

The enzyme folds into two domains, each with a double EF-hand arrangement.
