= IMP-1088 =

Identifiers
- IUPAC name: 1-(5-{3,4-Difluoro-2-[2-(1,3,5-trimethyl-1''H''-pyrazol-4-yl)ethoxy]phenyl}-1-methyl-1''H''-indazol-3-yl)-''N'',''N''-dimethylmethanamine
- CAS Number: 2059148-82-0
- PubChem CID: 132274735
- ChemSpider: 65326081
- UNII: ZT62NQ6YEV
- ChEMBL: ChEMBL4445137
- PDB ligand: KFK (PDBe, RCSB PDB)
- CompTox Dashboard (EPA): DTXSID301336328

Chemical and physical data
- Formula: C_{25}H_{29}F_{2}N_{5}O
- Molar mass: 453.538 g·mol^{−1}
- 3D model (JSmol): Interactive image
- SMILES: CC1=C(C(=NN1C)C)CCOC2=C(C=CC(=C2F)F)C3=CC4=C(C=C3)N(N=C4CN(C)C)C
- InChI: InChI=InChI=1S/C25H29F2N5O/c1-15-18(16(2)31(5)28-15)11-12-33-25-19(8-9-21(26)24(25)27)17-7-10-23-20(13-17)22(14-30(3)4)29-32(23)6/h7-10,13H,11-12,14H2,1-6H3; Key:SOXNKJCQBRQUMS-UHFFFAOYSA-N

IMP-1088 is an enzyme inhibitor of the human N-myristoyltransferases NMT1 and NMT2. It prevents the production of infectious virus particles by targeting host cell machinery rather than the virus itself. Specifically, it inhibits the host's NMT enzymes, blocking the myristoylation of viral proteins required for capsid assembly. Since this strategy acts on host proteins, it is thought to carry a lower risk of viral resistance.

== Antiviral activity ==
IMP-1088 blocks the replication of viruses that rely on myristoylated proteins for their life cycle, including poxviruses, mammarenaviruses, and rhinoviruses. This approach has been explored for potential treatment of monkeypox, Lassa fever, and the common cold.

=== Mammarenaviruses ===
The inhibitor has demonstrated activity against mammarenaviruses such as LCMV and hemorrhagic fever viruses including Lassa and Junin. In these viruses, IMP-1088 targets myristoylated proteins such as the Z matrix protein and the signal peptide of glycoprotein 1, both essential for viral assembly, budding, and propagation.

=== Poxviruses ===
In poxviruses such as vaccinia and monkeypox, inhibition of myristoylation disrupts the function of four essential myristoylated viral proteins. In combination therapies, this has been shown to completely inhibit viral replication. IMP-1088 has the benefit of overcoming immunosuppression state induced by JAK inhibitors such as Ruxolitinib.

== Research applications ==
In addition to its antiviral potential, IMP-1088 has been used as a research tool to study viral protein function. It has been shown that myristoylation and oligomerization are not required for the Z matrix protein’s dose-dependent inhibitory effect on viral ribonucleoprotein (vRNP) activity.
