= Acetyl-CoA C-myristoyltransferase =

Class of enzymes

acetyl-CoA C-myristoyltransferase

Identifiers
- EC no.: 2.3.1.155

Databases
- IntEnz: IntEnz view
- BRENDA: BRENDA entry
- ExPASy: NiceZyme view
- KEGG: KEGG entry
- MetaCyc: metabolic pathway
- PRIAM: profile
- PDB structures: RCSB PDB PDBe PDBsum
- Gene Ontology: AmiGO / QuickGO
Search
- PMC: articles
- PubMed: articles
- NCBI: proteins

Myristoyl-CoA:protein N-myristoyltransferase, C-terminal domain

Identifiers
- Symbol: NMT_C
- Pfam: PF02799
- InterPro: IPR022677
Available protein structures:
- Pfam: structures / ECOD
- PDB: RCSB PDB; PDBe; PDBj
- PDBsum: structure summary

In enzymology, an acetyl-CoA C-myristoyltransferase (EC 2.3.1.155) is an enzyme that catalyzes the chemical reaction

myristoyl-CoA + acetyl-CoA $\rightleftharpoons$ 3-oxopalmitoyl-CoA + CoA

Thus, the two substrates of this enzyme are myristoyl-CoA and acetyl-CoA, whereas its two products are 3-oxopalmitoyl-CoA and CoA.

This enzyme belongs to the family of transferases, specifically those acyltransferases transferring groups other than aminoacyl groups. The systematic name of this enzyme class is myristoyl-CoA:acetyl-CoA C-myristoyltransferase.
