= Myristoyl-CoA 11-(Z) desaturase =

myristoyl-CoA 11-(Z) desaturase

Identifiers
- EC no.: 1.14.99.32

Databases
- IntEnz: IntEnz view
- BRENDA: BRENDA entry
- ExPASy: NiceZyme view
- KEGG: KEGG entry
- MetaCyc: metabolic pathway
- PRIAM: profile
- PDB structures: RCSB PDB PDBe PDBsum
- Gene Ontology: AmiGO / QuickGO
Search
- PMC: articles
- PubMed: articles
- NCBI: proteins

In enzymology, a myristoyl-CoA 11-(Z) desaturase (EC 1.14.99.32) is an enzyme that catalyzes the chemical reaction

myristoyl-CoA + NAD(P)H + H^{+} + O_{2} $\rightleftharpoons$ (Z)-11-tetradecenoyl-CoA + NAD(P)+ + 2 H_{2}O

The 5 substrates of this enzyme are myristoyl-CoA, NADH, NADPH, H^{+}, and O_{2}, whereas its 4 products are (Z)-11-tetradecenoyl-CoA, NAD^{+}, NADP^{+}, and H_{2}O.

This enzyme belongs to the family of oxidoreductases, specifically those acting on paired donors, with O2 as oxidant and incorporation or reduction of oxygen. The oxygen incorporated need not be derive from O miscellaneous. The systematic name of this enzyme class is n-tetradecanoyl-CoA,NAD(P)H:O2 oxidoreductase [11-(Z) desaturating]. This enzyme is also called n-tetradecanoyl-CoA,NADPH:O2 oxidoreductase [11-(Z) desaturating].
