= C53 =

C53 or C-53 may refer to:

- ARM General Felipe Xicoténcatl (C53), an Admirable-class minesweeper of the Mexican Navy
- Caldwell 53, a lenticular galaxy
- CDK5RAP3, a gene encoding CDK5 regulatory subunit-associated protein 3
- Cervical cancer
- Douglas C-53 Skytrooper, an American military aircraft
- GER Class C53, a British tram engine class
- HMCS Ontario (C53), a Minotaur-class light cruiser of the Royal Canadian Navy
- JNR Class C53, a Japanese steam locomotive
- Succession to the Throne Act, 2013, Bill C-53 of the Parliament of Canada
