= CDK5R1 =

Protein-coding gene in humans

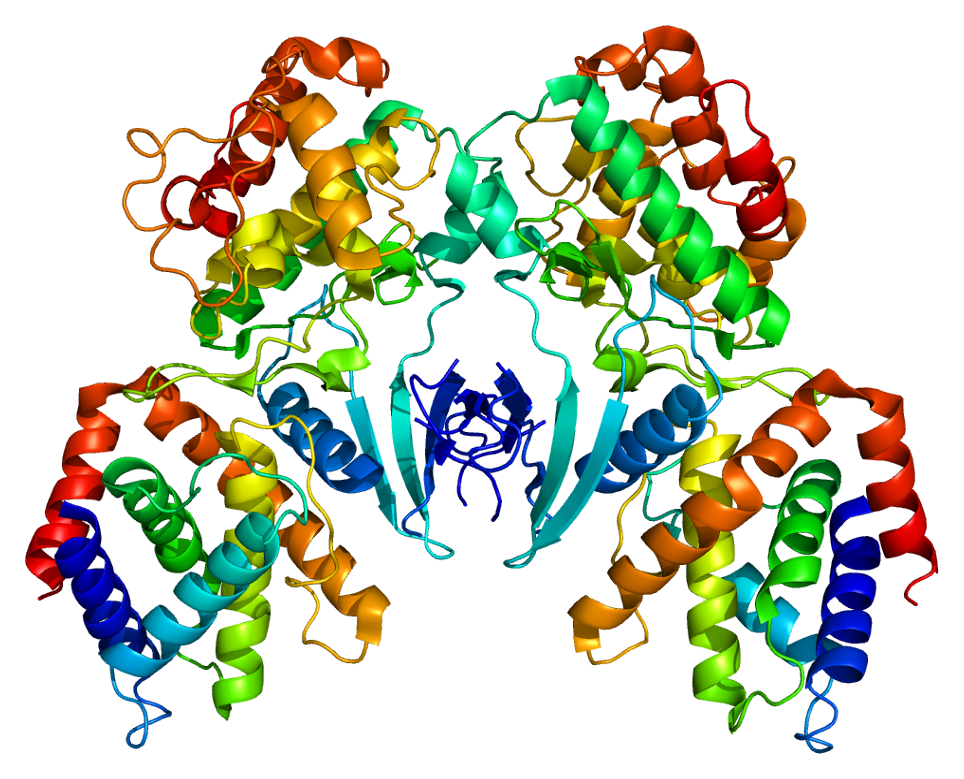
Available structures
PDB	Ortholog search: PDBe RCSB
PDB	List of PDB id codes 1H4L, 1UNG, 1UNH, 1UNL, 3O0G

Identifiers
- Aliases: CDK5R1, CDK5P35, CDK5R, NCK5A, p23, p25, p35, p35nck5a, cyclin-dependent kinase 5, regulatory subunit 1 (p35), cyclin dependent kinase 5 regulatory subunit 1
- External IDs: OMIM: 603460; MGI: 101764; HomoloGene: 31200; GeneCards: CDK5R1; OMA:CDK5R1 - orthologs

Gene location (Human)
Chr.	Chromosome 17 (human)
Band	17q11.2	Start	32,486,993 bp
Band	17q11.2	End	32,491,253 bp

Gene location (Mouse)
Chr.	Chromosome 11 (mouse)
Band	11 B5|11 47.94 cM	Start	80,367,849 bp
Band	11 B5|11 47.94 cM	End	80,372,010 bp
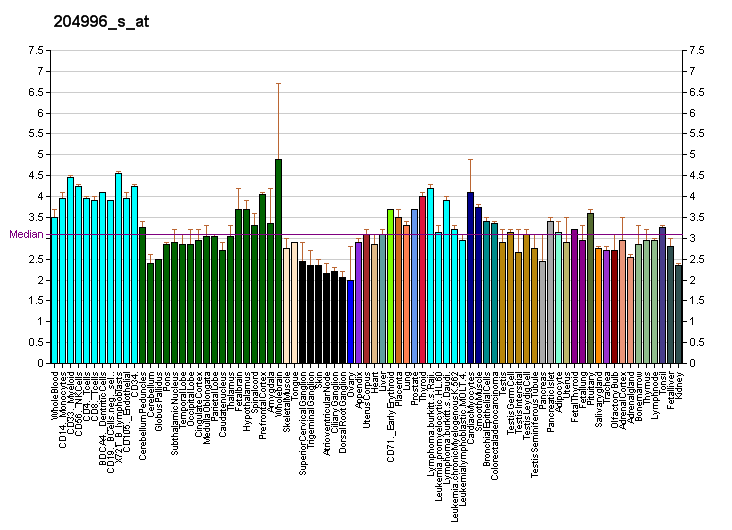

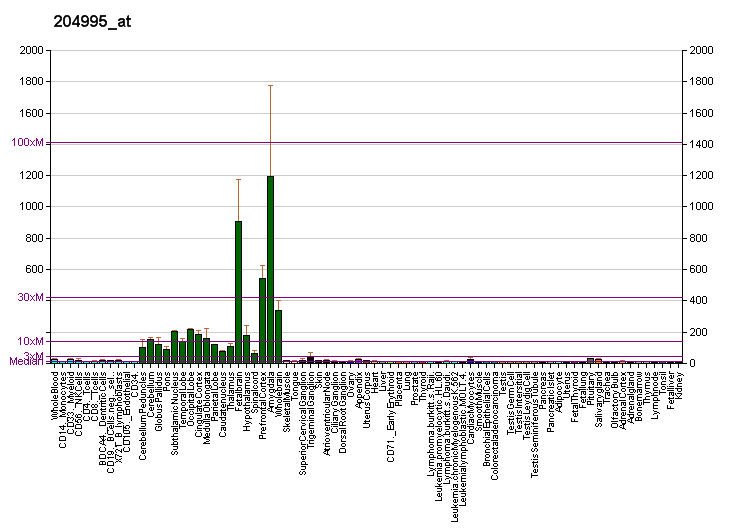
RNA expression pattern
Bgee	Human / Mouse (ortholog); Top expressed in: ganglionic eminence; Region I of hippocampus proper; Brodmann area 23; ventricular zone; superior frontal gyrus; orbitofrontal cortex; Brodmann area 9; parietal lobe; postcentral gyrus; entorhinal cortex / Top expressed in: Rostral migratory stream; medial dorsal nucleus; medial ganglionic eminence; olfactory tubercle; nucleus accumbens; medial geniculate nucleus; prefrontal cortex; lateral geniculate nucleus; lateral septal nucleus; subiculum; More reference expression data
BioGPS	More reference expression data
Gene ontology
Molecular function	protein kinase activity; calcium ion binding; ephrin receptor binding; cadherin binding; cyclin-dependent protein serine/threonine kinase activator activity; kinase activity; protein binding; protein kinase binding; protein serine/threonine kinase activator activity; protease binding; actin binding; ionotropic glutamate receptor binding; alpha-tubulin binding; beta-tubulin binding; actin filament binding; protein kinase activator activity
Cellular component	cytoplasm; cytosol; membrane; postsynaptic density; intracellular membrane-bounded organelle; growth cone; neuromuscular junction; dendritic spine; axon; soma; dendrite; protein kinase 5 complex; perinuclear region of cytoplasm; contractile fiber; nucleus; nucleoplasm; plasma membrane; microtubule; neuron projection; presynapse
Biological process	positive regulation of protein kinase activity; regulation of neuron differentiation; G protein-coupled acetylcholine receptor signaling pathway; regulation of cyclin-dependent protein serine/threonine kinase activity; regulation of actin cytoskeleton organization; embryo development; rhythmic process; ephrin receptor signaling pathway; neuron cell-cell adhesion; regulation of microtubule cytoskeleton organization; neuron migration; cerebellum development; positive regulation of protein serine/threonine kinase activity; positive regulation of neuron apoptotic process; brain development; ionotropic glutamate receptor signaling pathway; layer formation in cerebral cortex; peptidyl-serine phosphorylation; neuron differentiation; cell population proliferation; peptidyl-threonine phosphorylation; negative regulation of transcription, DNA-templated; neuron projection development; cerebral cortex radially oriented cell migration; axonal fasciculation; hippocampus development; negative regulation of axon extension; regulation of dendritic spine morphogenesis; regulation of macroautophagy; superior olivary nucleus maturation; positive regulation of protein targeting to membrane; axon guidance; regulation of signal transduction by p53 class mediator; serine phosphorylation of STAT protein; microtubule cytoskeleton organization; embryo development ending in birth or egg hatching; positive regulation of microtubule polymerization; positive regulation of cyclin-dependent protein serine/threonine kinase activity; regulation of synaptic vesicle cycle; activation of protein kinase activity
Sources:Amigo / QuickGO
Orthologs
Species	Human	Mouse
Entrez	8851	12569
Ensembl	ENSG00000176749	ENSMUSG00000048895
UniProt	Q15078	P61809
RefSeq (mRNA)	NM_003885	NM_009871
RefSeq (protein)	NP_003876	NP_034001
Location (UCSC)	Chr 17: 32.49 – 32.49 Mb	Chr 11: 80.37 – 80.37 Mb
PubMed search
- Wikidata
View/Edit Human	View/Edit Mouse

Cyclin-dependent kinase 5 activator 1 is an enzyme that in humans is encoded by the CDK5R1 gene.

== Function ==
The protein encoded by this gene (p35) is a neuron-specific activator of cyclin-dependent kinase 5 (CDK5); the activation of CDK5 is required for proper development of the central nervous system. The p35 form of this protein is proteolytically cleaved by calpain, generating a p25 form. The cleavage of p35 into p25 results in relocalization of the protein from the cell periphery to nuclear and perinuclear regions. P25 deregulates CDK5 activity by prolonging its activation and changing its cellular location. The p25 form accumulates in the brain neurons of patients with Alzheimer's disease. This accumulation correlates with an increase in CDK5 kinase activity, and may lead to aberrantly phosphorylated forms of the microtubule-associated protein tau, which contributes to Alzheimer's disease.

In melanocytic cells CDK5R1 gene expression may be regulated by MITF.

== Interactions ==
CDK5R1 has been shown to interact with:

- Actinin, alpha 1
- Amphiphysin,
- Beta-catenin,
- CAMK2A,
- CDK5RAP2,
- Cyclin-dependent kinase 5,
- Protein SET,

== See also ==
- CDK5RAP1
- CDK5RAP2
- CDK5RAP3
