= Alpha-actinin-1 =

Protein-coding gene in the species Homo sapiens

ACTN1
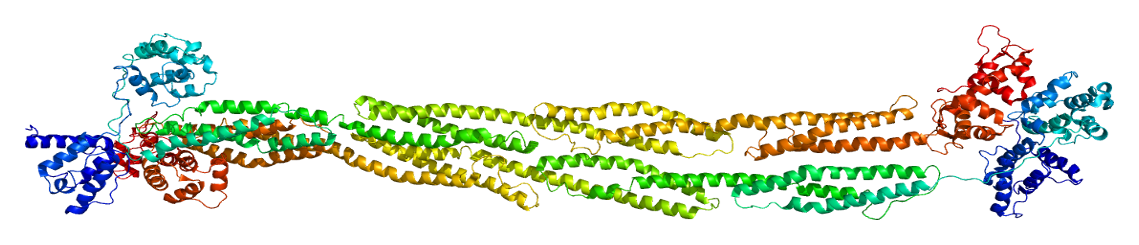

Identifiers
- Aliases: ACTN1, BDPLT15, actinin alpha 1
- External IDs: OMIM: 102575; MGI: 2137706; GeneCards: ACTN1
Available structures
PDB	Ortholog search: PDBe RCSB
PDB	List of PDB id codes 2EYI, 2EYN, 2N8Z, 2N8Y

Gene location (Human)
Chr.	Chromosome 14 (human)
Band	14q24.1|14q22-q24	Start	68,874,128 bp
Band	14q24.1|14q22-q24	End	68,979,440 bp

Gene location (Mouse)
Chr.	Chromosome 12 (mouse)
Band	12 C3|12 36.49 cM	Start	80,214,321 bp
Band	12 C3|12 36.49 cM	End	80,307,145 bp
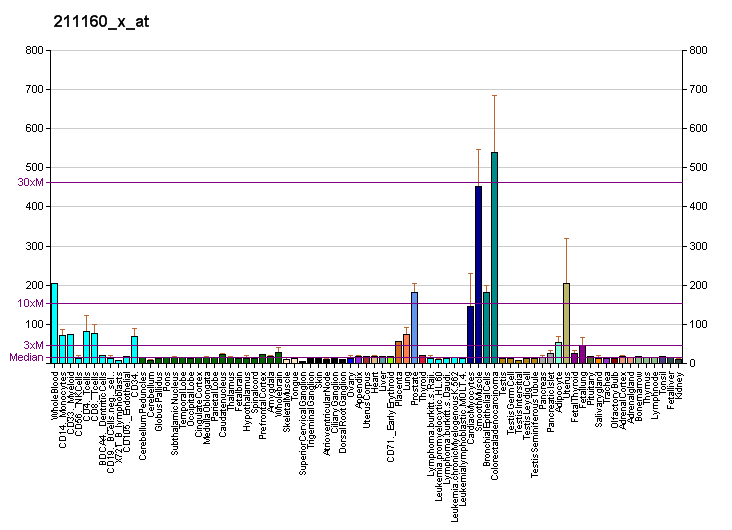

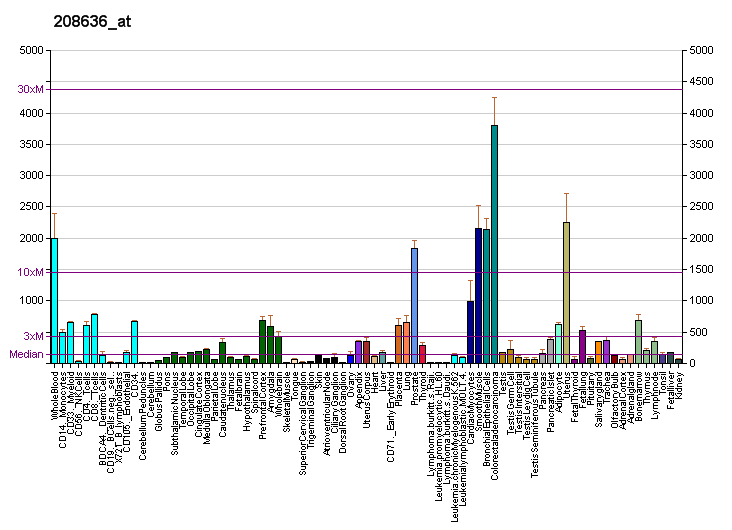

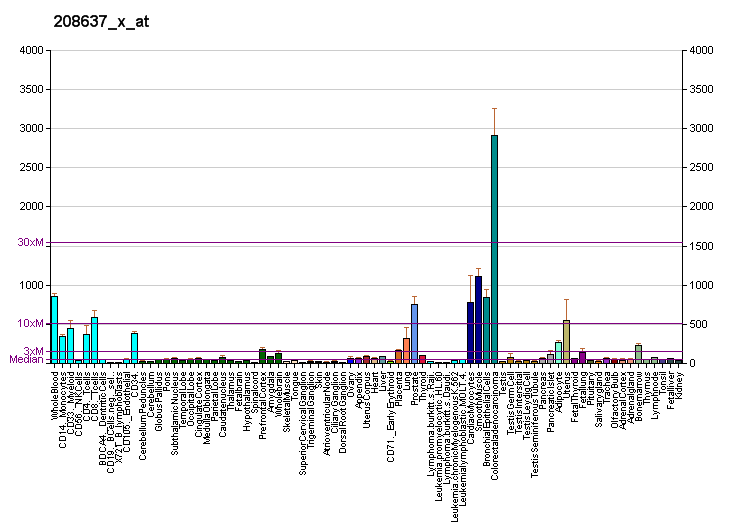
RNA expression pattern
Bgee	Human / Mouse (ortholog); Top expressed in: saphenous vein; ascending aorta; right coronary artery; popliteal artery; tibial arteries; stromal cell of endometrium; Descending thoracic aorta; smooth muscle tissue; myometrium; gastric mucosa / Top expressed in: vestibular membrane of cochlear duct; Ileal epithelium; granulocyte; stria vascularis; tunica media of zone of aorta; endothelial cell of lymphatic vessel; ascending aorta; external carotid artery; internal carotid artery; ciliary body; More reference expression data
BioGPS	More reference expression data
Gene ontology
Molecular function	calcium ion binding; protein homodimerization activity; transmembrane transporter binding; vinculin binding; metal ion binding; integrin binding; actin filament binding; protein binding; nuclear receptor coactivator activity; double-stranded RNA binding; actin binding; structural constituent of postsynapse
Cellular component	cytoplasm; cytosol; cell projection; pseudopodium; membrane; cell-cell junction; focal adhesion; ruffle; plasma membrane; intracellular anatomical structure; stress fiber; extracellular region; cell junction; Z discdkac; brush border; actin filament; fascia adherens; extracellular exosome; cytoskeleton; platelet alpha granule lumen; sarcomere; extracellular space; glutamatergic synapse
Biological process	regulation of apoptotic process; actin filament organization; actin filament network formation; platelet degranulation; platelet formation; actin filament bundle assembly; focal adhesion assembly; actin crosslink formation; platelet morphogenesis; platelet aggregation; platelet activation; regulation of nucleic acid-templated transcription; postsynapse organization; positive regulation of nucleic acid-templated transcription
Sources:Amigo / QuickGO
Orthologs
Databases	NCBI: entry; OMA: entry
Species	Human	Mouse
Entrez	87	109711
Ensembl	ENSG00000072110	ENSMUSG00000015143
UniProt	P12814	Q7TPR4
RefSeq (mRNA)	NM_001102; NM_001130004; NM_001130005	NM_134156; NM_001346669; NM_001379075; NM_001379076
RefSeq (protein)	NP_001093; NP_001123476; NP_001123477; NP_001093.1	NP_001333598; NP_598917; NP_001366004; NP_001366005
Location (UCSC)	Chr 14: 68.87 – 68.98 Mb	Chr 12: 80.21 – 80.31 Mb
PubMed search
- Wikidata
View/Edit Human	View/Edit Mouse

Alpha-actinin-1 is a protein that in humans is encoded by the ACTN1 gene.

== Function ==
Alpha actinins belong to the spectrin gene superfamily which represents a diverse group of cytoskeletal proteins, including the alpha and beta spectrins and dystrophins. Alpha-actinin-1 is an F-actin cross-linking protein – a bundling protein that is thought to anchor actin to a number of intracellular structures. Alpha-actinin-1 is a non-muscle cytoskeletal isoform found along microfilament bundles and adherens-type junctions, where it is involved in binding actin to the membrane. In contrast, skeletal, cardiac, and smooth muscle isoforms are localized to the Z-disc and analogous dense bodies, where they help anchor the myofibrillar actin filaments.

== Interactions ==
Alpha-actinin-1 has been shown to interact with:

- CDK5R1,
- CDK5R2,
- Collagen, type XVII, alpha 1,
- GIPC1,
- PDLIM1,
- Protein kinase N1,
- SSX2IP, and
- Zyxin.
- PTPRT (PTPrho)

== See also ==
- Actinin
