= CDK5RAP3 =

Protein-coding gene in humans

Identifiers
- Aliases: CDK5RAP3, C53, HSF-27, IC53, LZAP, MST016, OK/SW-cl.114, PP1553, CDK5 regulatory subunit associated protein 3
- External IDs: OMIM: 608202; MGI: 1933126; HomoloGene: 12718; GeneCards: CDK5RAP3; OMA:CDK5RAP3 - orthologs

Gene location (Human)
Chr.	Chromosome 17 (human)
Band	17q21.32	Start	47,967,810 bp
Band	17q21.32	End	47,981,781 bp

Gene location (Mouse)
Chr.	Chromosome 11 (mouse)
Band	11|11 D	Start	96,798,252 bp
Band	11|11 D	End	96,807,322 bp
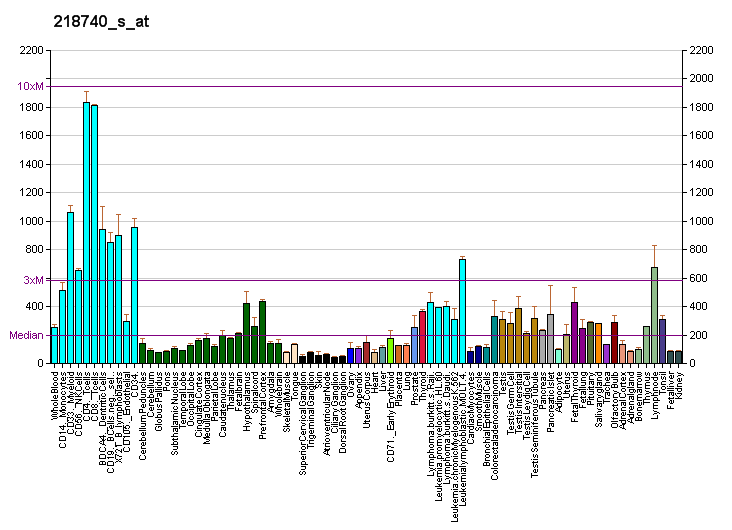
RNA expression pattern
Bgee	Human / Mouse (ortholog); Top expressed in: pituitary gland; right uterine tube; anterior pituitary; right lobe of thyroid gland; body of pancreas; left lobe of thyroid gland; spleen; right hemisphere of cerebellum; left testis; right testis / Top expressed in: lacrimal gland; yolk sac; molar; parotid gland; left lobe of liver; seminal vesicula; spermatocyte; spermatid; islet of Langerhans; primitive streak; More reference expression data
BioGPS	More reference expression data
Gene ontology
Molecular function	MDM2/MDM4 family protein binding; NF-kappaB binding; mitogen-activated protein kinase binding; protein binding; ubiquitin-like protein ligase binding; protein kinase binding; cyclin binding
Cellular component	cytoplasm; centrosome; membrane; microtubule organizing center; nucleolus; microtubule; cytoskeleton; endomembrane system; nucleus; cytosol; protein-containing complex
Biological process	negative regulation of protein phosphorylation; regulation of neuron differentiation; protein ufmylation; positive regulation of signal transduction by p53 class mediator; regulation of phosphatase activity; endoplasmic reticulum unfolded protein response; mitotic G2/M transition checkpoint; brain development; apoptotic nuclear changes; negative regulation of MAP kinase activity; positive regulation of ubiquitin-dependent protein catabolic process; negative regulation of protein kinase activity by regulation of protein phosphorylation; negative regulation of protein serine/threonine kinase activity; cell population proliferation; mitotic G2 DNA damage checkpoint signaling; negative regulation of NF-kappaB transcription factor activity; positive regulation of protein ubiquitination; positive regulation of transcription by RNA polymerase II; positive regulation of protein localization to nucleus; regulation of cyclin-dependent protein serine/threonine kinase activity; regulation of mitotic cell cycle
Sources:Amigo / QuickGO
Orthologs
Species	Human	Mouse
Entrez	80279	80280
Ensembl	ENSG00000108465	ENSMUSG00000018669
UniProt	Q96JB5	Q99LM2
RefSeq (mRNA)	NM_001278197; NM_001278198; NM_001278216; NM_001278217; NM_025197 NM_176095; NM_176096	NM_030248; NM_001308183; NM_001363255; NM_001363256
RefSeq (protein)	NP_001265126; NP_001265127; NP_001265145; NP_001265146; NP_788276	NP_001295112; NP_084524; NP_001350184; NP_001350185
Location (UCSC)	Chr 17: 47.97 – 47.98 Mb	Chr 11: 96.8 – 96.81 Mb
PubMed search
- Wikidata
View/Edit Human	View/Edit Mouse

CDK5 regulatory subunit-associated protein 3 is a protein that in humans is encoded by the CDK5RAP3 gene.

Neuronal CDC2-like kinase, which is involved in the regulation of neuronal differentiation, is composed of a catalytic subunit, CDK5, and an activating subunit, p25NCK5A. The protein encoded by this gene binds to p25NCK5A and therefore may be involved in neuronal differentiation. The encoded protein, which may be a substrate of neuronal CDC2-like kinase, has also been found in vascular endothelial cells, where it mediates cell proliferation.
