= CDK5R2 =

Protein-coding gene in humans

Identifiers
- Aliases: CDK5R2, NCK5AI, P39, p39nck5ai, cyclin-dependent kinase 5, regulatory subunit 2 (p39), cyclin dependent kinase 5 regulatory subunit 2
- External IDs: OMIM: 603764; MGI: 1330828; HomoloGene: 2924; GeneCards: CDK5R2; OMA:CDK5R2 - orthologs

Gene location (Human)
Chr.	Chromosome 2 (human)
Band	2q35	Start	218,959,666 bp
Band	2q35	End	218,962,155 bp

Gene location (Mouse)
Chr.	Chromosome 1 (mouse)
Band	1|1 C4	Start	74,894,093 bp
Band	1|1 C4	End	74,896,891 bp
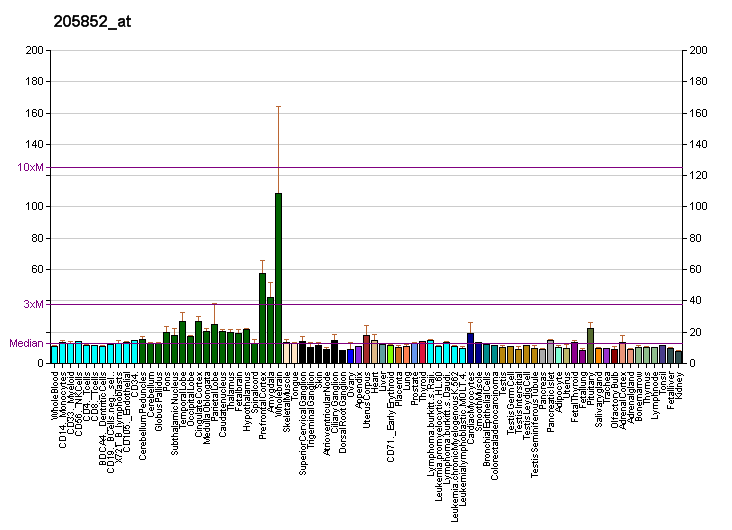
RNA expression pattern
Bgee	Human / Mouse (ortholog); Top expressed in: prefrontal cortex; Brodmann area 9; right frontal lobe; putamen; nucleus accumbens; cingulate gyrus; anterior cingulate cortex; lateral nuclear group of thalamus; caudate nucleus; pituitary gland / Top expressed in: superior frontal gyrus; neural layer of retina; supraoptic nucleus; dentate gyrus of hippocampal formation granule cell; primary visual cortex; prefrontal cortex; cerebellar cortex; lateral septal nucleus; olfactory tubercle; hippocampus proper; More reference expression data
BioGPS	More reference expression data
Gene ontology
Molecular function	cyclin-dependent protein serine/threonine kinase activator activity; lipid binding; actin binding
Cellular component	cytoplasm; protein kinase 5 complex; plasma membrane; membrane; growth cone; neuron projection
Biological process	positive regulation of protein kinase activity; regulation of cyclin-dependent protein serine/threonine kinase activity; neuron migration; hippocampus development; layer formation in cerebral cortex; cerebellum development; positive regulation of protein serine/threonine kinase activity; superior olivary nucleus maturation; positive regulation of calcium ion-dependent exocytosis; positive regulation of cyclin-dependent protein serine/threonine kinase activity
Sources:Amigo / QuickGO
Orthologs
Species	Human	Mouse
Entrez	8941	12570
Ensembl	ENSG00000171450	ENSMUSG00000090071
UniProt	Q13319	O35926
RefSeq (mRNA)	NM_003936	NM_009872
RefSeq (protein)	NP_003927	NP_034002
Location (UCSC)	Chr 2: 218.96 – 218.96 Mb	Chr 1: 74.89 – 74.9 Mb
PubMed search
- Wikidata
View/Edit Human	View/Edit Mouse

Cyclin-dependent kinase 5 activator 2 is an enzyme that in humans is encoded by the CDK5R2 gene.

The protein encoded by this gene is a neuron-specific activator of CDK5 kinase. It associates with CDK5 to form an active kinase. This protein and neuron-specific CDK5 activator CDK5R1/p39NCK5A both share limited similarity to cyclins, and thus may define a distinct family of cyclin-dependent kinase-activating proteins.

== Interactions ==
CDK5R2 has been shown to interact with Actinin, alpha 1.
