= CDK5RAP1 =

Protein-coding gene in humans

Identifiers
- Aliases: CDK5RAP1, C20orf34, C42, CGI-05, HSPC167, CDK5 regulatory subunit associated protein 1
- External IDs: OMIM: 608200; MGI: 1914221; GeneCards: CDK5RAP1
Enzyme activity
EC #	BRENDA	ExPASy	KEGG	MetaCyc
2.8.4.3	↗	↗	↗	↗

Gene location (Human)
Chr.	Chromosome 20 (human)
Band	20q11.21	Start	33,358,839 bp
Band	20q11.21	End	33,401,561 bp

Gene location (Mouse)
Chr.	Chromosome 2 (mouse)
Band	2|2 H1	Start	154,177,300 bp
Band	2|2 H1	End	154,214,930 bp
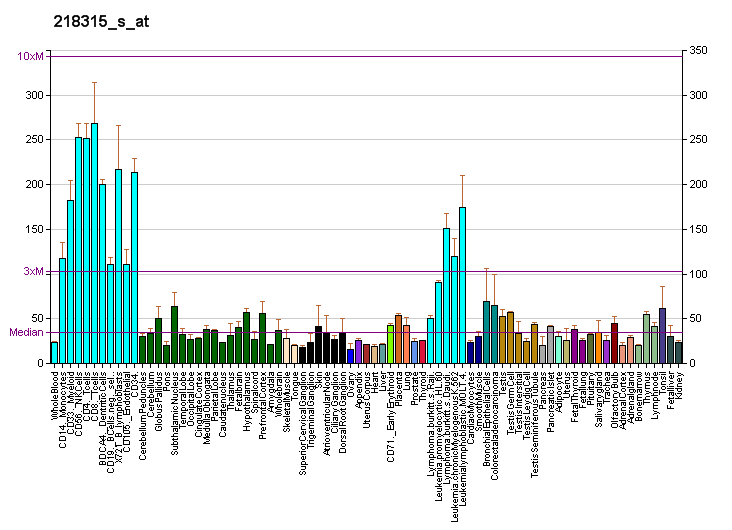
RNA expression pattern
Bgee	Human / Mouse (ortholog); Top expressed in: granulocyte; right lobe of thyroid gland; apex of heart; left lobe of thyroid gland; skin of leg; cerebellar hemisphere; right hemisphere of cerebellum; skin of abdomen; gonad; spleen / Top expressed in: primary oocyte; muscle of thigh; right kidney; proximal tubule; morula; thoracic diaphragm; spermatocyte; skeletal muscle tissue; blastocyst; soleus muscle; More reference expression data
BioGPS	More reference expression data
Gene ontology
Molecular function	protein-containing complex binding; transferase activity; iron-sulfur cluster binding; catalytic activity; protein kinase binding; metal ion binding; N6-isopentenyladenosine methylthiotransferase activity; 4 iron, 4 sulfur cluster binding
Cellular component	cytoplasm; mitochondrion; cellular component
Biological process	regulation of neuron differentiation; brain development; regulation of cyclin-dependent protein serine/threonine kinase activity; negative regulation of cyclin-dependent protein serine/threonine kinase activity; tRNA modification; positive regulation of mitochondrial translation; mitochondrial tRNA modification; positive regulation of translational fidelity; tRNA methylthiolation; RNA modification
Sources:Amigo / QuickGO
Orthologs
Databases	NCBI: entry; OMA: entry
Species	Human	Mouse
Entrez	51654	66971
Ensembl	ENSG00000101391	ENSMUSG00000027487
UniProt	Q96SZ6	Q8BTW8
RefSeq (mRNA)	NM_001278167; NM_001278168; NM_001278169; NM_016082; NM_016408 NM_001365728	NM_025876
RefSeq (protein)	NP_001265096; NP_001265097; NP_001265098; NP_057166; NP_057492 NP_001352657	NP_080152
Location (UCSC)	Chr 20: 33.36 – 33.4 Mb	Chr 2: 154.18 – 154.21 Mb
PubMed search
- Wikidata
View/Edit Human	View/Edit Mouse

CDK5 regulatory subunit-associated protein 1 is a protein that in humans is encoded by the CDK5RAP1 gene.

Neuronal CDC2-like kinase, which is involved in the regulation of neuronal differentiation, is composed of a catalytic subunit, CDK5, and an activating subunit, p25NCK5A. The protein encoded by this gene binds to p25NCK5A and therefore may be involved in neuronal differentiation. Multiple transcript variants exist for this gene, but the full-length natures of only two have been determined.
