= Protein N-terminal methyltransferase =

Identifiers
- EC no.: 2.1.1.244

Databases
- IntEnz: IntEnz view
- BRENDA: BRENDA entry
- ExPASy: NiceZyme view
- KEGG: KEGG entry
- MetaCyc: metabolic pathway
- PRIAM: profile
- PDB structures: RCSB PDB PDBe PDBsum
Search
- PMC: articles
- PubMed: articles
- NCBI: proteins

Protein N-terminal methyltransferase (EC 2.1.1.244, NMT1 (gene), METTL11A (gene)) is an enzyme with systematic name S-adenosyl-L-methionine:N-terminal-(A,P,S)PK-(protein) methyltransferase. This enzyme catalyses the following chemical reaction

(1) 3 S-adenosyl-L-methionine + N-terminal-(A,S)PK-[protein] $\rightleftharpoons$ 3 S-adenosyl-L-homocysteine + N-terminal-N,N,N-trimethyl-N-(A,S)PK-[protein] (overall reaction)
(1a) S-adenosyl-L-methionine + N-terminal-(A,S)PK-[protein] $\rightleftharpoons$ S-adenosyl-L-homocysteine + N-terminal-N-methyl-N-(A,S)PK-[protein]
(1b) S-adenosyl-L-methionine + N-terminal-N-methyl-N-(A,S)PK-[protein] $\rightleftharpoons$ S-adenosyl-L-homocysteine + N-terminal-N,N-dimethyl-N-(A,S)PK-[protein]
(1c) S-adenosyl-L-methionine + N-terminal-N,N-dimethyl-N-(A,S)PK-serine-[protein] $\rightleftharpoons$ S-adenosyl-L-homocysteine + N-terminal-N,N,N-trimethyl-N-(A,S)PK-[protein]
(2) 2 S-adenosyl-L-methionine + N-terminal-PPK-[protein] $\rightleftharpoons$ 2 S-adenosyl-L-homocysteine + N-terminal-N,N-dimethyl-N-PPK-[protein] (overall reaction)
(2a) S-adenosyl-L-methionine + N-terminal-PPK-[protein] $\rightleftharpoons$ S-adenosyl-L-homocysteine + N-terminal-N-methyl-N-PPK-[protein]
(2b) S-adenosyl-L-methionine + N-terminal-N-methyl-N-PPK-[protein] $\rightleftharpoons$ S-adenosyl-L-homocysteine + N-terminal-N,N-dimethyl-N-PPK-[protein]

This enzyme methylates the N-terminus of target proteins containing the N-terminal motif [Ala/Pro/Ser]-Pro-Lys.
