= MARCKS =

Protein-coding gene in the species Homo sapiens

Identifiers
- Aliases: MARCKS, 80K-L, MACS, PKCSL, PRKCSL, myristoylated alanine rich protein kinase C substrate
- External IDs: OMIM: 177061; MGI: 96907; GeneCards: MARCKS
Available structures
PDB	Ortholog search: PDBe RCSB
PDB	List of PDB id codes 1IWQ

Gene location (Human)
Chr.	Chromosome 6 (human)
Band	6q21	Start	113,857,345 bp
Band	6q21	End	113,863,475 bp

Gene location (Mouse)
Chr.	Chromosome 10 (mouse)
Band	10 B1|10 19.49 cM	Start	37,009,371 bp
Band	10 B1|10 19.49 cM	End	37,014,916 bp
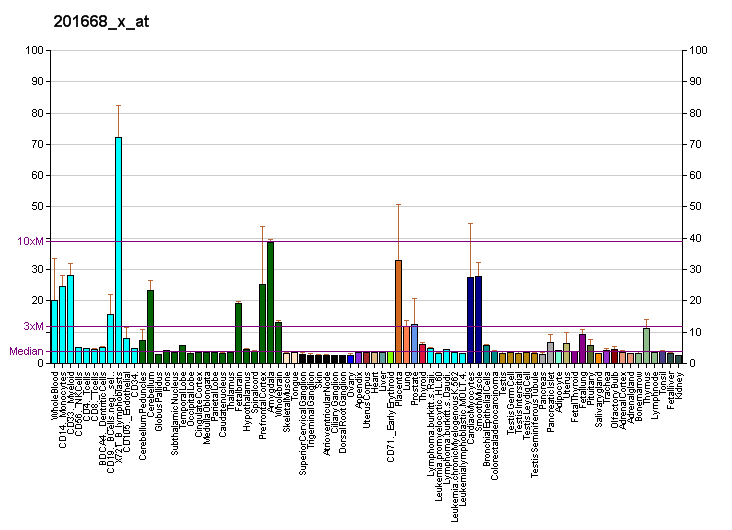

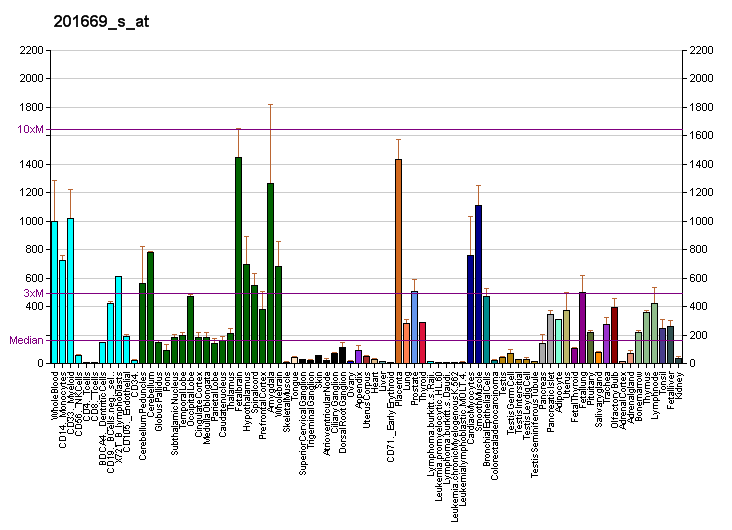

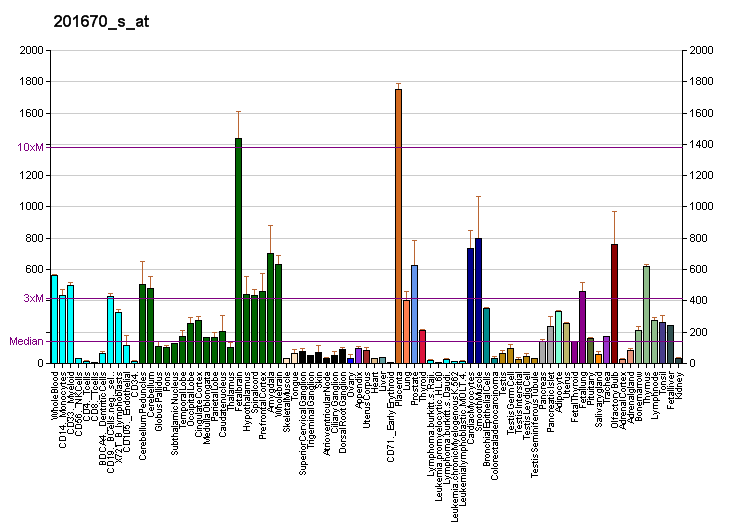
RNA expression pattern
Bgee	Human / Mouse (ortholog); Top expressed in: ventricular zone; ganglionic eminence; buccal mucosa cell; mucosa of colon; mucosa of sigmoid colon; internal globus pallidus; trigeminal ganglion; bronchial epithelial cell; mucosa of paranasal sinus; superior vestibular nucleus / Top expressed in: Rostral migratory stream; medial ganglionic eminence; dermis; Gonadal ridge; abdominal wall; vas deferens; fossa; external carotid artery; human fetus; left lung lobe; More reference expression data
BioGPS	More reference expression data
Gene ontology
Molecular function	calmodulin binding; actin binding; protein kinase C binding; identical protein binding; actin filament binding
Cellular component	cytoplasm; germinal vesicle; centrosome; membrane; focal adhesion; cell cortex; actin cytoskeleton; extracellular exosome; cytoskeleton; plasma membrane; actin filament bundle
Biological process	regulation of insulin secretion; actin filament bundle assembly; protein homooligomerization; actin crosslink formation
Sources:Amigo / QuickGO
Orthologs
Databases	NCBI: entry; OMA: entry
Species	Human	Mouse
Entrez	4082	17118
Ensembl	ENSG00000277443	ENSMUSG00000069662
UniProt	P29966	P26645
RefSeq (mRNA)	NM_002356	NM_008538
RefSeq (protein)	NP_002347	NP_032564
Location (UCSC)	Chr 6: 113.86 – 113.86 Mb	Chr 10: 37.01 – 37.01 Mb
PubMed search
- Wikidata
View/Edit Human	View/Edit Mouse

Myristoylated alanine-rich C-kinase substrate is a protein that in humans is encoded by the MARCKS gene. It plays important roles in cell shape, cell motility, secretion, transmembrane transport, regulation of the cell cycle, and neural development. Recently, MARCKS has been implicated in the exocytosis of a number of vesicles and granules such as mucin and chromaffin. It is also the name of a protein family, of which MARCKS is the most studied member. They are intrinsically disordered proteins, with an acidic pH, with high proportions of alanine, glycine, proline, and glutamic acid. They are membrane-bound through a lipid anchor at the N-terminus, and a polybasic domain in the middle. They are regulated by Ca^{2+}/calmodulin and protein kinase C. In their unphosphorylated form, they bind to actin filaments, causing them to crosslink, and sequester acidic membrane phospholipids such as PIP_{2}.

The protein encoded by this gene is a substrate for protein kinase C. It is localized to the plasma membrane and is an actin filament crosslinking protein. Phosphorylation by protein kinase C or binding to calcium-calmodulin inhibits its association with actin and with the plasma membrane, leading to its presence in the cytoplasm. The protein is thought to be involved in cell motility, phagocytosis, membrane trafficking and mitogenesis. MARCKS has been shown to regulate the Toll-like receptor pathway in macrophages

== Interactions ==
MARCKS has been shown to interact with TOB1 and with NMT2.
