= Cdk5 and Abl enzyme substrate 2 =

Protein found in humans

An Error has occurred retrieving Wikidata item for infobox

Cdk5 and Abl enzyme substrate 2 is a protein that in humans is encoded by the CABLES2 gene.
