= Glycylpeptide N-tetradecanoyltransferase 1 =

Protein-coding gene in the species Homo sapiens

NMT1
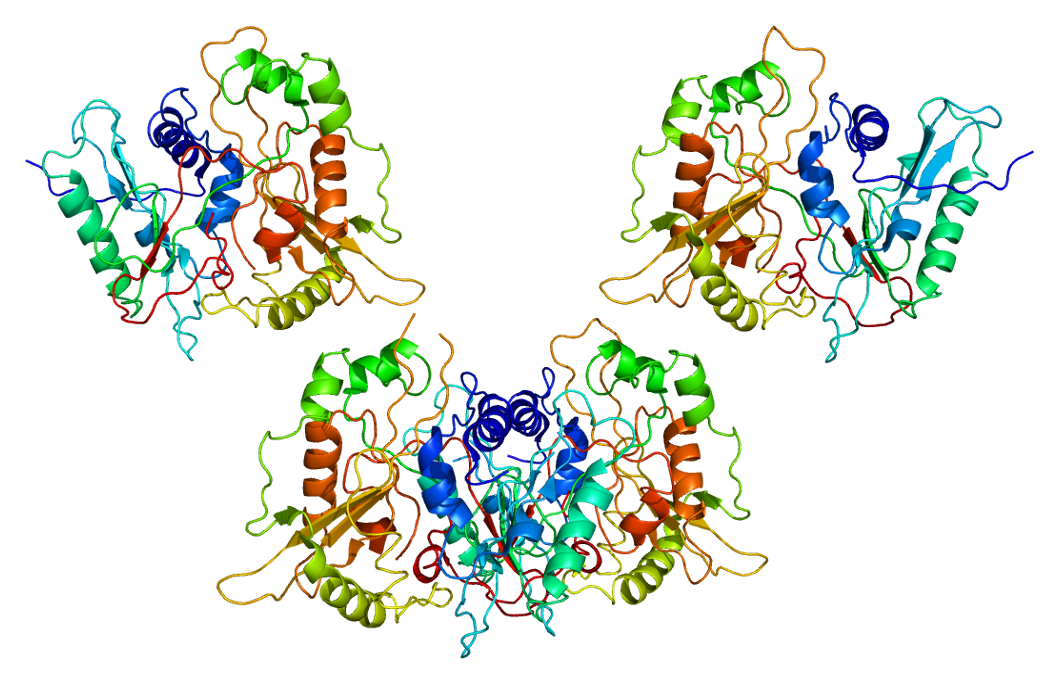

Identifiers
- Aliases: NMT1, Nmt1, AW536594, NMT, N-myristoyltransferase 1
- External IDs: OMIM: 160993; MGI: 102579; GeneCards: NMT1
Available structures
| PDB | Ortholog search: PDBe RCSB |
| PDB | List of PDB id codes 1RXT, 3IU1, 3IU2, 3IWE, 3JTK, 4C2Y, 4C2Z |
Enzyme activity
| EC # | BRENDA | ExPASy | KEGG | MetaCyc |
|---|---|---|---|---|
| 2.3.1.97 | ↗ | ↗ | ↗ | ↗ |

Gene location (Human)
| Chr. | Chromosome 17 (human) |
| Band | 17q21.31 | Start | 44,957,992 bp |
| Band | 17q21.31 | End | 45,109,016 bp |

Gene location (Mouse)
| Chr. | Chromosome 11 (mouse) |
| Band | 11|11 E1 | Start | 102,919,016 bp |
| Band | 11|11 E1 | End | 102,959,738 bp |
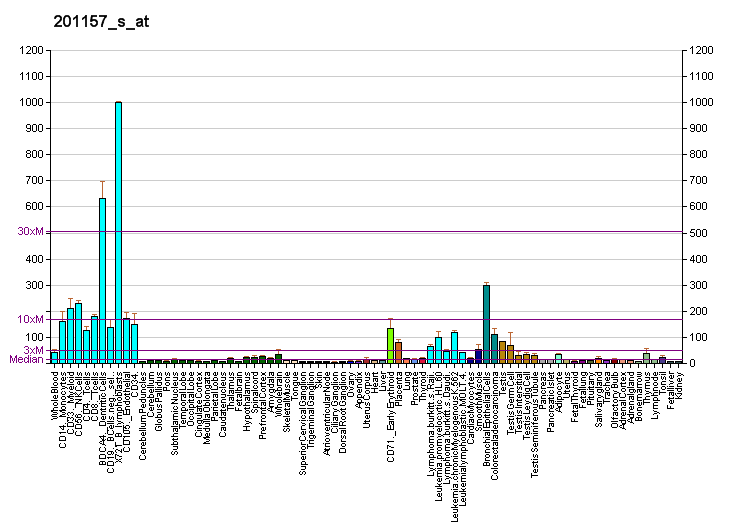

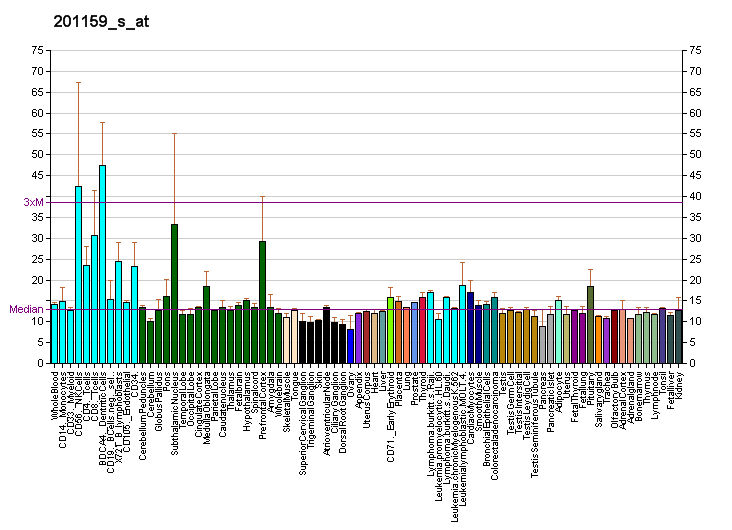

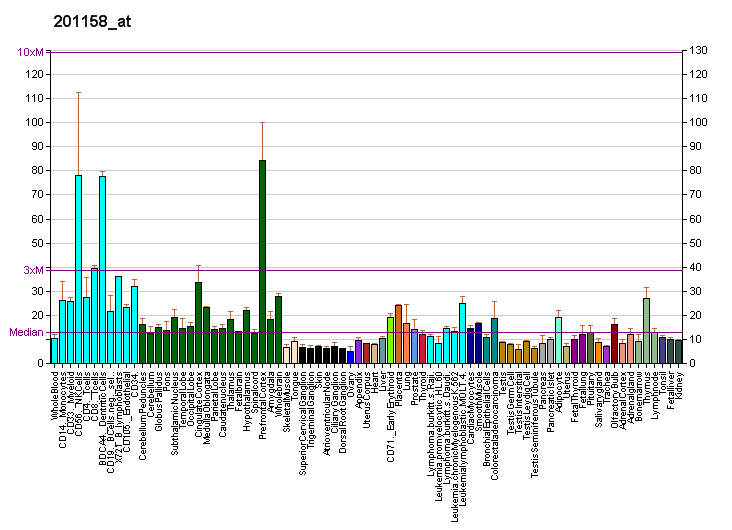
RNA expression pattern
| Bgee | Human / Mouse (ortholog); Top expressed in: monocyte; right adrenal gland; islet of Langerhans; sural nerve; gastrocnemius muscle; left adrenal gland; right adrenal cortex; Achilles tendon; left adrenal cortex; granulocyte / Top expressed in: Ileal epithelium; endothelial cell of lymphatic vessel; vestibular membrane of cochlear duct; Paneth cell; primitive streak; lacrimal gland; gastrula; decidua; interventricular septum; hair follicle; More reference expression data |
| BioGPS | More reference expression data |
Gene ontology
| Molecular function | transferase activity; acyltransferase activity; glycylpeptide N-tetradecanoyltransferase activity; myristoyltransferase activity |
| Cellular component | membrane; plasma membrane; extrinsic component of membrane; cytoplasm; mitochondrion; cytosol |
| Biological process | regulation of rhodopsin mediated signaling pathway; in utero embryonic development; positive regulation of protein insertion into mitochondrial membrane involved in apoptotic signaling pathway; N-terminal peptidyl-glycine N-myristoylation; N-terminal protein myristoylation; cellular ketone metabolic process |
Sources:Amigo / QuickGO
Orthologs
| Databases | NCBI: entry; OMA: entry |
| Species | Human | Mouse |
| Entrez | 4836 | 18107 |
| Ensembl | ENSG00000136448 | ENSMUSG00000020936 |
| UniProt | P30419 | O70310 |
| RefSeq (mRNA) | NM_021079 | NM_008707 |
| RefSeq (protein) | NP_066565 | NP_032733 |
| Location (UCSC) | Chr 17: 44.96 – 45.11 Mb | Chr 11: 102.92 – 102.96 Mb |
| PubMed search |
- Wikidata
| View/Edit Human | View/Edit Mouse |

Glycylpeptide N-tetradecanoyltransferase 1 also known as myristoyl-CoA:protein N-myristoyltransferase 1 (NMT-1) is an enzyme that in humans is encoded by the NMT1 gene. It belongs to the protein N-terminal methyltransferase and glycylpeptide N-tetradecanoyltransferase family of enzymes. This enzyme can be inhibited by NMT inhibitors.

== See also ==
- Myristoylation
- N-myristoyltransferase 2
