= Myristoyl-CoA =

Names
- Other names Myristoyl-coenzyme A

Identifiers
CAS Number	3130-72-1
3D model (JSmol)	Interactive image
PubChem CID	11966124
CompTox Dashboard (EPA)	DTXSID00953340
- SMILES: CCCCCCCCCCCCCC(=O)SCCNC(=O)CCNC(=O)[C@@H](C(C)(C)COP(=O)(O)OP(=O)(O)OC[C@@H]1[C@H]([C@H]([C@@H](O1)N2C=NC3=C(N=CN=C32)N)O)OP(=O)(O)O)O

Properties
Chemical formula	C_{35}H_{62}N_{7}O_{17}P_{3}S
Molar mass	977.89 g·mol^{−1}
- Except where otherwise noted, data are given for materials in their standard state (at 25 °C [77 °F], 100 kPa). Infobox references

Myristoyl-CoA is a 14-carbon fatty acyl-CoA derivative formed by the covalent attachment of myristate to coenzyme A in a reaction catalyzed by myristoyl-CoA synthetase. Myristoyl-CoA serves as the primary donor molecule for myristoylation, a post-translational modification in which the myristoyl group is covalently attached to the lysine or N-terminal glycine residue of a target protein. Whereas myristoyl-CoA synthesis is catalyzed by myristoyl-CoA synthetase, protein myristoylation is catalyzed by N-myristoyltransferases (NMTs).

Myristoyl-CoA also acts as an intermediate in the β-oxidation of fatty acids, and in other lipid synthesis pathways.
