= Glycylpeptide N-tetradecanoyltransferase 2 =

Protein-coding gene in the species Homo sapiens

Human N-myristoyltransferase 2
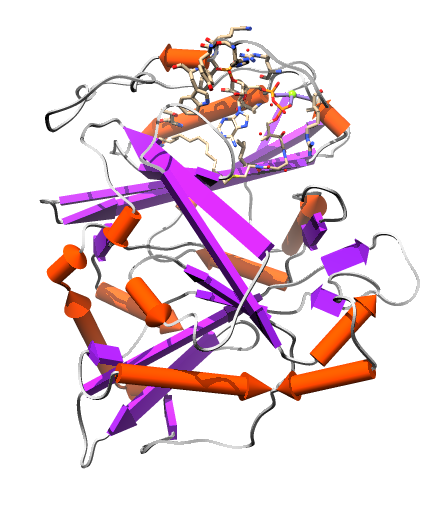
- Human N-myristoyltransferase isoform 2 (NMT2) (based on PDB: 4c2x)

Identifiers
- Symbol: NMT2
- Pfam: PF01233
- InterPro: IPR022676
Available protein structures:
- PDB: IPR022676 PF01233 (ECOD; PDBsum)
- AlphaFold: IPR022676; PF01233

NMT2

Identifiers
- Aliases: NMT2, N-myristoyltransferase 2
- External IDs: OMIM: 603801; MGI: 1202298; GeneCards: NMT2
Available structures
PDB	Ortholog search: PDBe RCSB
PDB	List of PDB id codes 4C2X
Enzyme activity
EC #	BRENDA	ExPASy	KEGG	MetaCyc
2.3.1.97	↗	↗	↗	↗

Gene location (Human)
Chr.	Chromosome 10 (human)
Band	10p13	Start	15,102,584 bp
Band	10p13	End	15,168,693 bp

Gene location (Mouse)
Chr.	Chromosome 2 (mouse)
Band	2|2 A1	Start	3,285,249 bp
Band	2|2 A1	End	3,329,914 bp
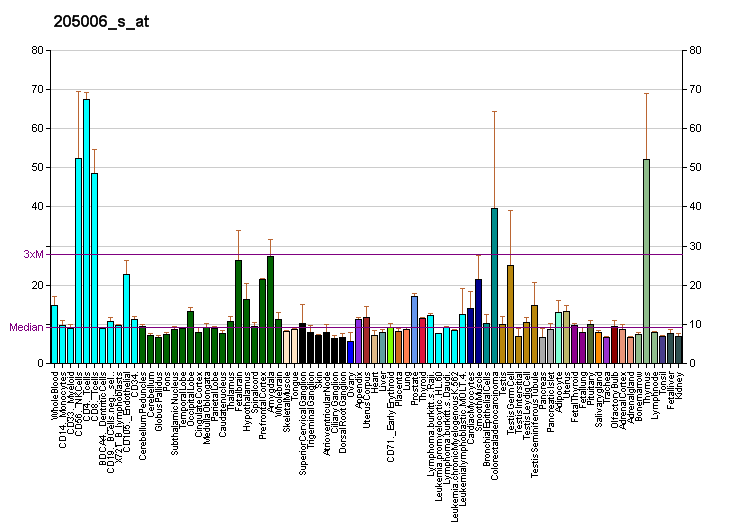

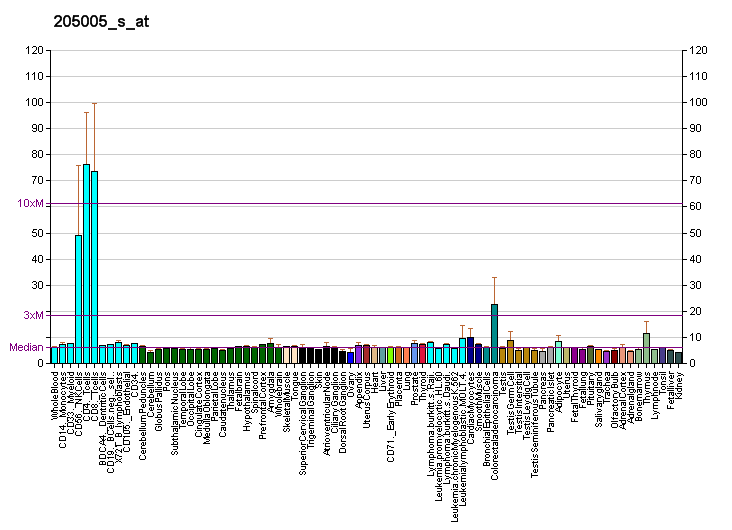
RNA expression pattern
Bgee	Human / Mouse (ortholog); Top expressed in: endothelial cell; ventricular zone; adipose tissue; subcutaneous adipose tissue; cerebellar hemisphere; ganglionic eminence; right hemisphere of cerebellum; abdominal fat; tibia; lateral nuclear group of thalamus / Top expressed in: cumulus cell; substantia nigra; Rostral migratory stream; medial dorsal nucleus; medullary collecting duct; medial geniculate nucleus; atrioventricular valve; retinal pigment epithelium; lateral geniculate nucleus; condyle; More reference expression data
BioGPS	More reference expression data
Gene ontology
Molecular function	transferase activity; acyltransferase activity; glycylpeptide N-tetradecanoyltransferase activity
Cellular component	cytoplasm; plasma membrane; Golgi apparatus; membrane; extrinsic component of membrane; cytosol; host cell
Biological process	regulation of rhodopsin mediated signaling pathway; intracellular transport of virus; N-terminal protein myristoylation; N-terminal peptidyl-glycine N-myristoylation
Sources:Amigo / QuickGO
Orthologs
Databases	NCBI: entry; OMA: entry
Species	Human	Mouse
Entrez	9397	18108
Ensembl	ENSG00000152465	ENSMUSG00000026643
UniProt	O60551	O70311
RefSeq (mRNA)	NM_001308295; NM_004808	NM_001290368; NM_001290369; NM_001290370; NM_008708
RefSeq (protein)	NP_001295224; NP_004799	NP_001277297; NP_001277298; NP_001277299; NP_032734
Location (UCSC)	Chr 10: 15.1 – 15.17 Mb	Chr 2: 3.29 – 3.33 Mb
PubMed search
- Wikidata
View/Edit Human	View/Edit Mouse

Glycylpeptide N-tetradecanoyltransferase 2 known also as N-myristoyltransferase, is an enzyme (EC: 2.3.1.97) that in humans is encoded by the NMT2 gene.

== Function ==
N-myristoyltransferase (NMT) catalyzes the reaction of N-terminal myristoylation of many signaling proteins. It transfers myristic acid from myristoyl coenzyme A to the amino group of a protein's N-terminal glycine residue. Biochemical evidence indicates the presence of several distinct NMTs, varying in apparent molecular weight and /or subcellular distribution. The 496-amino acid of human NMT2 protein shares 77% and 96% sequence identity with human NMT1 and mouse Nmt2 comprise two distinct families of N-myristoyltransferases.

== Interactions ==
NMT2 has been shown to interact with:

- caspase 3
- MARCKS

== See also ==
- N-myristoyltransferase 1
