= Hazara virus =

Virus classification
- (unranked): Virus
- Realm: Riboviria
- Kingdom: Orthornavirae
- Phylum: Negarnaviricota
- Class: Bunyaviricetes
- Order: Hareavirales
- Family: Nairoviridae
- Genus: Orthonairovirus
- Species: Orthonairovirus hazaraense

Synonyms
- Hazara orthonairovirus

Species of virus

In 1954 the Hazara virus, one of the 34 tick-borne viruses of the genus Orthonairovirus, was discovered in Pakistan in the Ixodes tick native to that region. Today this virus is studied in mice in an attempt to develop treatments for the highly pathogenic Crimean-Congo Hemorrhagic Fever virus.

== Characteristics ==
Hazara virus is part of the genus Orthonairovirus of the Nairoviridae family of viruses, which are a family of enveloped negative-stranded RNA viruses with a genome split into three parts—Small (S), Middle (M) and Large (L). The L RNA segment encodes an RNA-dependent RNA polymerase (L protein), the M RNA segment encodes two surface glycoproteins (Gc and Gn), and the S RNA segment encodes a nucleocapsid protein (N). The three genomic RNA segments are encapsidated by copies of the N protein in the form of ribonucleoprotein (RNP) complexes. The N protein is the most abundant viral protein in Bunyaviridae virus particles and infected cells and, therefore, the main target in many serological and molecular diagnostics.

== Transmission ==
Hazara virus is spread by the Ixodes redikorzevi tick. The tick is commonly found on an alpine vole inhabiting the Hazara District of Pakistan.

== Signs and symptoms ==
Hazara virus does not cause disease or symptoms in humans. In laboratory mice, symptoms can mirror those of Crimean-Congo Hemorrhagic Fever virus.

== Diagnosis ==
Diagnosis in rodents is made by detecting Hazara virus antibodies in the serum.

== Clinical importance ==
Hazara virus is in the same nairovirus serogroup as Crimean-Congo hemorrhagic fever virus (CCHFV), and has similar disease progression to that seen in Crimean-Congo Hemorrhagic Fever (CCHF) infections in suckling mice and in the interferon receptor knockout mouse model This indicates that Hazara orthonairovirus could represent a valid model for CCHFV infection.

This finding is particularly important because using the Hazara virus (biosafety level 2) as a model allows scientists to investigate this serogroup of viruses for the development of antivirals, without having to work in a biosafety level 4 environment, which is the highest available level of biosecurity, and is mandatory when working with intact CCHFV. While CCHFV is the most important human pathogen in this serogroup, Hazara research is potentially useful in the development of antiviral medications for all viruses in the genus Orthonairovirus.
