= Nucleoprotein =

Type of protein

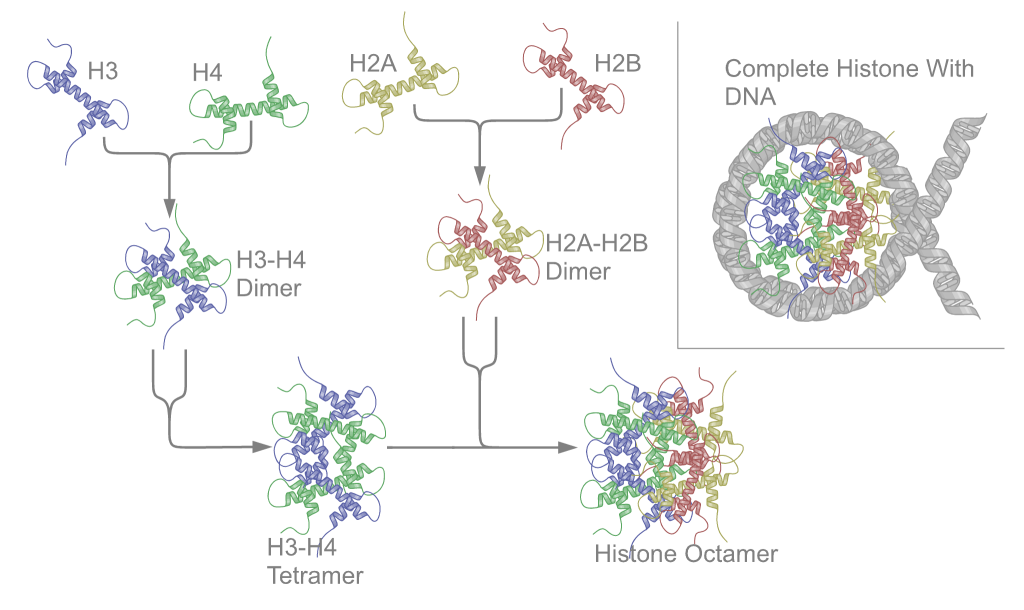
A nucleosome is a combination of DNA + histone proteins.

Nucleoproteins are complexes formed by proteins conjugated with nucleic acids (either DNA or RNA). However It could sometimes mean just a protein relevant to nucleic acid. Typical nucleoproteins include ribosomes, nucleosomes and viral nucleocapsid (caspid + viral genome).

== Structures ==
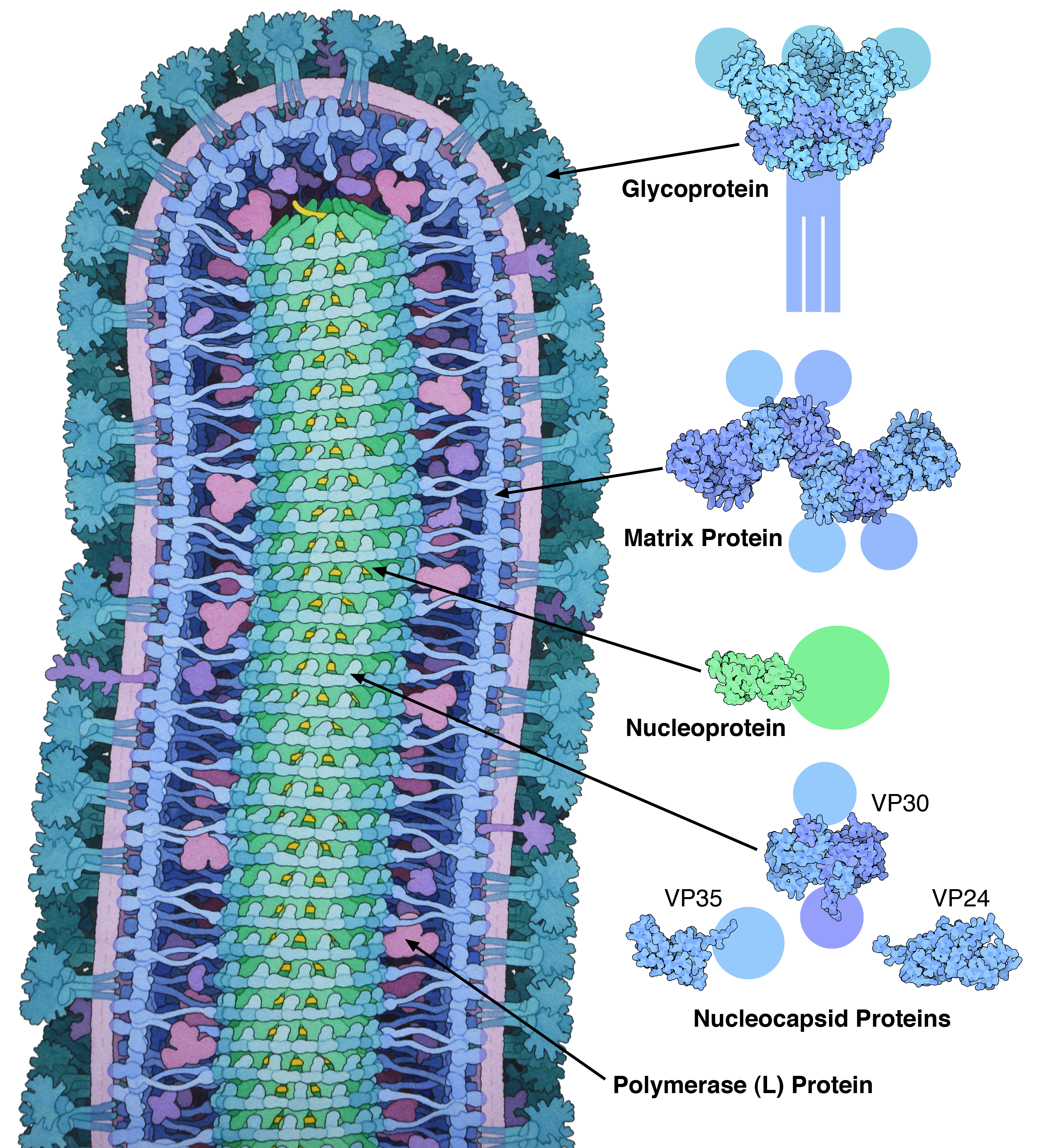
Cross-sectional drawing of the Ebola virus particle, with structures of the major proteins shown and labelled on the right

Nucleoproteins tend to be positively charged. The fact facilitates their interaction with the negatively charged nucleic acid chains. The tertiary structures and biological functions of many nucleoproteins are understood. Important techniques for finding the structures of nucleoproteins include X-ray diffraction, nuclear magnetic resonance and cryo-electron microscopy.

=== Viruses ===
Virus genomes (either DNA or RNA) are extremely tightly packed into the viral capsid. Many viruses are therefore little more than an organised collection of nucleoproteins with their binding sites pointing inwards. Structurally characterised viral nucleoproteins include influenza, rabies, Ebola, Bunyamwera, Schmallenberg, Hazara, Crimean-Congo hemorrhagic fever, and Lassa.

== Deoxyribonucleoproteins ==
A deoxyribonucleoprotein (DNP) is a complex of DNA and protein. The prototypical examples are nucleosomes, complexes in which genomic DNA is wrapped around clusters of eight histone proteins in eukaryotic cell nuclei to form chromatin. Protamines replace histones during spermatogenesis.

=== Functions ===
The most widespread deoxyribonucleoproteins are nucleosomes, in which the component is nuclear DNA. The proteins combined with DNA are histones and protamines; the resulting nucleoproteins are located in chromosomes. Thus, the entire chromosome, i.e. chromatin in eukaryotes consists of such nucleoproteins.

In eukaryotic cells, DNA is associated with about an equal mass of histone proteins in a highly condensed nucleoprotein complex called chromatin. Deoxyribonucleoproteins in this kind of complex interact to generate a multiprotein regulatory complex in which the intervening DNA is looped or wound. The deoxyribonucleoproteins participate in regulating DNA replication and transcription.

Deoxyribonucleoproteins are also involved in homologous recombination, a process for repairing DNA that appears to be nearly universal. A central intermediate step in this process is the interaction of multiple copies of a recombinase protein with single-stranded DNA to form a DNP filament. Recombinases employed in this process are produced by archaea (RadA recombinase), by bacteria (RecA recombinase) and by eukaryotes from yeast to humans (Rad51 and Dmc1 recombinases).

== Ribonucleoproteins ==
Cell nucleus with DNA stained blue, and nucleolin protein in red. The nucleolin protein binds some mRNAs (e.g. mRNA for Interleukin-6). This protects those mRNAs from degradation by Kaposi's sarcoma-associated herpesvirus when infected. This RNA-nucleolin complex is then safely transported to the cytosol for translation by ribosomes to produce the Interleukin-6 protein, which is involved in antiviral immune response.

A ribonucleoprotein (RNP) is a complex of ribonucleic acid and RNA-binding protein. These complexes play an integral part in a number of important biological functions that include transcription, translation and regulating gene expression and regulating the metabolism of RNA. A few examples of RNPs include the ribosome, the enzyme telomerase, vault ribonucleoproteins, RNase P, hnRNP and small nuclear RNPs (snRNPs), which have been implicated in pre-mRNA splicing (spliceosome) and are among the main components of the nucleolus. Some viruses are simple ribonucleoproteins, containing only one molecule of RNA and a number of identical protein molecules. Others are ribonucleoprotein or deoxyribonucleoprotein complexes containing a number of different proteins, and exceptionally more nucleic acid molecules. As of 2018, over 2000 RNPs can be found in the RCSB Protein Data Bank (PDB). Furthermore, the Protein-RNA Interface Data Base (PRIDB) possesses a collection of information on RNA-protein interfaces based on data drawn from the PDB. Some common features of protein-RNA interfaces were deduced based on known structures. For example, RNP in snRNPs have an RNA-binding motif in its RNA-binding protein. Aromatic amino acid residues in this motif result in stacking interactions with RNA. Lysine residues in the helical portion of RNA-binding proteins help to stabilize interactions with nucleic acids. This nucleic acid binding is strengthened by electrostatic attraction between the positive lysine side chains and the negative nucleic acid phosphate backbones. Additionally, it is possible to model RNPs computationally. Although computational methods of deducing RNP structures are less accurate than experimental methods, they provide a rough model of the structure which allows for predictions of the identity of significant amino acids and nucleotide residues. Such information helps in understanding the overall function the RNP.

Cell infected with influenza A virus. Viral ribonucleoprotein particle proteins, stained white, hijack active transport via the endosomes to move more rapidly within the cell than by simple diffusion.

'RNP' can also refer to ribonucleoprotein particles. Ribonucleoprotein particles are distinct intracellular foci for post-transcriptional regulation. These particles play an important role in influenza A virus replication. The influenza viral genome is composed of eight ribonucleoprotein particles formed by a complex of negative-sense RNA bound to a viral nucleoprotein. Each RNP carries with it an RNA polymerase complex. When the nucleoprotein binds to the viral RNA, it is able to expose the nucleotide bases which allow the viral polymerase to transcribe RNA. At this point, once the virus enters a host cell it will be prepared to begin the process of replication.

=== Anti-RNP antibodies ===
Anti-RNP antibodies are autoantibodies associated with mixed connective tissue disease and are also detected in nearly 40% of Lupus erythematosus patients. Two types of anti-RNP antibodies are closely related to Sjögren's syndrome: SS-A (Ro) and SS-B (La). Autoantibodies against snRNP are called Anti-Smith antibodies and are specific for SLE. The presence of a significant level of anti-U1-RNP also serves a possible indicator of MCTD when detected in conjunction with several other factors.

=== Functions ===
The ribonucleoproteins play a role of protection. mRNAs never occur as free RNA molecules in the cell. They always associate with ribonucleoproteins and function as ribonucleoprotein complexes.

In the same way, the genomes of negative-strand RNA viruses never exist as free RNA molecule. The ribonucleoproteins protect their genomes from RNase. Nucleoproteins are often the major antigens for viruses because they have strain-specific and group-specific antigenic determinants.

== See also ==
- DNA-binding protein
- RNA-binding protein
