= Wetland virus =

Virus classification
- (unranked): Virus
- Realm: Riboviria
- Kingdom: Orthornavirae
- Phylum: Negarnaviricota
- Class: Bunyaviricetes
- Order: Hareavirales
- Family: Nairoviridae
- Genus: Orthonairovirus
- Virus: Wetland virus

Pathogenic virus

Wetland virus or WELV is a tick borne Orthonairovirus which can infect humans. It can produce fever, headache, dizziness, malaise, arthritis and less commonly petechiae, localized lymphadenopathy. Complications may include neurological symptoms.

== Virology ==
The Wetland virus orthonairovirus (WELV) is a member of the genus Orthonairovirus, family Nairoviridae of RNA viruses. It was first identified in 2019 in a Chinese person in Jinzhou, Liaoning province Northeast China after a visit to a wetland park in Yakeshi, Inner Mongolia. Three different strains were identified one from the patient and two from ticks.

Its sequence is most similar to the Tofla virus from Japan.

== Hosts and transmission ==
The Wetland virus was found in mice, sheep, pigs, cows, and horses, but not dogs. It was found in about 2% of 14,500 different ticks in Northeast China with the highest prevalence (6%) in Haemaphysalis concinna.

== Signs and symptoms ==
Symptoms of infection with the Wetland virus are fever, headache, dizziness, malaise, myalgia (muscle pain), arthritis, and back pain. Less commonly there are petechiae and localized lymphadenopathy. One person also had severe neurological symptoms, but all recovered without sequelae. Symptoms and signs resemble those of Crimean–Congo hemorrhagic fever, and the differential diagnosis includes severe fever with thrombocytopenia syndrome and spotted fever.

== Treatment ==
Nucleoside analogs have been shown to have significant promise in treating WELV virus infections and is in clinical stages.
