= Tofla virus =

Virus classification
- (unranked): Virus
- Realm: Riboviria
- Kingdom: Orthornavirae
- Phylum: Negarnaviricota
- Class: Bunyaviricetes
- Order: Hareavirales
- Family: Nairoviridae
- Genus: Orthonairovirus
- Species: Orthonairovirus japonicum

Species of virus

Tofla virus (Orthonairovirus japonicum) is a species of virus in the genus Orthonairovirus belonging to the Crimean-Congo hemorrhagic fever serogroup. It was isolated in 2016 from Ixodid in Japan.

== See also ==
- Wetland virus
