= Abu Mina virus =

Virus classification
- (unranked): Virus
- Realm: Riboviria
- Kingdom: Orthornavirae
- Phylum: Negarnaviricota
- Class: Bunyaviricetes
- Order: Hareavirales
- Family: Nairoviridae
- Genus: Orthonairovirus
- Species: Orthonairovirus abuminaense

Synonyms
- Abu Mina orthonairovirus

Strain of virus

Abu Mina virus (ABMV), is a species of virus in the genus Orthonairovirus. This virus has not been reported to cause disease in humans.
