= Kasokero virus =

Virus classification
- (unranked): Virus
- Realm: Riboviria
- Kingdom: Orthornavirae
- Phylum: Negarnaviricota
- Class: Bunyaviricetes
- Order: Hareavirales
- Family: Nairoviridae
- Genus: Orthonairovirus
- Species: Orthonairovirus kasokeroense

Synonyms
- Kasokero orthonairovirus

Virus in the genus Orthonairovirus

Kasokero virus (Orthonairovirus kasokeroense) is a species of virus in the genus Orthonairovirus. The virus was first isolated in 1977 at the Uganda Virus Research Institute from serum samples collected from Egyptian fruit bats (Rousettus aegyptiacus) captured at Kasokero Cave in Uganda.

== Virology ==
As a typical member of the Nairoviridae family, Kasokero virus is a negative sense, single-stranded RNA virus with a genome divided into three segments: large (encoding the RNA dependent RNA polymerase), medium (encoding glycoproteins Gn and Gc) and small (encoding the nucleocapsid protein).

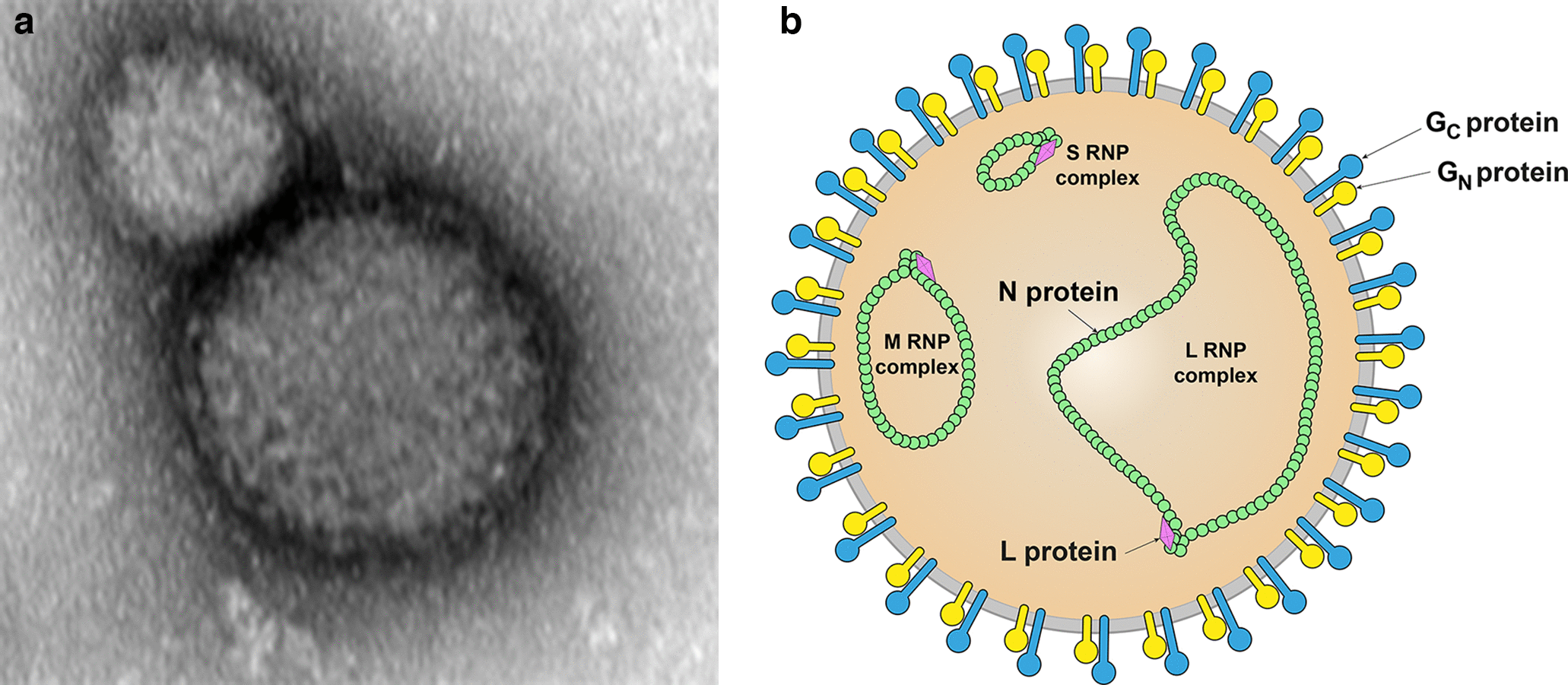
Typical virion structure and genome of members of the Orthonairoviridae family.

== Ecology ==
Kasokero virus was first isolated from serum samples collected from Egyptian fruit bats, known natural reservoirs of the human-pathogenic Marburg virus (Orthomarburgvirus marburgense). In addition, the virus has also been isolated from soft argasid ticks (Ornithodorus faini), observed to feed on fruit bats and considered part of the enzootic transmission cycle of Kasokero virus.

To date, Egyptian fruit bats are the only known vertebrate hosts of Kasokero virus on the African continent. Ecological surveys of wild-caught bats in Uganda have detected that, on average, about 3% of these bats are positive for Kasokero RNA. Experimental infections of Egyptian fruit bats with Kasokero virus have shown that infected bats don't develop overt signs of disease despite detectable virus replication in various tissues.

== Human disease ==
Shortly after its discovery in 1977, Kasokero virus caused laboratory-acquired infections among three laboratory staff members at the Uganda Virus Research Institute. A fourth case was later also detected in a driver who had reported no direct contact with lab staff or facilities. Among the four cases, clinical signs of disease ranged from mild febrile illness to prolonged systemic disease involving fever, headaches, arthralgia, stomach pain, nausea, diarrhoea, chest pain and coughing.
