= Yezo virus =

Virus classification
- (unranked): Virus
- Realm: Riboviria
- Kingdom: Orthornavirae
- Phylum: Negarnaviricota
- Class: Bunyaviricetes
- Order: Hareavirales
- Family: Nairoviridae
- Genus: Orthonairovirus
- Species: Orthonairovirus yezoense

Species of virus

Yezo virus (Orthonairovirus yezoense) is a species of virus in the genus Orthonairovirus, discovered 2021 in Japan, circulating in mammals and ticks, causing a mild febrile illness in humans.

== Virology ==
Yezo virus is classified into the genus Orthonairovirus and is phylogenetically grouped with Sulina virus.

== Natural reservoir ==
As of 2021, Yezo virus was found in wild deer, raccoons, and ticks from Hokkaido, the northernmost island in Japan. They were not found in Hokkaido raccoon dogs (Nyctereutes procyonoides albus) or rodents (Myodes rufocanus bedfordiae and Apodemus speciosus).

Among the three major tick species in Hokkaido (Haemaphysalis megaspinosa, Ixodes ovatus, and Ixodes persulcatus) Yezo virus was most commonly detected in H. megaspinosa. It is suspected to circulate in Ixodes ticks as well, so the geographical range may extend much further into Asia and Europe.

In 2024, Yezo virus was also found in 0.5% of Ixodes persulcatus ticks in Inner Mongolia, Heilongjiang, and Jilin in Northeastern China.

== Human infection, symptoms and signs ==
In 2019 and 2020 two people in Hokkaido, Japan had an acute febrile illness with thrombocytopenia and leukopenia, lymphocytopenia, coagulation disorder, and increased levels of liver enzymes after a tick bite. As of 2021, it was the first orthonairovirus associated disease in Japan. In retrospective screening, 7 out of 248 persons suspected as having a tick-borne disease were found to have evidence of Yezo virus infection.

In 2024, a younger person from China without underlying disease was described with a mild form of infection with light headache, dizziness, blurred vision, shortness of breath, fatigue, and arthralgia. All persons in the two countries recovered completely.
