= Puffin Island virus =

Virus classification
- (unranked): Virus
- Realm: Riboviria
- Kingdom: Orthornavirae
- Phylum: Negarnaviricota
- Class: Bunyaviricetes
- Order: Hareavirales
- Family: Nairoviridae
- Genus: Orthonairovirus
- Species: Dugbe orthonairovirus
- Virus: Puffin Island virus

Virus in the genus Orthonairovirus

Puffin Island virus, is a strain of Dugbe orthonairovirus belonging to the Hughes serogroup.
