= Yogue virus =

Virus classification
- (unranked): Virus
- Realm: Riboviria
- Kingdom: Orthornavirae
- Phylum: Negarnaviricota
- Class: Bunyaviricetes
- Order: Hareavirales
- Family: Nairoviridae
- Genus: Orthonairovirus
- Species: Orthonairovirus yogueense

Synonyms
- Yogue orthonairovirus

Species of virus

Yogue virus (Orthonairovirus yogueense) is a species of virus in the genus Orthonairovirus. Its only known host is Rousettus aegyptiacus.
