= Abu Hammad virus =

Virus classification
- (unranked): Virus
- Realm: Riboviria
- Kingdom: Orthornavirae
- Phylum: Negarnaviricota
- Class: Bunyaviricetes
- Order: Hareavirales
- Family: Nairoviridae
- Genus: Orthonairovirus
- Species: Orthonairovirus abuhammadense

Synonyms
- Abu Hammad orthonairovirus

Species of virus

Abu Hammad virus (AHV), is a species of virus in the genus Orthonairovirus. It was isolated from a tick, Argas hermanni, in Egypt. This virus doesn't cause disease in humans.

Abu Hammad virus shares an intergroup relationship with viruses of serogroups (CHF-CON, HUG, NSD, QYB, and SAK), all of which make up the Nairovirus genus.
