= Farallon virus =

Virus classification
- (unranked): Virus
- Realm: Riboviria
- Kingdom: Orthornavirae
- Phylum: Negarnaviricota
- Class: Bunyaviricetes
- Order: Hareavirales
- Family: Nairoviridae
- Genus: Orthonairovirus
- Species: Orthonairovirus bushkeyense

Synonyms
- Hughes nairovirus; Hughes orthonairovirus; Hughes virus

Species of virus

Farallon virus (Orthonairovirus bushkeyense) is species of virus in the genus Orthonairovirus belonging to the Hughes serogroup. A known host of the virus is Ornithodoros. The virus is named after the Farallon Islands.
