= Coxal gland =

Gland found in some arthropods

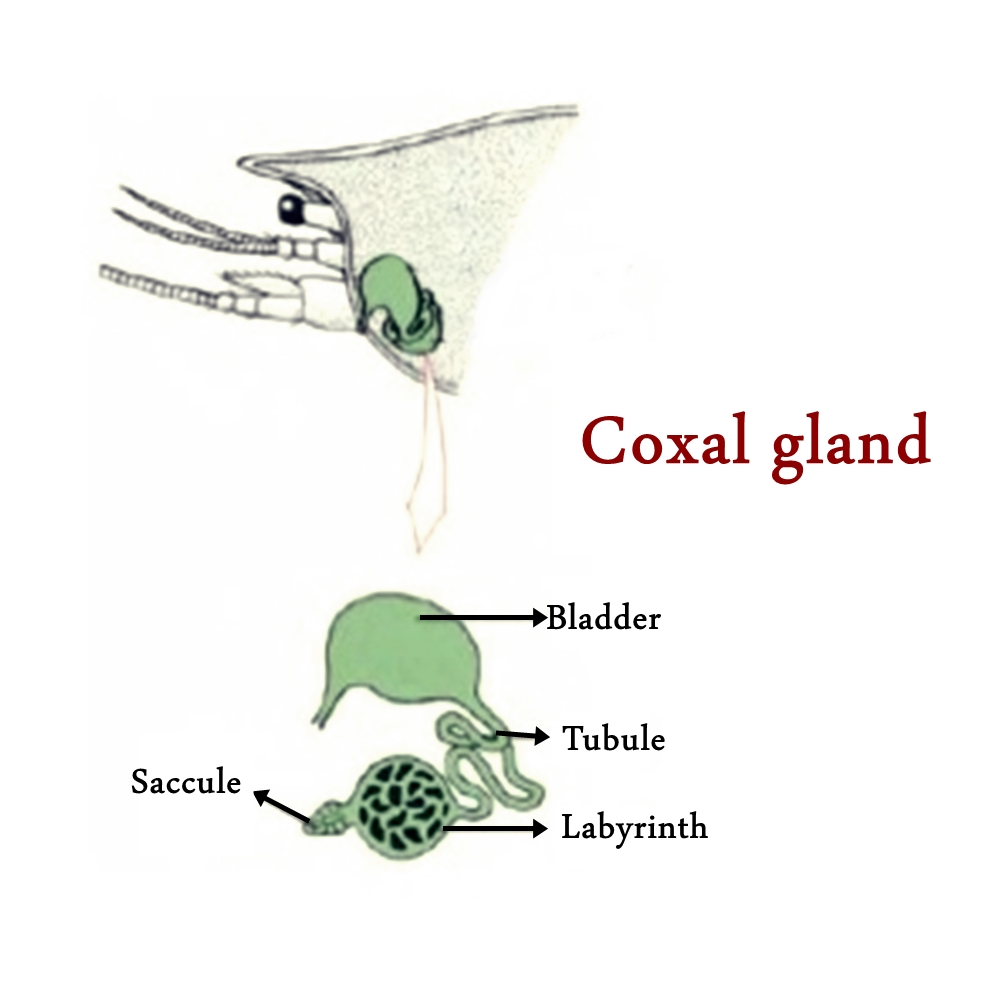
Coxal gland and its components

The coxal gland is a gland found in some arthropods, for collecting and excreting urine. They are found in all arachnids (with the exception of some Acari), and in other chelicerates, such as horseshoe crabs. The coxal gland is thought to be homologous with the antennal gland of crustaceans. The gland consists of an end sac (saccule), a long duct (labyrinth) and a terminal bladder (reservoir). There is generally only one pair (two in some spiders), and they open on the coxae of the walking legs or at the base of the second antennae in the case of the crustacean antennal gland. The coxal secretion of adult female ticks of Ornithodoros erraticus contains a sex pheromone. In Spiders, the coxal glands should not be confused with segmentary organs, a whole set of even and symmetrical exocrine structures, apparently metamerized, located in the prosoma of spiders on the base of the appendages, the most important being the retrognathocoxal glands. They were discovered microscopically and named by André Lopez for the first time in Metepeira and later on in other genera (1978,1983,1984)(external link "archentoflor")

== Excretory system ==
The excretory system of the prawn lacks a true kidney. The following parts are found in its excretory system:

- Antennal or green glands: A pair of enteric glands are found in the coxa (Grap) of each antenna. They are green in color, hence the name "green gland." The antennal gland consists of four regions:
  - End sac: This is the smallest part which is bean-shaped. It is located between the bladder and the labrum. Inside it is a large blood-facuna. It has two levels in the wall. Its walls have numerous blood vessels which are the outer layer, the inner layer is thin and contains large excretory epithelial cells. The end sac functions similarly to the vertebrate glomerular nephron.
  - Labyrinth: The labyrinth is highly coiled and is made up of branched excretory tubules. Blood vessels are found in the connective tissue mass. These ducts have a large excretory system which are covered by a single layer of cells. The labyrinth is involved with the movement of ions and reabsorption of proteins.
  - Bladder: This is the inner side of the last cell and is the largest part. It is made up of a single layer of excretory epithelium. Its inner wall emerges to form a small ureter or ureter. The ureter is enclosed outside by a round renal aperture, which is located on the inner surface of the coxa of the antennae on top of a papilla. The bladder stores urine. A ureter connects the bladder to the nephropore (excretory pore) under the base of the second antennae.
  - Lateral ducts: A narrow lateral duct emerges from the bladder of each hyaline gland at the back. The lateral vessels on either side are joined by a transverse connective in front of the brain. After this, moving backward along both the esophagus opens into the renal sac.

== Communication ==
In invertebrates with coxal glands, many forms of communication are conveyed via chemicals in the urine. Several studies have shown that in crayfish, these chemicals convey information such as reproductive capability, the identity of individual crayfish, as well as their aggression levels and hierarchical status. For example, when two male crayfish meet, they will engage in combat. Combat determines which individual is "dominant" or "submissive" in the hierarchy. These encounters affect their aggression levels, regulated by serotonin, and thus changes the chemical composition of their urine . The chemical changes undergone will mediate further encounters, as they will offer crayfish a certain level of "familiarity" with each other. The chemicals in their urine communicate their rank to other crayfish and while the intensity of the encounter remains the same, the length of the encounter will be much shorter.

=== Communication interference ===
Foreign chemicals introduced into the ecosystem have the potential to interfere with the arthropod's chemical receptors. Insecticide run-off from agricultural applications has been shown to inhibit communication in crayfish. Neonicotinoids are widely used systemic insecticides that act as a neurotoxin to most arthropods that are water soluble and frequently make it into various waterways. Neonicotinoids bind to nicotinic acetylcholine receptors (nAChR), which kills insects by overstimulating them. nAChRs can be found in the interneurons of the brain, neuromuscular junctions, and the olfactory bulb. Neonicotinoids binding to these receptors prevents the chemicals involved in communication from binding to their proper receptors. As a result, crayfish exposed to these insecticides at sublethal doses lose their ability to detect certain cues. Crayfish will fail to recognize individuals that they have had previous encounters with, as well as their hierarchical status. Crayfish also will fail to find food, and lab experiments show that they display no preference for environments with or without food.
