= Artashat (disambiguation) =

Artaxata, also known as Artashat, is an ancient city and one of the historic capitals of Armenia.

Artashat may also refer to:

- Artashat, Armenia, a modern town in Armenia named after the nearby ancient city of Artashat
- Artashat orthonairovirus, a virus
- Verin Artashat, a village in the Ararat Province of Armenia
- Artashat City Stadium, a football stadium in the town of Artashat
