= BDAV =

BDAV could mean:

- Blu-ray Disc Audio-Visual MPEG-2 Transport Stream or .m2ts
- Bandia virus, a strain of Qalyub orthonairovirus
- Building Designers Association of Victoria
