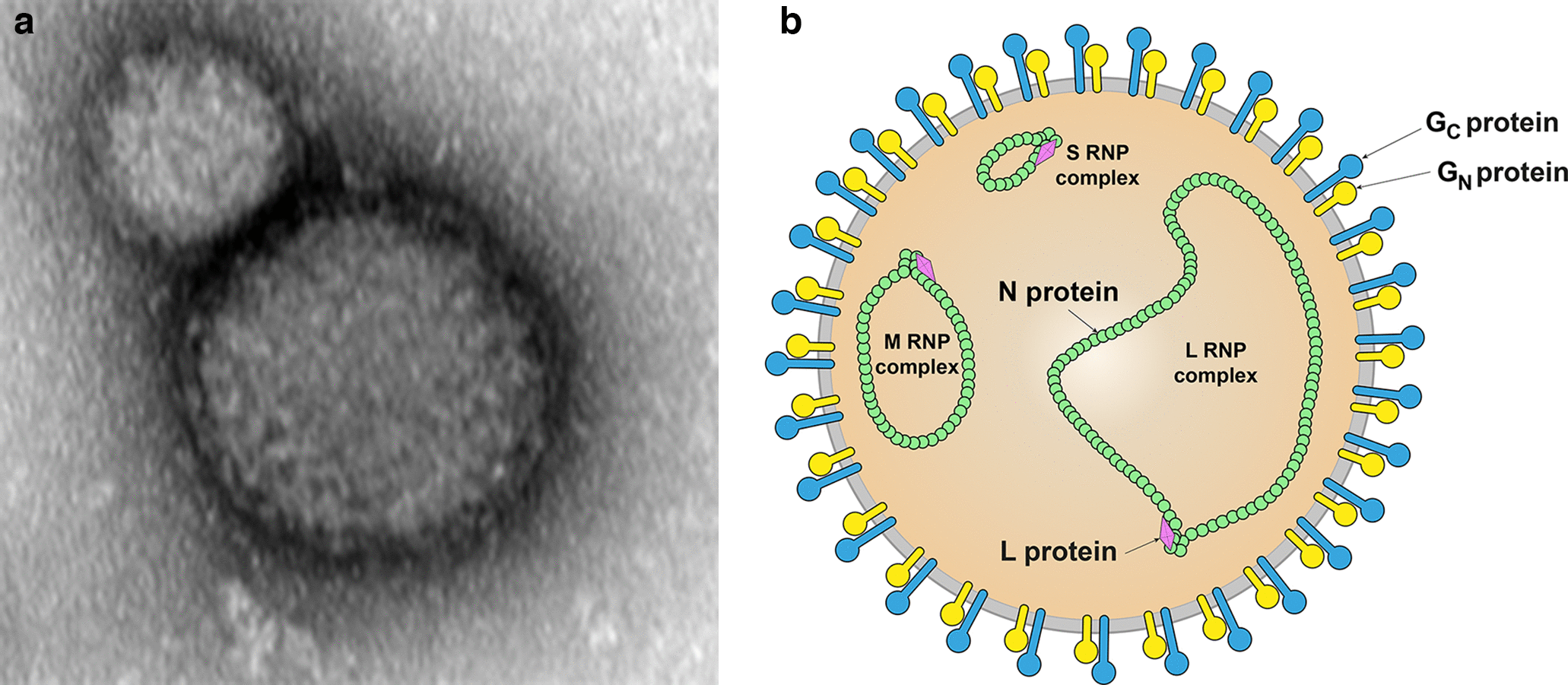

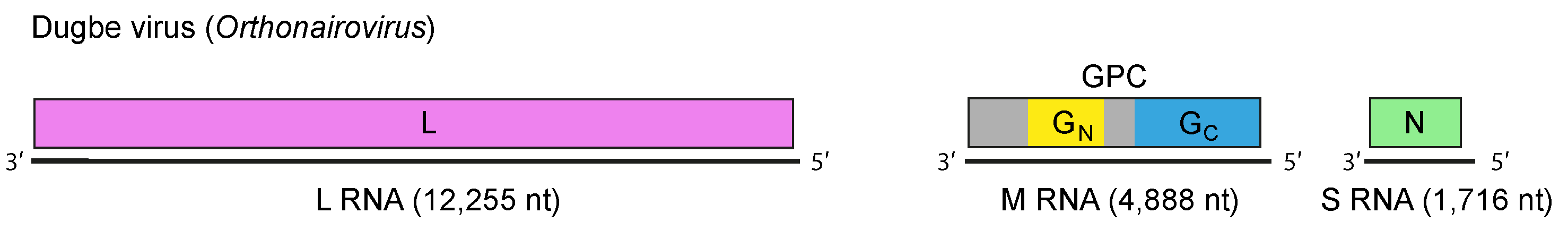
- Crimean-Congo hemorrhagic fever virus virion and genome

Virus classification
- (unranked): Virus
- Realm: Riboviria
- Kingdom: Orthornavirae
- Phylum: Negarnaviricota
- Class: Bunyaviricetes
- Order: Hareavirales
- Family: Nairoviridae
- Genus: Orthonairovirus

= Orthonairovirus =

Genus of viruses

Orthonairovirus is a genus of viruses in the family Nairoviridae of the order Hareavirales which includes viruses with circular, negative-sense single stranded RNA. The name is derived from the Nairobi sheep disease which affects the gastrointestinal tracts of sheep and goats. All viruses in this genus are tick-borne viruses with human or other vertebrate hosts.

== Structure ==
The virions for viruses in this genus have a spherical shape. They range in size from about 80–120 nm in diameter, with 50% of their weight attributed to proteins and 20–30% of their weight attributed to lipids. The ribonucleocapsid is filamentous, having a length of about 200-300 nm and a width of about 2–2.5 nm. These nucleocapsids are surrounded by a single envelope that has projections made of glycoproteins protruding from its surface. These projections evenly cover the surface of the virion, and are about 5–10 nm long. They aid in attachment to the host receptor in replication.

== Genome ==
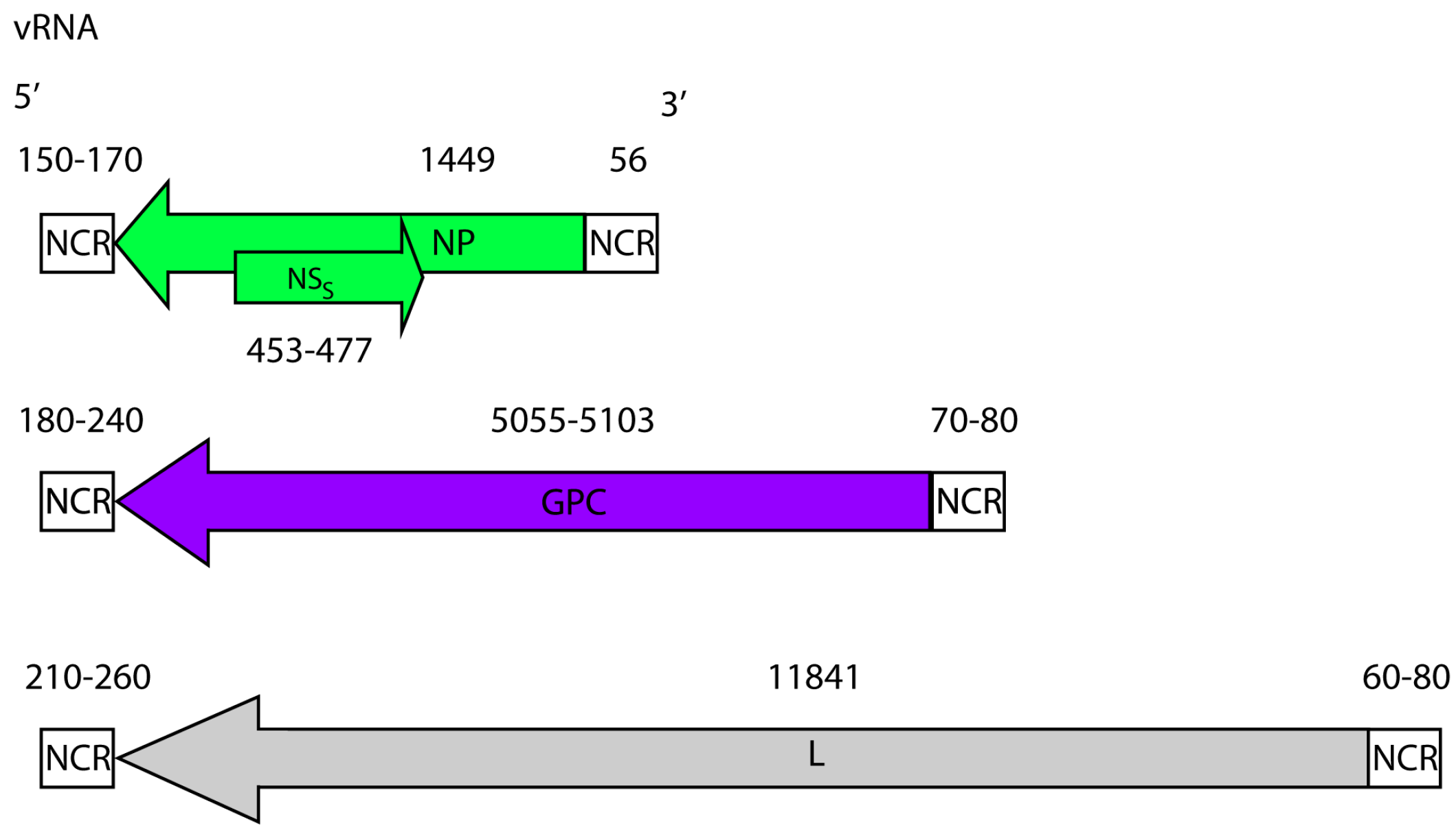
Crimean-Congo hemorrhagic fever virus genome

Nairovirus genomes are negative sense, single-stranded RNA. The complete genome is about 17,100–22,800 nucleotides long, and is divided into three segments: large, medium, and small. The large segment is about 11000–14400 nucleotides long (11–14.4 kb), and it encodes the viral polymerase. The medium segment is about 4,400–6,300 nucleotides long (4.4–6.3 kb), and it encodes for glycoproteins G¬n and Gc. The small segment is about 1,700–2,100 nucleotides long (1.7–2.1 kb), and it encodes the nucleocapsid protein.

The genome has terminally redundant sequences, with the sequences being repeated at both ends. The terminal nucleotides are base-paired forming, non-covalently closed, circular RNA. Both the 5’ and 3’ ends have conserved regions, 9 nucleotides in length. The sequences are, 5’end: UCUCAAAGA, and 3’end: AGAGUUUCU.

== Replication ==
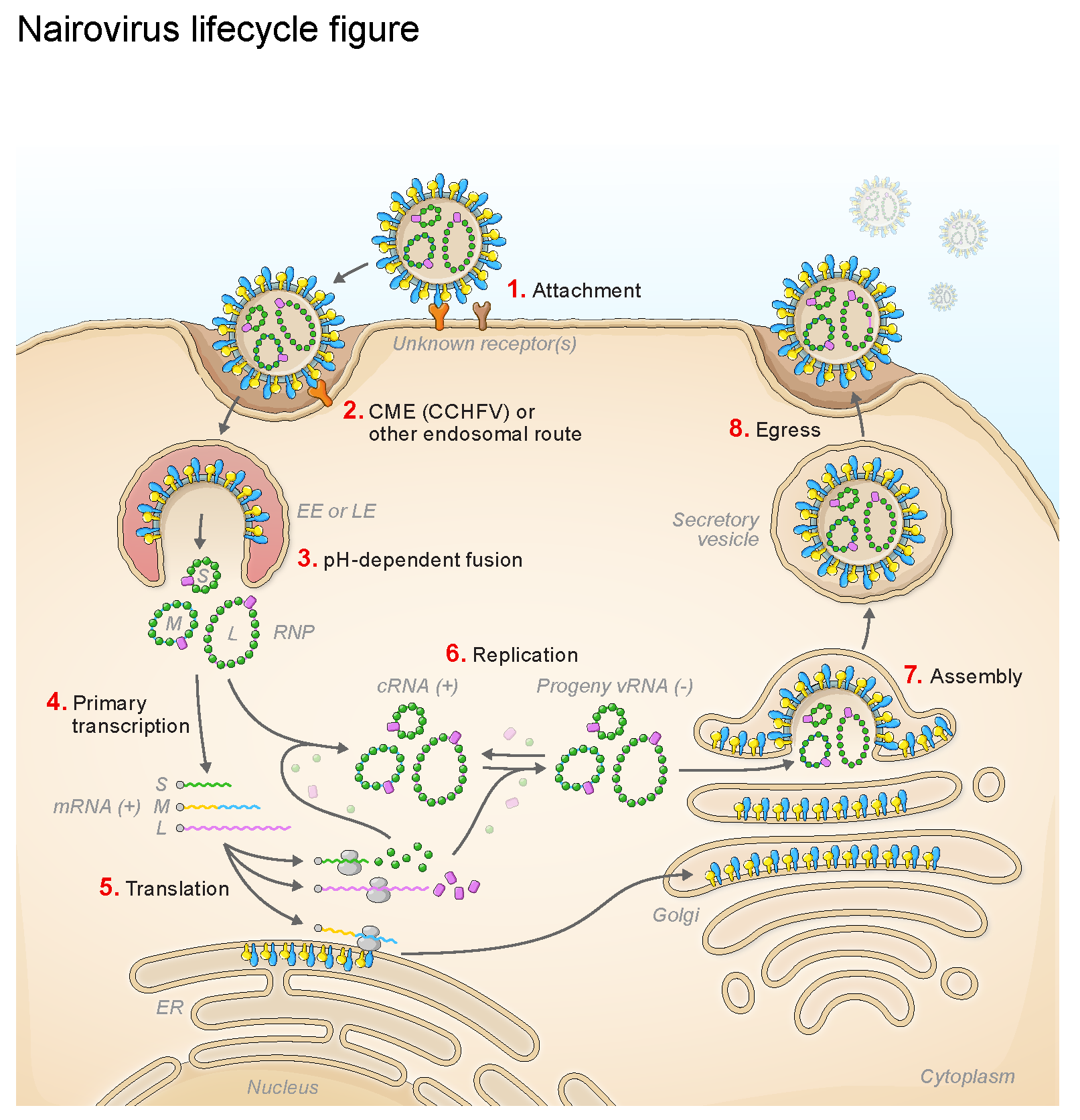
Nairovirus life cycle

Nairoviruses attach to the host receptor by their Gn-Gc glycoprotein dimer. The virus is then endocytosed into the host cell via a vesicle. The ribonucleocapsid segments are released into the cytoplasm, commencing transcription. Transcription and replication occur within the cell, and the newly synthesized virions are released by budding.

== Transmission and distribution ==
Members of this viral genus infect many different vertebrate hosts, and are transmitted via ticks.

Members of the genus Nairovirus may be found the world over, wherever their arthropod vectors and vertebrate hosts are found together.

== Taxonomy ==
The genus contains the following species, listed by scientific name and followed by the exemplar virus of the species:

- Orthonairovirus abuhammadense, Abū Ḥammād virus
- Orthonairovirus abuminaense, Abū Mīnā virus
- Orthonairovirus amblyommae, Kupe virus
- Orthonairovirus antuense, Antú virus
- Orthonairovirus artashatense, Artashat virus
- Orthonairovirus australiaense, Vinegar Hill virus
- Orthonairovirus avalonense, Avalon virus
- Orthonairovirus bandiaense, Bandia virus
- Orthonairovirus buranaense, Burana virus
- Orthonairovirus bushkeyense, Farallon virus
- Orthonairovirus chimense, Chim virus
- Orthonairovirus clomorense, Clo Mor virus
- Orthonairovirus crocidurae, Wufeng Crocidura attenuata orthonairovirus 1
- Orthonairovirus dermacentoris, Pacific Coast tick nairovirus
- Orthonairovirus dugbeense, Dugbe virus
- Orthonairovirus erveense, Erve virus
- Orthonairovirus esteroense, Estero Real virus
- Orthonairovirus gossasense, Gossas virus
- Orthonairovirus gubboense, Gubbo nairovirus
- Orthonairovirus haemorrhagiae, Crimean-Congo hemorrhagic fever virus
- Orthonairovirus hazaraense, Hazara virus
- Orthonairovirus huangpiense, Huángpí tick virus 1
- Orthonairovirus issykkulense, Issyk-kul virus
- Orthonairovirus japonicum, Tofla virus
- Orthonairovirus kasokeroense, Kasokero virus
- Orthonairovirus keterehense, Keterah virus
- Orthonairovirus khani, Dera Ghazi Khan virus
- Orthonairovirus lambarenense, Lamusara virus
- Orthonairovirus lusakaense, Leopards Hill virus
- Orthonairovirus macquariense, Taggert virus
- Orthonairovirus manidae, Pangolin orthonairovirus
- Orthonairovirus meihuashanense, Méihua Mountain virus
- Orthonairovirus meramense, Meram virus
- Orthonairovirus nairobiense, Nairobi sheep disease virus
- Orthonairovirus parahaemorrhagiae, Aigai virus
- Orthonairovirus peruense, Punta Salinas virus
- Orthonairovirus qalyubense, Qalyub virus
- Orthonairovirus randallense, Sapphire II virus
- Orthonairovirus sakhalinense, Sakhalin virus
- Orthonairovirus sinense, Orthonairovirus sp. strain YS
- Orthonairovirus soldadoense, Soldado virus
- Orthonairovirus songlingense, Sōnglǐng virus
- Orthonairovirus sulinaense, Sulina virus
- Orthonairovirus sunci, Cencurut virus
- Orthonairovirus tachengense, Tǎchéng tick virus 1
- Orthonairovirus thiaforaense, Thiafora virus
- Orthonairovirus tomdiense, Tamdy virus
- Orthonairovirus tunisense, Tunis virus
- Orthonairovirus wenzhouense, Wēnzhōu tick virus
- Orthonairovirus yezoense, Yezo virus
- Orthonairovirus yogueense, Yogue virus
- Orthonairovirus zirkuense, Zirqa virus

== Clinical importance ==
Members of this viral genus which infect humans include Crimean–Congo hemorrhagic fever, Dugbe virus, Nairobi sheep disease virus, Songling virus, Yezo virus, Tacheng tick virus, Beiji orthonairovirus and Wetland virus. Except for the first they cause relatively mild disease.

Kasokero virus and Erve virus are likely also pathogenic for humans.

== Evolution ==
Phylogenetic analysis has shown that these viruses fall into two major monophyletic groups, the hard (Ixodidae) and soft (Argasidae) tick-vectored groups. Fossil and phylogenetic data places the hard tick-soft tick divergence between 120 million years ago and 92 million years ago. This suggests that the Nairoviruses have been associated with these ticks for over 100 million years.

Additionally, nairoviruses vectored by ticks of the genera Argas, Carios and Ornithodoros form three separate monophyletic lineages, again supporting the suggestion of host-virus cospeciation.

The hard bodied tick serogroups are

- Crimean-Congo hemorrhagic fever
- Nairobi sheep disease
- Sakhalin
- Tamdy

The soft bodied tick serogroups are

- Hughes
- Dera Ghazi Khan
- Qalyub

The tick vectors for the Kasokero and Thiafora serogroups are not currently known.

== See also ==
- Farallon virus
- Puffin Island virus
- Wetland virus
