= OMOV =

OMOV could mean:

- One man, one vote, as a pro-democracy slogan
- One member, one vote, in Commonwealth parliamentary systems
- Omo virus (OMOV), a strain of Qalyub orthonairovirus
