= Artashat virus =

Virus classification
- (unranked): Virus
- Realm: Riboviria
- Kingdom: Orthornavirae
- Phylum: Negarnaviricota
- Class: Bunyaviricetes
- Order: Hareavirales
- Family: Nairoviridae
- Genus: Orthonairovirus
- Species: Orthonairovirus artashatense

Synonyms
- Artashat orthonairovirus

Species of virus

Artashat virus (ARTSV), is a species in the genus Orthonairovirus. It was first isolated in Armenia in 1972 from Ornithodoros alactagalis, a soft tick of the family Argasidae.
