= Nairobi sheep disease virus =

Virus classification
- (unranked): Virus
- Realm: Riboviria
- Kingdom: Orthornavirae
- Phylum: Negarnaviricota
- Class: Bunyaviricetes
- Order: Hareavirales
- Family: Nairoviridae
- Genus: Orthonairovirus
- Species: Orthonairovirus nairobiense

Synonyms
- Ganjam virus; Nairobi sheep disease orthonairovirus

Species of virus

Nairobi sheep disease virus (NSDV), also known as Ganjam virus, is a species in the genus Orthonairovirus belonging to the Nairobi sheep disease serogroup. NSDV's known hosts belong to the hard tick family Ixodidae, including Rhipicephalus appendiculatus, and Amblyomma variegatum, and afflict sheep and goats naturally. The virus is in the family Nairoviridae and order Bunyavirales.

== Symptoms ==
Symptoms of an animal infected with NSDV may include fever, reduction in white blood cells, rapid respiration, anorexia, profound depression, diarrhea, drop in body temperature, premature abortion, and eventually death.

== History ==
NSDV was first recognised in 1917 as the causative agent of a disease that was affecting sheep transported from the Maasai region of Kenya for sale in the Nairobi livestock markets, where a 70% mortality rate was recorded for local breeds sheep, but a lower rate for European breeds. Another mortality rate of 90% has been reported, affecting highly susceptible populations.

== Species affected ==
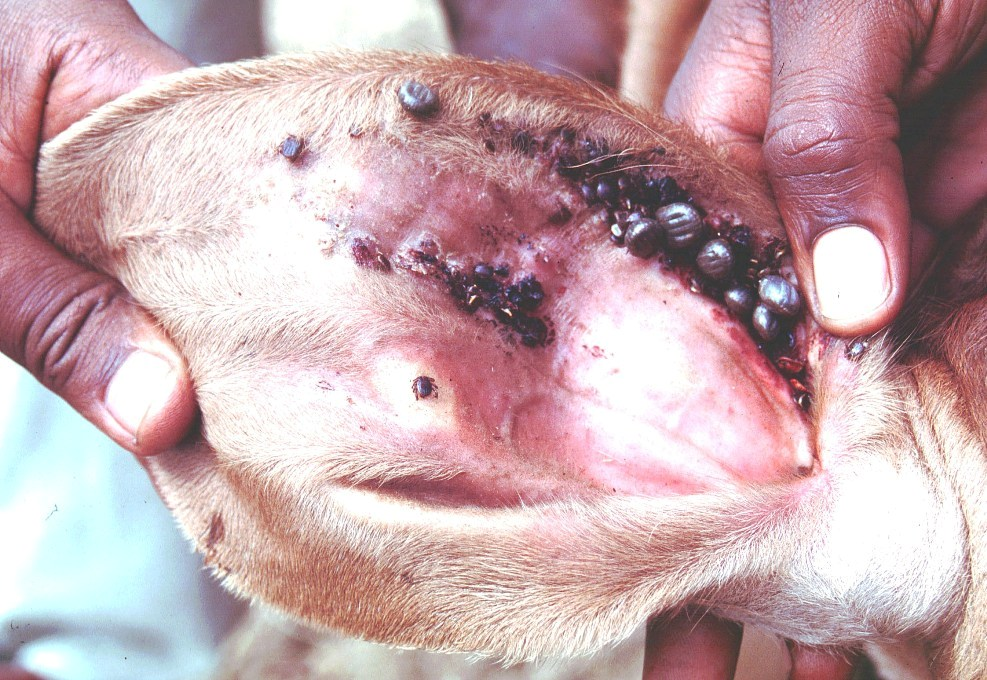
The vector Rhipicephalus appendiculatus feeding on a calf's ear

Sheep and goats are natural reservoirs for NSDV and Ganjam, but fatal cases have also been reported among blue duikers in zoos or in the wild. High morbidity and mortality are seen in both sheep and goats, although goats tend to have less severe clinical signs than sheep. African field rats, langur monkeys and Bonnet macaques have been experimentally inoculated with NSDV and Ganjam virus, with the macaques not becoming viremic as result.

== Genome ==
The genome is composed a single strand of negative sense RNA in three parts—small (S), medium (M) and large (L).
