= Viral nucleoprotein =

Class of RNA-binding proteins found in viruses

In virology, viral nucleoproteins (NPs) are essential RNA-binding proteins encoded by many viruses, especially negative-sense single-stranded RNA (–ssRNA) viruses. They play crucial roles in encapsulating viral RNA, facilitating genome replication and transcription, organizing viral ribonucleoprotein (vRNP) complexes, and evading host immunity.

== Structure and function ==
Key functions of viral NPs include:

- RNA Encapsulation: NPs coat the viral genome in a sequence-independent manner, protecting it from nucleases and host pattern recognition receptors such as RIG-I and MDA5.
- RNP Assembly: NP-RNA complexes serve as templates for viral RNA synthesis by the RNA-dependent RNA polymerase (RdRp).
- Regulation of Replication: NP levels help determine the balance between transcription and genome replication.
- Virion Assembly: NP interacts with matrix proteins and other structural elements during packaging into virions.

== Examples by virus family ==
=== Orthomyxoviridae (e.g., Influenza Virus) ===
Influenza A virus NP (~56 kDa) encapsulates the segmented viral RNA genome into helical RNPs alongside the viral polymerase complex (PA, PB1, PB2). These RNPs are transported into the host nucleus, where viral replication and transcription take place. NP mediates nuclear trafficking via interactions with importins and CRM1. It also undergoes post-translational modifications such as SUMOylation that modulate its function.

=== Arenaviridae (e.g., Lassa Virus, LCMV) ===
Mammarenaviruses, including Lassa virus and LCMV, encode a multifunctional NP that plays central roles in genome encapsidation, replication, and immune evasion. NP interacts with the matrix Z protein, and recent research showed that Z protein myristoylation and oligomerization are not required for its dose-dependent inhibition of NP-RNP activity.

Notably, mammarenavirus NP also exploits the host protein kinase R (PKR) pathway, usually antiviral, to support viral replication; PKR activation appears to promote viral growth. The arenaviral nucleoprotein contains a C-terminal exonuclease domain (ExoN) that degrades immunostimulatory double-stranded RNA (dsRNA), helping the virus evade RIG-I-mediated interferon responses.

Structural studies reveal NP forms heptameric ring-like oligomers, a unique arrangement necessary for stable RNA binding and polymerase recruitment. Furthermore, phosphorylation of specific NP residues has been shown to affect replication complex assembly and RNA synthesis efficiency.

=== Filoviridae (e.g., Ebola Virus) ===
Ebola virus NP oligomerizes on the viral RNA to form a tightly coiled nucleocapsid, recruiting VP35, VP30, and L polymerase to constitute the replication complex. These complexes are organized into inclusion bodies within the cytoplasm and are essential for viral transcription.

=== Paramyxoviridae (e.g., Measles Virus) ===
Measles virus NP binds the viral genome with six-nucleotide periodicity to form left-handed helical nucleocapsids. NP interacts with phosphoprotein (P) and polymerase (L) to regulate transcription and replication.

== Host interaction and immune evasion ==
NPs have evolved to manipulate host antiviral defenses:

- Interferon Antagonism: Influenza A NP can bind TRIM25 and suppress RIG-I activation, reducing type I interferon production.
- Stress Granule Disruption: SARS-CoV-2 NP interferes with stress granule assembly by interacting with G3BP1, impairing cellular antiviral responses.
- PKR Modulation: In mammarenaviruses, NP indirectly leverages PKR signaling to enhance viral replication, representing a rare case of pro-viral PKR activation.

== Structural insights ==
Structural biology has provided important insights into NP function:

- Influenza NP forms a crescent-shaped structure that oligomerizes via a tail-loop insertion mechanism to encapsidate RNA.
- Arenavirus and filovirus NPs assemble into ring-like or helical structures that facilitate cooperative RNA binding and efficient polymerase activity.
- SARS-CoV-2 NP contains both a structured RNA-binding domain and disordered regions that promote liquid–liquid phase separation, supporting replication compartment formation.

== Diagnostic and therapeutic applications ==
NPs are useful in diagnostics and immunization:

- Diagnostics: Due to their abundance and immunogenicity, NPs are widely used in antigen and antibody tests (e.g., SARS-CoV-2, influenza).
- Vaccines: NP-based vaccines elicit robust T cell responses, and influenza vaccines incorporating NP can offer broad cross-strain protection.
