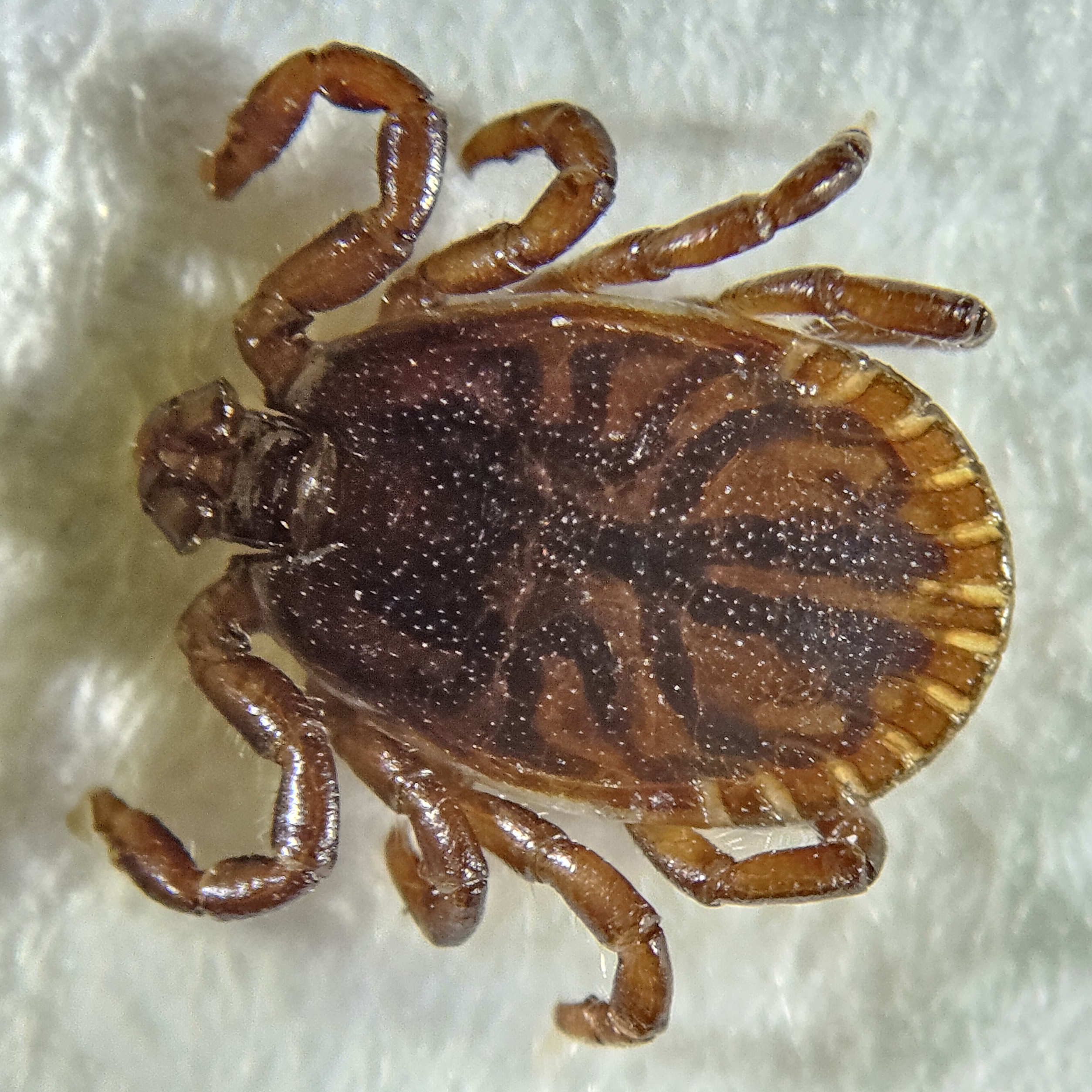

Scientific classification
- Kingdom: Animalia
- Phylum: Arthropoda
- Subphylum: Chelicerata
- Class: Arachnida
- Order: Ixodida
- Family: Ixodidae
- Genus: Haemaphysalis
- Species: H. concinna

Binomial name
- Haemaphysalis concinna C. L. Koch, 1844

= Haemaphysalis concinna =

Species of tick

Haemaphysalis concinna is a common rodent tick species that originally predominantly occurred in Russia and Eastern Europe, but is also known from Japan, China, Germany, and France. It is known to act as a vector of tickborne disease.

== Description ==
Females reach a length of 3-4 mm, but can grow up to 10 mm when engorged; males are about 3 mm long. An unfed nymph is under 2 mm long. Males exceed females in number.

== Distribution, ecology ==
The tick can be found in the warm, temperate climate zone of deciduous and mixed forests across Europe and Asia. It prefers moist habitats lake shores or river banks. In China, it has been found in northeastern regions including Liaoning, Jilin, Heilongjiang, and Inner Mongolia.

== Physiology ==
All three stages target different hosts, the eggs are laid on the ground. They mate on their host around April. Nymphs and larvae feed on small mammals such as rodents or hedgehogs, or on birds, reptiles, and humans. Adults prefer larger mammals, ranging from cats to horses, again including humans.

== Diseases ==
H. concinna can act as a vector for Francisella tularensis (causing tularaemia), Rickettsia sibirica (Siberian tick typhus), Rickettsia heilongjiangensis (Far Eastern spotted fever), virus of Russian spring-summer encephalitis (RSSE), and tick-borne encephalitis (TBE). It is a likely vector of wetland virus.
