= Qalyub virus =

Virus classification
- (unranked): Virus
- Realm: Riboviria
- Kingdom: Orthornavirae
- Phylum: Negarnaviricota
- Class: Bunyaviricetes
- Order: Hareavirales
- Family: Nairoviridae
- Genus: Orthonairovirus
- Species: Orthonairovirus qalyubense

Synonyms
- Qalyub orthonairovirus

Species of virus

Qalyub virus (Orthonairovirus qalyubense) is a virus discovered in a rat's nest in a tomb wall in the Egyptian town of Qalyub (Egyptian Arabic: قليوب pronounced [ʔælˈjuːb]) in 1952. The primary vector for transmission is the Carios erraticus tick, and thus it is an arbovirus.

There is no evidence of clinical disease in humans.
