= Ribonucleoprotein particle =

Protein complex

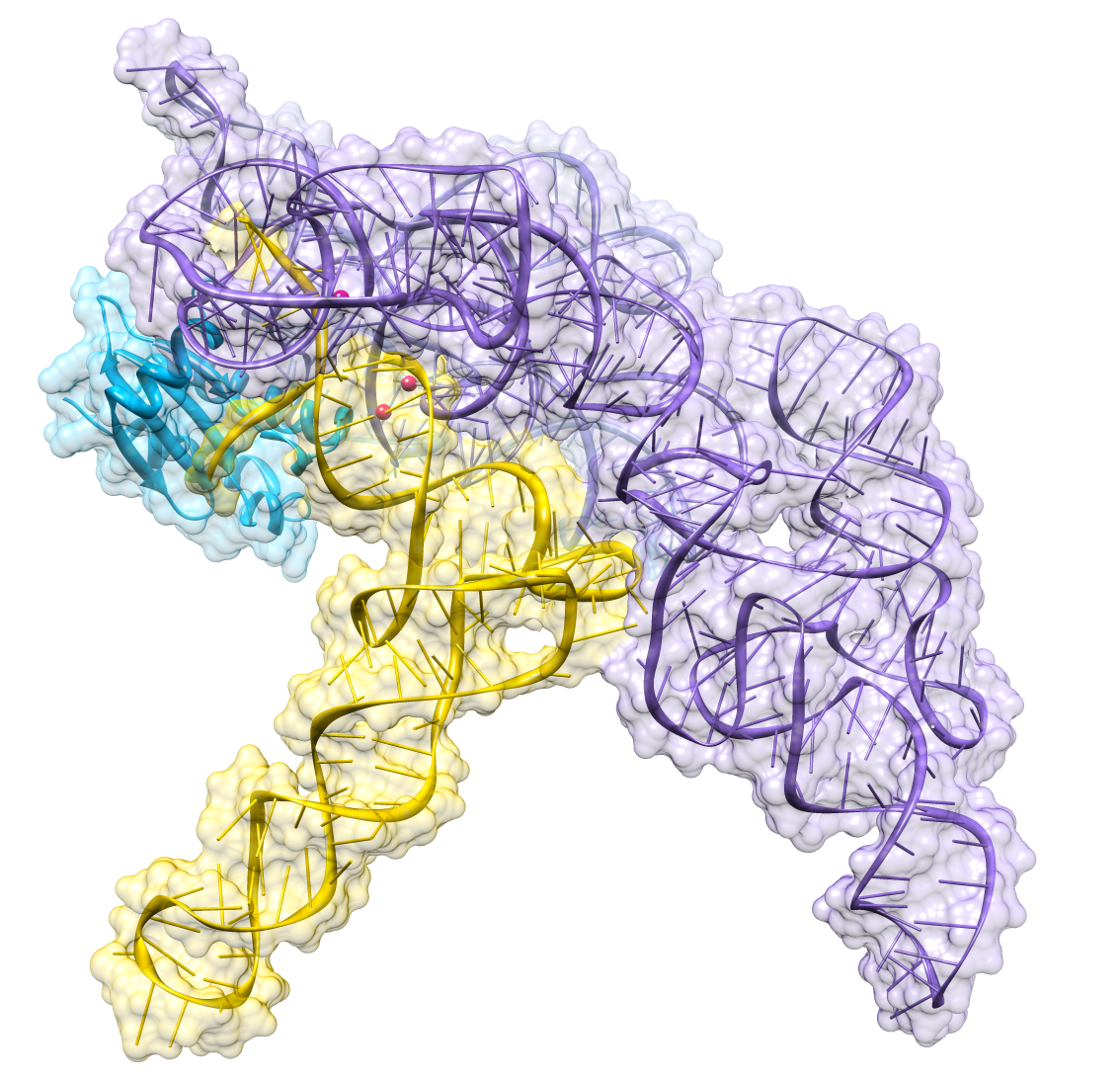
Crystal structure of a bacterial RNP, the ribonuclease P holoenzyme in complex with tRNA (yellow), showing metal ions involved in catalysis (pink spheres), PDB: 3Q1R

A ribonucleoprotein particle (RNP) is a complex formed between RNA and RNA-binding proteins (RBPs). The term RNP foci can also be used to denote intracellular compartments involved in processing of RNA transcripts.

== RNA/RBP complexes ==
RBPs interact with RNA through various structural motifs. Aromatic amino acid residues in RNA-binding proteins result in stacking interactions with RNA. Lysine residues in the helical portion of RNA binding proteins help to stabilize interactions with other nucleic acids as a result of the force of attraction between the positively-charged lysine side chains and the negatively-charged phosphate "backbone" of RNA.

It is hypothesized that RNA sequences in the 3'-untranslated region determine the binding of RBPs, and that these RBPs determine the post-transcriptional fate of mRNAs.

== RNP granules ==
RNP granules are a highly diverse group of compartments. These include stress granules, processing bodies, and exosomes in somatic cells. Many RNP granules are cell type and/or species specific. For example, chromatoid bodies are found only in male germ cells, whereas transport granules have so far been found only in neurons and oocytes. RNP granules function mainly by physically separating or associating transcripts with proteins. They function in the storage, processing, degradation and transportation of their associated transcripts.

RNP granules have been shown to have particular importance in cells where post-transcriptional regulation is of vital importance. For example, in neurons where transcripts must be transported and stored in dendrites for the formation and strengthening of connections, in oocytes/embryos where mRNAs are stored for years before being translated, and in developing sperm cells where transcription is halted before development is complete.

== See also ==
- Messenger RNP, complex between mRNA and protein(s) present in nucleus
- Heterogeneous ribonucleoprotein particle, complexes of RNA and protein present in the cell nucleus
