= Protein-RNA interface database =

PRIDB

Content
- Description: Protein–RNA Interface Database.

Contact
- Research center: Iowa State University
- Authors: Benjamin A Lewis
- Primary citation: Lewis & al. (2011)
- Release date: 2010

Access
- Website: http://bindr.gdcb.iastate.edu/PRIDB.

The Protein–RNA Interface Database (PRIDB) is a database of protein–RNA interfaces extracted from the Protein Data Bank.

== See also ==
- RNA-binding protein
- Protein Data Bank
