= Ornithodoros erraticus =

Scientific classification
- Kingdom: Animalia
- Phylum: Arthropoda
- Subphylum: Chelicerata
- Class: Arachnida
- Order: Ixodida
- Family: Argasidae
- Genus: Ornithodoros
- Species: O. erraticus

Binomial name
- Ornithodoros erraticus (H. Lucas, 1849)

Synonyms
- Argas erraticus H. Lucas, 1849; Ornithodoros erraticus (Lucas, 1849); Neumann, 1896; Alectorobius erraticus (Lucas, 1849) or Alectorobius (Theriodoros) erraticus; per Pospelova-Shtrom, 1953; Carios erraticus (Lucas, 1849); Ornithodoros (Pavlovskyella) erraticus (Lucas, 1849); per Clifford, Kohls, & Sonenshine, 1964; Ornithodoros erraticus subsp. erraticus Bailly-Choumara, Morel, & Rageau, 1976; Heteronyms: Ornithodoros erraticus subsp. major Colas-Belcour & Rageau, 1961; See also potential synonym with: Ornithodorus marocanus Velu, 1919; Ornithodorus erraticus subsp. marocanus Velu, 1919; Dürieux, 1932; Alectorobius marocanus (Velu, 1919); Pospelova-Shtrom, 1953; Argas marocanus Oswald, 1937 (misapplied name per Tickbase); Alectorobius (Theriodoros) marocanus Velu, 1919; Pospelova-Shtrom, 1953

Species of tick

Ornithodoros erraticus is a species of tick in the family Argasidae. The tick was described by Hippolyte Lucas in 1849 as Argas erraticus from individuals collected in northern Algeria.

== Description ==
The tick is native to the Middle East and Mediterranean. It is one of the more common soft ticks to bite humans. Their main food sources in Spain are pigs; the tick has been found in pig pens in the provinces of Salamanca, Badajoz, and Huelva. The only human habitats the tick can enter are places in poor condition.

== Pathology ==
This species carries the pathogenic Qalyub and African swine fever viruses and the spirochetes Borrelia crocidurae and Borrelia hispanica. When the tick is infected by B. crocidurae, the disease affects its genetic organ, the testes in males and the ovaries in females. The tick transmits the African swine fever virus only in Spain and Portugal.

The tick feeds at night, ingesting blood to repletion in about 15 minutes. Small mammals are the most common hosts; this species rarely bites humans, preferring other vertebrates. The tick has substances in its saliva, such as antihemostatic, anti-inflammatory, and immunomodulatory molecules, which help the tick get blood from the host and transfer pathogens easily. Major factors in their feeding relationship are mating, recent feeding, and size.

Some strains of entomopathogenic fungi have been found to be effective against this tick and others in the related genus Ornithodoros in a study which concluded the fungi could be used as biocontrol agents for argasid ticks; the name of this is called hyperparasitism.
