= Crimean–Congo hemorrhagic fever =

Disease of humans and other animals

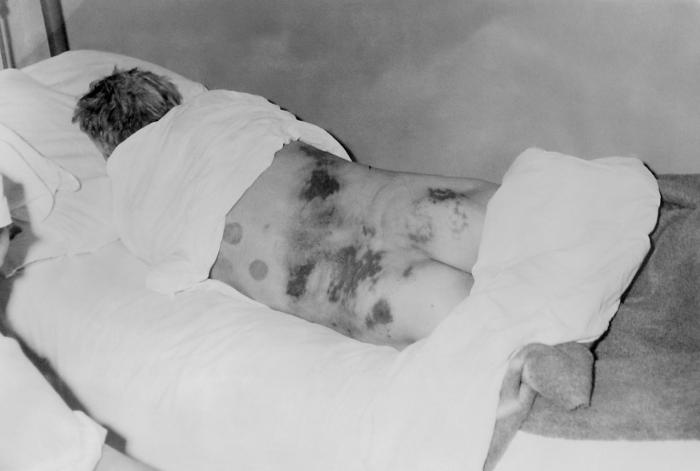
- Male diagnosed with Crimean–Congo hemorrhagic fever, 1969
- Specialty: Infectious disease
- Symptoms: Fever, muscle pains, headache, vomiting, diarrhea, bleeding into the skin
- Complications: Liver failure
- Usual onset: Rapid
- Duration: Two weeks
- Diagnostic method: Detecting antibodies, the virus's RNA, or viral proteins (antigens).
- Differential diagnosis: Dengue fever, Q fever, Ebola virus disease
- Treatment: Supportive care, ribavirin (off-label)
- Prognosis: Risk of death ~25%

Crimean–Congo hemorrhagic fever (CCHF) is a viral disease. Symptoms of CCHF may include fever, muscle pains, headache, vomiting, diarrhea, and bleeding into the skin. Onset of symptoms is less than two weeks following exposure. Complications may include liver failure. Survivors generally recover around two weeks after onset. CCHF is a tick-borne disease.

The causative agent of CCHF is the CCHF virus, which belongs to the genus Orthonairovirus. This virus was initially detected in the 1940s, when Soviet troops and local civilians in Crimea experienced a severe hemorrhagic illness. Decades later, during the 1960s, a similar virus was identified in Kisangani, today in the Democratic Republic of Congo. The two viruses were found to share antigenic properties, leading to their classification under the unified name Crimean-Congo Hemorrhagic Fever Virus (CCHFV). The CCHFV is typically spread by tick bites or close contact with the blood, secretions, organs or other bodily fluids of infected persons or animals. Groups that are at high risk of infection are farmers and those who work in slaughterhouses. The virus can also spread between people via body fluids. Diagnosis can be made by detecting antibodies, the virus's RNA, or viral proteins (antigens). It is a type of viral hemorrhagic fever where both reduced platelet count and disruption of coagulation of pathway contribute to hemorrhage.

There are no FDA- or WHO-approved therapeutics for CCHF, and a vaccine is not commercially available. Prevention involves avoiding tick bites, following safe practices in meat processing plants, and observing universal healthcare precautions. Treatment is typically with supportive care, and while the medication ribavirin is often used, as of 2023, there is not sufficient, high-quality evidence of its efficacy.

CCHF is a geographically widespread viral hemorrhagic fever, found in Eastern and Southern Europe, the Mediterranean, northwestern China, central Asia, Africa, the Middle East, and the Indian subcontinent. It is typically found in regions south of the 50th parallel north. Typically small outbreaks are seen in areas where the virus is endemic. In 2013 Iran, Russia, Turkey, and Uzbekistan documented more than 50 cases. Unlike most viral hemorrhagic fever diseases which occur usually in Africa, Asia and South America, CCHF is prevalent also in parts of Europe, especially in the Balkans and former USSR states (hantavirus hemorrhagic fever with renal syndrome caused by Puumala virus and Dobrava-Belgrade virus also occurs in Europe). The fatality rate of CCHF is typically between 10 and 40% though fatalities as high as 60%-80% and as low as 0%-5% have been observed in some outbreaks. The virus was first observed in Crimea in the 1940s. The case fatality for the Kosovo outbreak that occurred in the period of 1995 to 2013 was 25.5%.

In the past 20 years, CCHF outbreaks have been reported in eastern Europe, particularly in the former Soviet Union, throughout the Mediterranean, in northwestern China, central Asia, southern Europe, Africa, the Middle East, and the Indian subcontinent. In recent years the disease has extended its geographical range, moving towards the western part of Mediterranean Europe; in 2024, Portugal recorded its first-ever laboratory-confirmed human death from CCHF. CCHF is on WHO's priority list for Research and Development and the US National Institute of Allergy and Infectious Diseases (NIH/NIAID) priority A list, as a disease posing the highest level of risk to national security and public health. CCHF is the most widely distributed tick-borne viral disease in the world. In addition to becoming indigenous to the Iberian peninsula in the 21st century (with the first autochthonous human cases in the region confirmed in Spain in 2016), antibodies in cattle and wildlife have been detected in Southern France (although no human cases).

In the 12th century, a hemorrhagic syndrome with symptoms similar to CCHF was described on the territory of present day Tajikistan, and was said to be caused by an arthropod which was tough, small, related to a louse or tick, and normally parasitising a black bird.

== Signs and symptoms ==
The clinical illness associated with CCHFV (the CCHF virus) is a severe form of hemorrhagic fever. Following infection by a tick bite, the incubation period is typically two to three days but can last as long as nine days, while the incubation period following contact with infected blood or tissues is usually five to six days with a documented maximum of 13 days. After entering the human body, the virus multiplies within specific target cells, including endothelial cells, macrophages, and epithelial cells. This process activates both the innate and adaptive branches of the immune system. The onset of symptoms ushering in the pre-hemorrhagic phase is sudden, with fever, myalgia (muscle ache), dizziness, neck pain and stiffness, backache, headache, sore eyes, and photophobia (sensitivity to light).

Typical symptoms include nausea, vomiting (which may progress to severe bleeding and can be fatal if not treated), diarrhea, abdominal pain and sore throat early in the acute infection phase, followed by sharp mood swings, agitations and confusion. After several days, agitation may be replaced by sleepiness, depression and lassitude, and the abdominal pain may localize to the upper right quadrant, with detectable liver enlargement.

As the illness progresses into the hemorrhagic phase, large areas of severe bruising, severe nosebleeds, and uncontrolled bleeding at injection sites can be seen, beginning on about the fourth day of illness and lasting for about two weeks. Other clinical signs include tachycardia (fast heart rate), lymphadenopathy (enlarged lymph nodes), and petechiae (a rash caused by bleeding into the skin) on internal mucosal surfaces, such as the mouth and throat, and on the skin. The petechiae may give way to larger rashes called ecchymoses, and other haemorrhagic phenomena. There is usually evidence of hepatitis, and severely ill patients may experience rapid kidney deterioration, liver failure, or pulmonary failure after the fifth day of illness.

In documented outbreaks of CCHF, fatality rates in hospitalized patients have ranged from 9% to as high as 70%, though the WHO notes a typical range of 10–40%, with death often occurring in the second week of illness. In patients who recover, improvement generally begins on the ninth or tenth day after the onset of illness. The long-term effects of CCHF infection have not been studied adequately in survivors to determine whether or not specific complications exist. However, recovery is slow.

== Cause ==
=== Virology ===
Crimean-Congo hemorrhagic fever virus
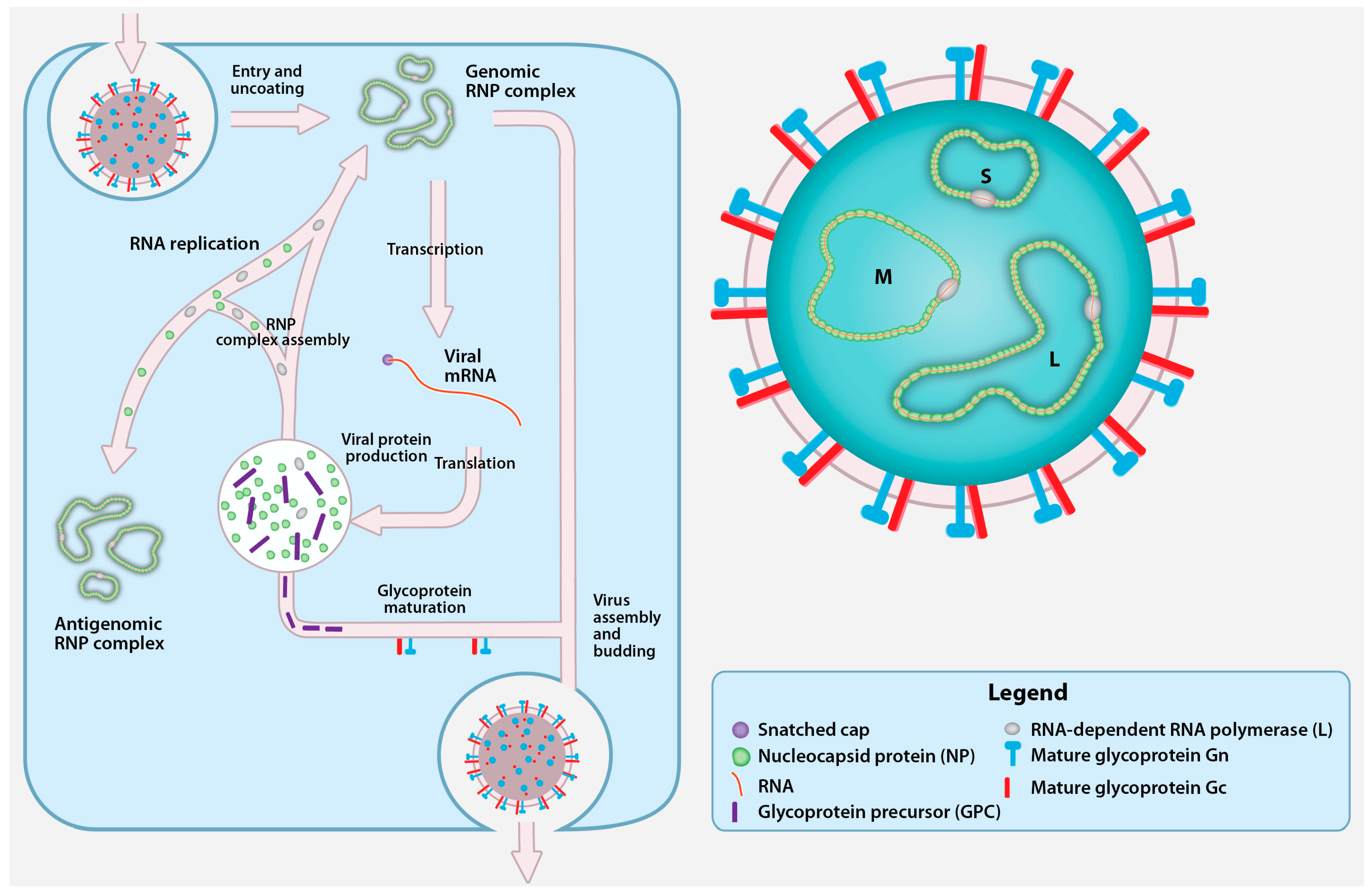
- Crimean–Congo hemorrhagic fever virus (CCHFV) virion and replication cycle.

Virus classification
- (unranked): Virus
- Realm: Riboviria
- Kingdom: Orthornavirae
- Phylum: Negarnaviricota
- Class: Bunyaviricetes
- Order: Hareavirales
- Family: Nairoviridae
- Genus: Orthonairovirus
- Species: Orthonairovirus haemorrhagiae

Synonyms
- Crimean-Congo hemorrhagic fever orthonairovirus

Crimean–Congo hemorrhagic fever virus (CCHFV) is a member of the genus Orthonairovirus, family Nairoviridae of RNA viruses.

The virions are 80–120 nanometers (nm) in diameter and are pleomorphic. There are no host ribosomes within the virion. Each virion contains three distinct RNA sequences, which together make up the viral genome. The envelope is single-layered and consists of a lipid bilayer 5 nm thick. It has no external protrusions. The envelope proteins form small projections ~5–10 nm long. The nucleocapsids are filamentous and circular with a length of 200–3000 nm. Viral entry is thought to be clathrin-mediated, with the cell surface protein nucleolin playing a role.

==== Molecular biology ====
The genome is circular, negative-sense RNA in three parts – Small (S), Medium (M), and Large (L). The L segment is 11–14.4 kilobases in length, while the M and S segments are 4.4–6.3 and 1.7–2.1 kilobases long, respectively. The L segment encodes the RNA polymerase, the M segment encodes the envelope glycoproteins (Gc and Gn), and the S segment encodes the nucleocapsid protein. The mutation rates for the three parts of the genome were estimated to be: 1.09×10^{−4}, 1.52×10^{−4} and 0.58×10^{−4} substitutions/site/year for the S, M, and L segments, respectively.

==== Population genetics ====
CCHFV is the most genetically diverse of the arboviruses: its nucleotide sequences frequently differ between different strains, ranging from a 20% variability for the viral S segment to 31% for the M segment. Viruses with diverse sequences can be found within the same geographic area; closely related viruses have been isolated from widely separated regions, suggesting that viral dispersion has occurred, possibly by ticks carried on migratory birds or through international livestock trade. Reassortment among genome segments during coinfection of ticks or vertebrates seems likely to have played a role in generating diversity in this virus.

Based on the sequence data, seven genotypes of CCHFV have been recognised: Africa 1 (Senegal), Africa 2 (Democratic Republic of the Congo and South Africa), Africa 3 (southern and western Africa), Europe 1 (Albania, Bulgaria, Kosovo, Russia and Turkey), Europe 2 (Greece), Asia 1 (the Middle East, Iran and Pakistan) and Asia 2 (China, Kazakhstan, Tajikistan and Uzbekistan).

=== Transmission ===
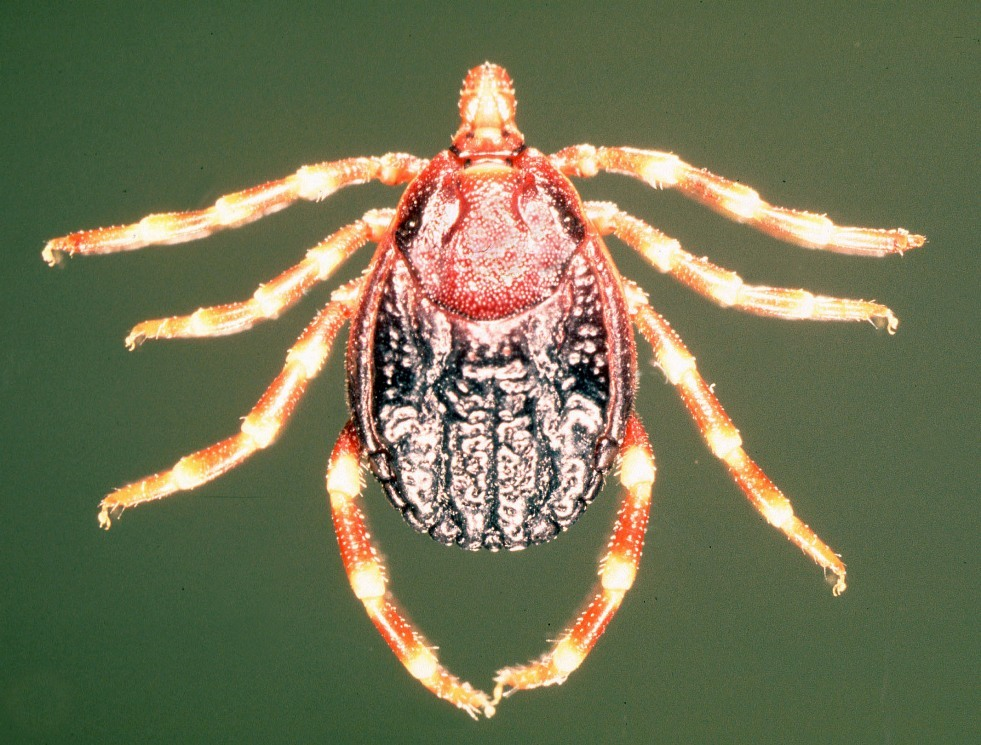
Hyalomma tick

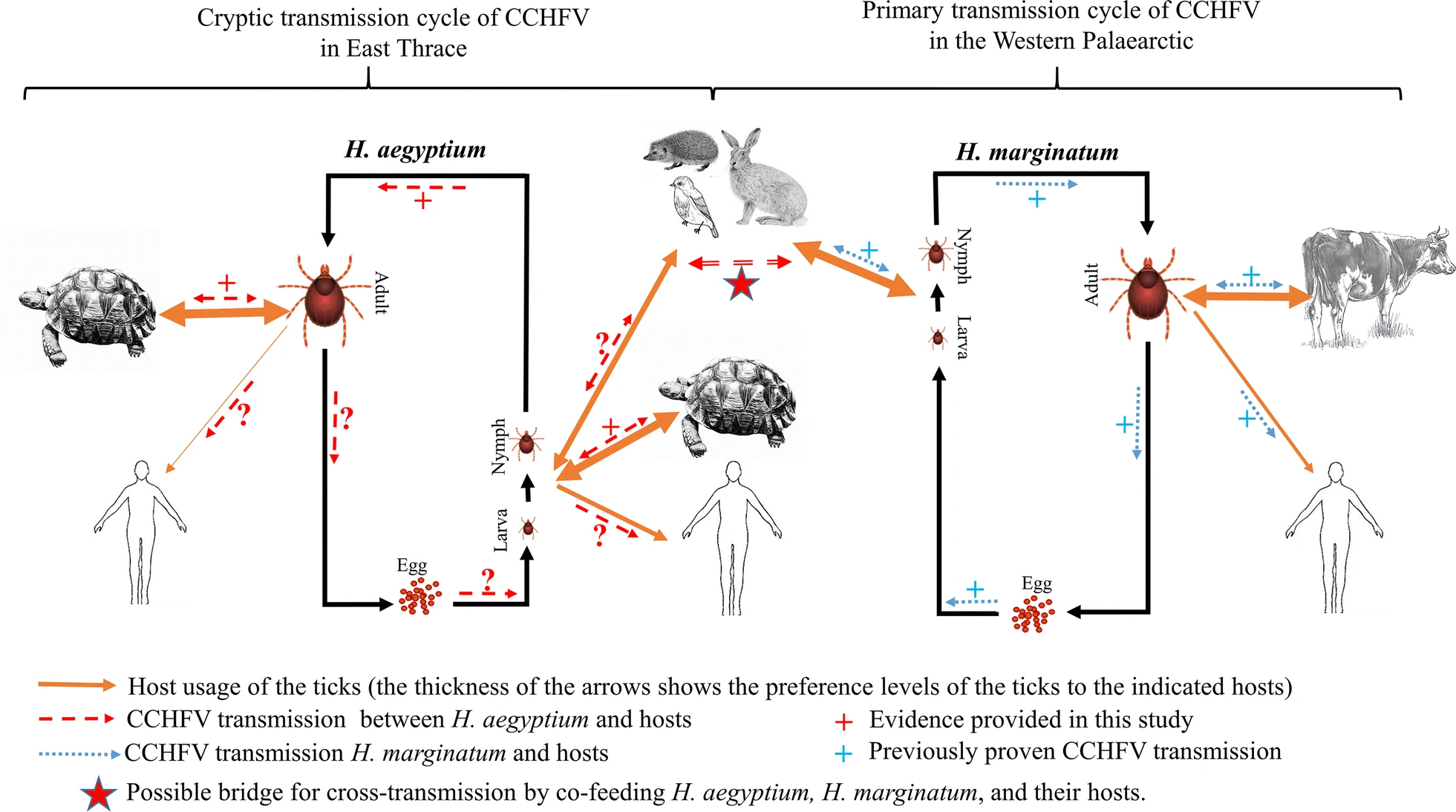
Proposed cryptic CCHFV transmission cycle in H. aegyptium and their hosts in East Thrace and the well-described primary CCHFV transmission cycle in H. marginatum and their hosts in the Palaearctic

Ticks are both "environmental reservoir" and vector for the virus, carrying it from wild animals to domestic animals and humans. Tick species identified as infected with the virus include Argas reflexus, Hyalomma anatolicum, Hyalomma detritum, Hyalomma marginatum marginatum and Rhipicephalus sanguineus. At least 31 different species of ticks from the genera Haemaphysalis and Hyalomma in southeastern Iran have been found to carry the virus.

Wild animals and small mammals, particularly European hare, Middle-African hedgehogs, and multimammate rats are the "amplifying hosts" of the virus. Birds are generally resistant to CCHF, except ostriches. Domestic animals like sheep, goats and cattle can develop high titers of virus in their blood, but tend not to fall ill.

The "sporadic infection" of humans is usually caused by a Hyalomma tick bite. Animals can transmit the virus to humans, but this would usually be as part of a disease cluster. When clusters of illness occur, it is typically after people treat, butcher, or eat infected livestock, particularly ruminants and ostriches. Outbreaks have occurred in abattoirs and other places where workers have been exposed to infected human or animal blood and fomites Humans can infect humans, and outbreaks also occur in clinical facilities through infected blood and unclean medical instruments.

== Prevention ==
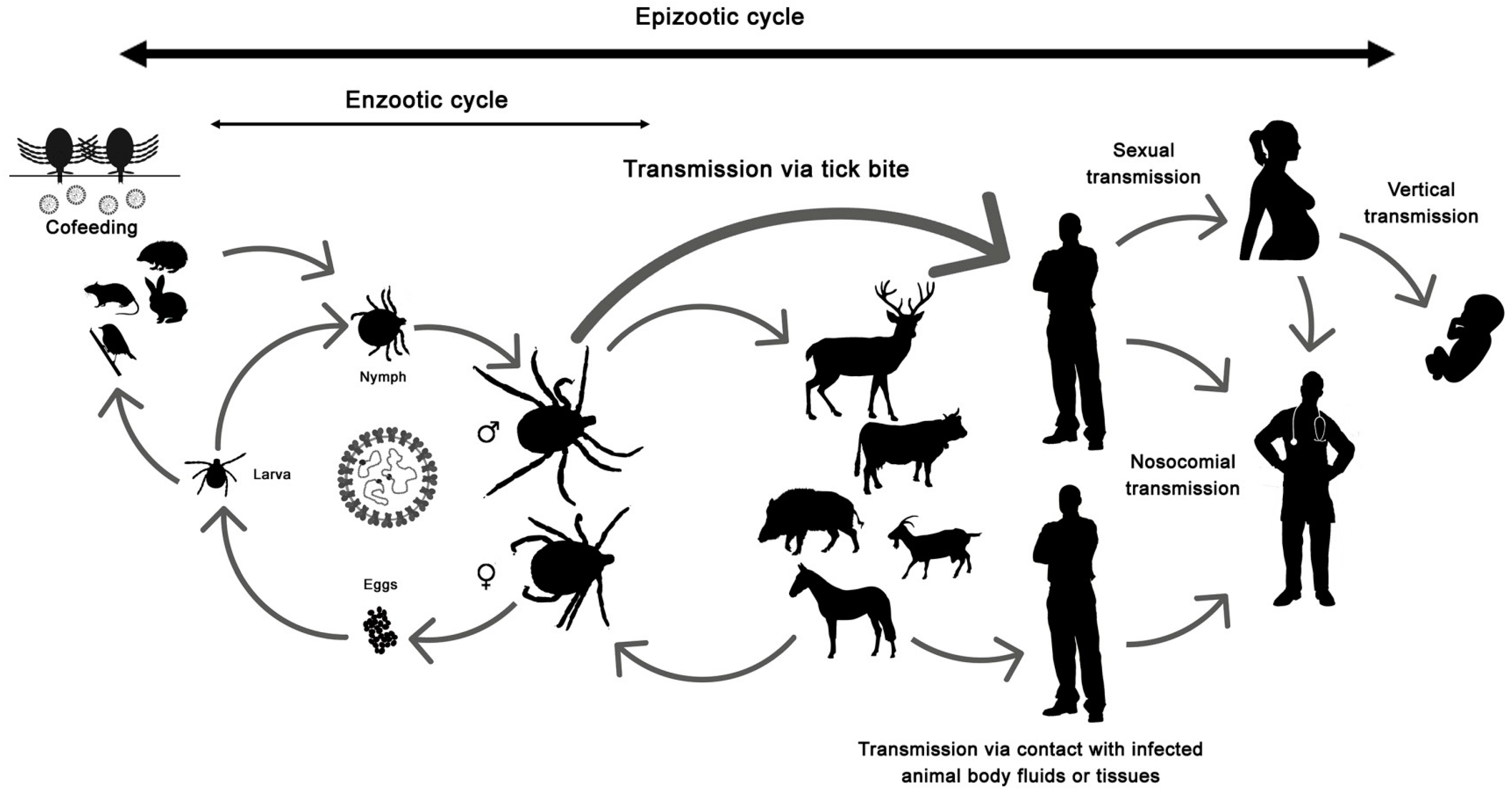
Crimean-Congo hemorrhagic fever virus (CCHFV) cycle and its routes of transmission

Where mammalian tick infection is common, agricultural regulations require deticking farm animals before transportation or delivery for slaughter. Personal tick avoidance measures are recommended, such as the use of insect repellents, adequate clothing, and body inspection for adherent ticks.

When feverish patients with evidence of bleeding require resuscitation or intensive care, body substance isolation precautions should be taken.

=== Vaccine ===
Since the 1970s, several vaccine trials around the world against CCHF have been terminated due to high toxicity.

As of March 2011, the only available and probably somewhat efficacious CCHF vaccine has been an inactivated antigen preparation then used in Bulgaria. No publication in the scientific literature related to this vaccine exists, which a Turkish virologist called suspicious both because antiquated technology and mouse brain were used to manufacture it. More vaccines are under development, but the sporadic nature of the disease, even in endemic countries, suggests that large trials of vaccine efficacy will be difficult to perform. Finding volunteers may prove challenging, given growing anti-vaccination sentiment and resistance of populations to vaccination against contagious diseases. The number of people to be vaccinated and the length of time they would have to be followed to confirm protection would have to be carefully defined. Alternatively, many scientists appear to believe that treatment of CCHF with ribavirin is more practical than prevention, but some recently conducted clinical trials appear to counter assumptions of drug efficacy. In 2011, a Turkish research team led by Erciyes University successfully developed the first non-toxic preventive vaccine, which passed clinical trials. As of 2012, the vaccine was pending approval by the US FDA.

Since the Ebola epidemic, the WHO jumpstarted a "Blueprint for Research and Development preparedness" on emerging pathogens with epidemic potential, against which there are no medical treatments. CCHF was the top priority on the initial list from December 2015, and is second as of January 2017.

== Treatment ==
Treatment is mostly supportive. Ribavirin has shown some efficacy in vitro and has been used by mouth during outbreaks, but there is uncertain evidence to support its use, and this medication can cause serious side effects, including haemolytic anemia and liver damage.

As of 2011, the use of immunoglobulin preparations has remained unproven, and antibody engineering, which raised hopes for monoclonal antibody therapy, has remained in its infancy.

Recurrent outbreaks of Crimean-Congo haemorrhagic fever in recent years have led to a resurgence in research into potential treatments, with favipiravir showing better effectiveness than ribavirin in animal models, and a combination of ribavirin and favipiravir allowing lower doses of ribavirin to be used, thereby improving the side effect profile. Other potential antiviral agents, such as 2'-Deoxy-2'-fluorocytidine, remain in preclinical development and have not yet progressed to human trials. Corticosteroids may produce some relief of acute symptoms, but as with ribavirin, effectiveness is limited. However, while these approaches show promise in animal studies, there has been limited study in human patients other than experimental use in single cases, so there is still no approved treatment regimen for CCHF other than supportive care. Molnupiravir on the other hand has shown good results in vitro, but has failed to do so in vivo in mice. However, studying CCHFV and the effect of antivirals in vivo can be challenging due to a lack of appropriate animal models, as the infection shows clinical symptoms only in humans, not in animals.

== Epidemiology ==
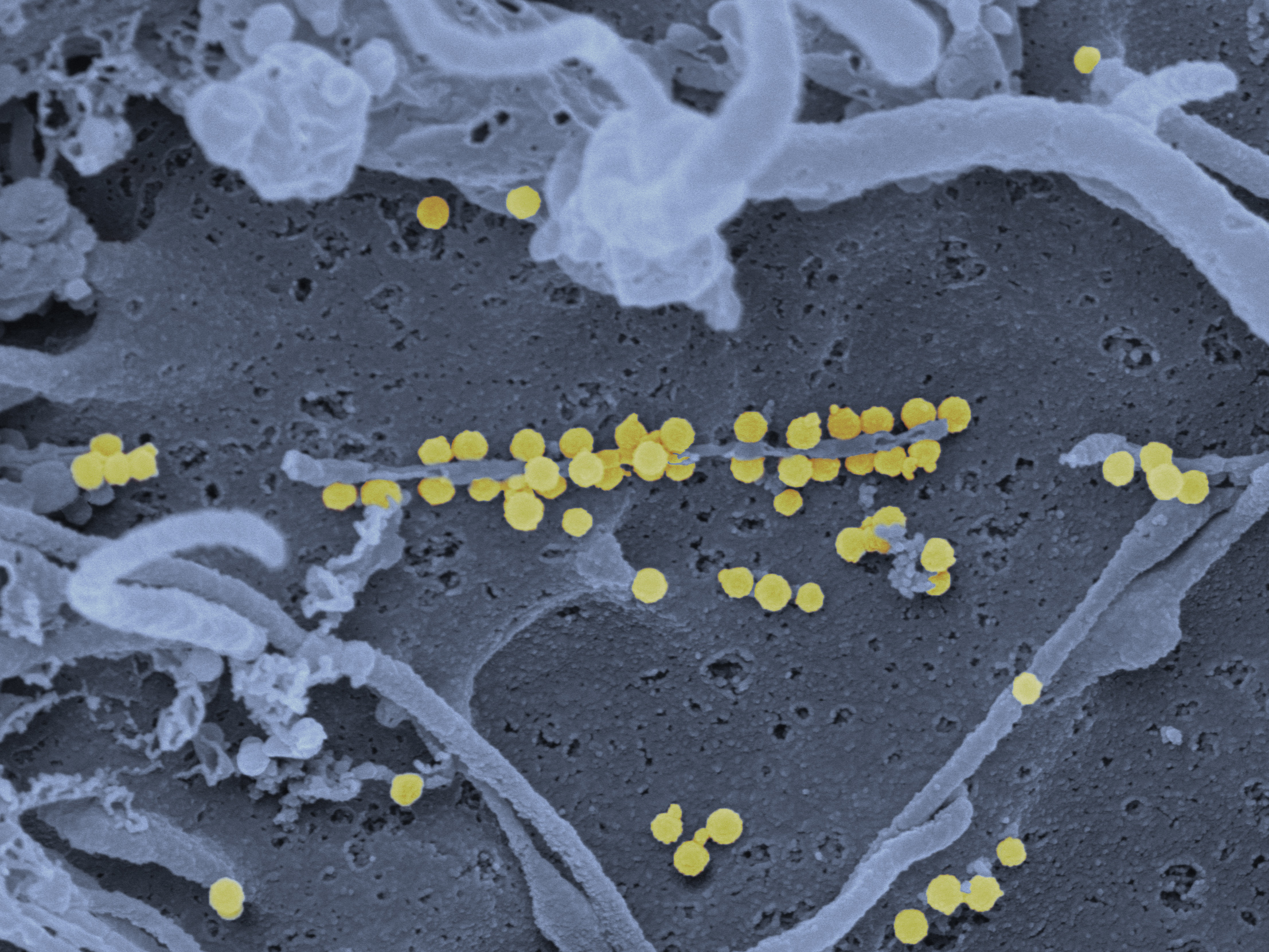
Colorized scanning electron micrograph of viral CCHF particles in yellow

CCHF occurs most frequently among agricultural workers, following the bite of an infected tick, and to a lesser extent among slaughterhouse workers exposed to the blood and tissues of infected livestock, and medical personnel through contact with the body fluids of infected persons.

=== Geographic distribution ===
As of 2013, the northern limit of CCHF has been 50 degrees northern latitude, north of which the Hyalomma ticks have not been found. Per a WHO map from 2008, Hyalomma ticks occurred south of this latitude across all of the Eurasian continent and Africa, sparing only the islands of Sri Lanka, Indonesia and Japan. Serological or virological evidence of CCHF was widespread in Asia, including the Middle East (except Israel, Lebanon, and Jordan), Eastern Europe, central Africa, Western Africa, South Africa, and Madagascar.

In 2008, more than 50 cases/year were reported from only four countries: Turkey, Iran, Russia, and Uzbekistan. 5-49 cases/year were present in South Africa, Central Asia, including Pakistan and Afghanistan (but sparing Turkmenistan), in the Middle East, only the UAE and the Balkan countries, limited to Romania, Bulgaria, Serbia, Montenegro, and Albania.

In Russia, the disease is limited to the Southern Federal District and North Caucasian Federal District, but climate change may cause it to spread into more northerly areas. In 2017, the first case of Crimean–Congo hemorrhagic fever since 1967 was reported in the Republic of Crimea, administered by Russia but internationally recognized as part of Ukraine. It is speculated that the importation of livestock with infected ticks from endemic regions of southern Russia since 2015 has contributed to the introduction of a subvariant of CCHF to Crimea, where previously only an endemic subvariant had been found.

A 2014 map by the CDC shows endemic areas (in red) largely unchanged in Africa and the Middle East, but different for the Balkans, including all countries of the former Yugoslavia, and also Greece, but no longer Romania. India's northwestern regions of Rajasthan and Gujarat saw their first cases.

=== Outbreaks ===
From 1995 to 2013, 228 cases of CCHF were reported in the Republic of Kosovo, with a case-fatality rate of 25.5%.

Between 2002–2008, the Ministry of Health of Turkey reported 2,508 CCHF cases and 133 deaths. During 2005, authorities reported 41 cases of CCHF in central Turkey's Yozgat Province, with one death.

In 2003, 38 people were infected with CCHF in Mauritania, including 35 residents of Nouakchott.

In September 2010, an outbreak was reported in Pakistan's Khyber Pakhtunkhwa province. Poor diagnosis and record keeping caused the extent of the outbreak to be uncertain, though some reports indicated over 100 cases, with a case-fatality rate above 10%.

In January 2011, the first human cases of CCHF in India were reported in Sanand, Gujarat, India, with 4 reported deaths, which included the index patient, treating physician, and nurse.

As of May 2012, 71 people were reported to have contracted the disease in Iran, resulting in 8 fatalities.

In October 2012, a British man died from the disease at the Royal Free Hospital in London. He had earlier been admitted to Gartnavel General Hospital in Glasgow, after returning on a flight from Kabul in Afghanistan.

In July 2013, seven people died of CCHF in the Karyana village of Babra, Gujarat, India.

In August 2013, a farmer from Agago, Uganda, was treated at Kalongo Hospital for a confirmed CCHF infection. The deaths of three other individuals in the northern region were suspected to have been caused by the virus. Another unrelated CCHF patient was admitted to Mulago Hospital on the same day. The Ministry of Health announced on the 19th that the outbreak was under control, but the second patient, a 27-year-old woman from Nansana, died on the 21st. She is believed to have contracted the virus from her husband, who returned to Kampala after being treated for CCHF in Juba, South Sudan.

In June 2014, cases were diagnosed in Kazakhstan. Ten people, including an ambulance crew, were admitted to a hospital in southern Kazakhstan with suspected CCHF. In July 2014, an 8th person was found to be infected with CCHF at Hayatabad Medical Complex (HMC), Pakistan. The eight patients, including a nurse and 6 Afghan nationals, died between April and July 2014.

As of 2015, sporadic confirmed cases have been reported from Bhuj, Amreli, Sanand, Idar and Vadnagar in Gujarat, India. In November 2014, a doctor and a labourer in north Gujarat tested positive for the disease. In the following weeks, three more people died from CCHF. In March 2015, one more person died of CCHF in Gujarat. As of 2015, among livestock, CCHF was recognized as "widespread" in India, only 4 years after the first human case had been diagnosed.

In August 2016, the first local case of CCHF in Western Europe occurred in Western Spain. A 62-year-old man, who had been bitten by a tick in Spain, died on August 25, infecting a nurse. The tick bite occurred in the province of Ávila, 300 km away from the province of Cáceres, where CCHF viral RNA from ticks was amplified in 2010. As of July 2017 it was unclear what specific ecology led to the Spanish cases.

In August 2016, several Pakistani news sources raised concerns regarding the disease. Between January and October 2016, CCHF outbreaks in Pakistan were reported with highest numbers of cases and deaths during August 2016, just before the festival of Eid-al-Adha (held on September 13–15 in 2016). It was hypothesized that the festival could play an important part, as people could come into contact with domestic or imported animals potentially infected with the CCHF virus. The Pakistani NIH showed there was no correlation, and that CCHF cases have coincided with the peak tick proliferation during the preceding 8–10 years.

In 2017, the General Directorate of Public Health in Turkey published official records of infections and casualties involving CCHF between 2008 and 2017. Cases declined from 1,318 in 2009 to 343 in 2017 alongside a lowered mortality rate. Cases are concentrated in rural areas of the southern Black Sea region, Central Anatolia region, and Eastern Anatolia region during early summer months.

On February 2, 2020, an outbreak was reported in Mali involving fourteen cases and seven deaths, days before the COVID-19 pandemic in Africa. In May 2020, a single case was reported in Mauritania.

In 2022, an outbreak occurred in Iraq. Between 1 January and 22 May, 212 cases of CCHF were reported to the WHO. Of the 212 cases, 115 were suspected and 97 laboratory confirmed. Twenty-seven deaths were recorded, of which 13 were in laboratory-confirmed cases.

In July 2023, there was a single confirmed fatality of tick-borne CCHF in North Macedonia.

In July 2024, a lethal tick-borne CCHF case was confirmed in Spain.

In August 2024, the first-ever recorded laboratory-confirmed tick-borne CCHF case was confirmed in Portugal. The 80-year-old male patient did not survive.

In 2025, a 72-year-old man who was a livestock farmer in Greece died of tick-borne CCHF.

== History ==
In ancient Celtic settlements in the Upper Danube area in Germany, the CCHF virus was detected in archaeological blood samples, indicating that it was endemic at the time. The virus may have evolved around 1500–1100 BC. It is thought that changing climate and agricultural practices around this time could be behind its evolution.

In the 12th century, a case of a hemorrhagic disease reported from what is now Tajikistan may have been the first known case of Crimean–Congo hemorrhagic fever.

In 1944, roughly 200 Soviet military agricultural workers were infected by Crimean hemorrhagic fever (CHF), leading to experiments showing a tick-borne viral etiology.

In February 1967, virologists John P. Woodall, David Simpson, Ghislaine Courtois, and others published initial reports on a virus they called the Congo virus. In 1956, the Congo virus had first been isolated by physician Ghislaine Courtois, head of the Provincial Medical Laboratory, Stanleyville, in the Belgian Congo. Strain V3010, isolated by Courtois, was sent to the Rockefeller Foundation Virus Laboratory (RFVL) in New York City and found to be identical to another strain from Uganda, but to no other named virus at that time.

In June 1967, Soviet virologist Mikhail Chumakov registered an isolate from a fatal case that occurred in Samarkand in the Catalogue of Arthropod-borne Viruses. In 1969, the Russian strain, which Chumakov had sent to the RFVL, was found to be antigenically indistinguishable from the Congo virus.

In 1973, the International Committee on Taxonomy of Viruses adopted Crimean–Congo hemorrhagic fever virus as the official name.

These reports include records of the occurrence of the virus or antibodies to the virus from Greece, Portugal, South Africa, Madagascar (the first isolation from there), the Maghreb, Dubai, Saudi Arabia, Kuwait and Iraq.
