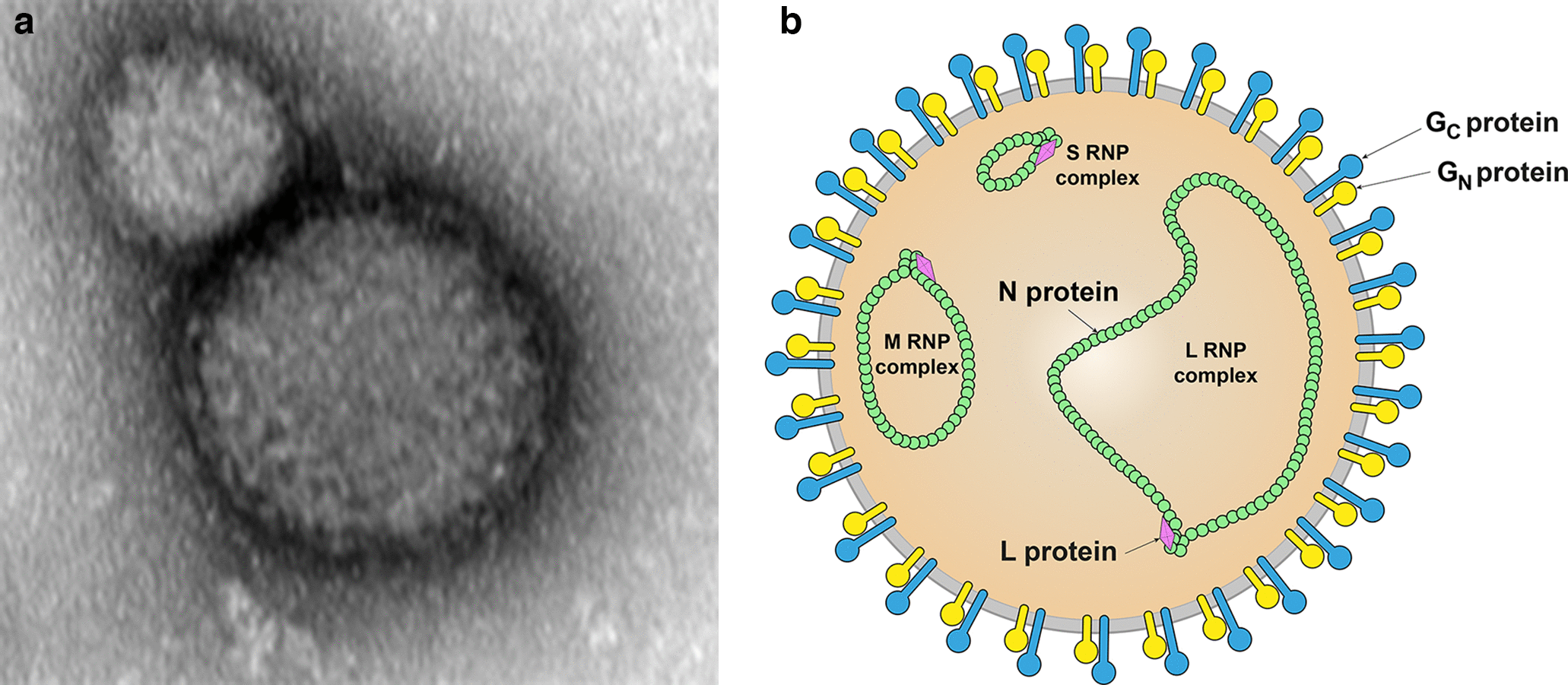
- Crimean-Congo hemorrhagic fever orthonairovirus virion and structure
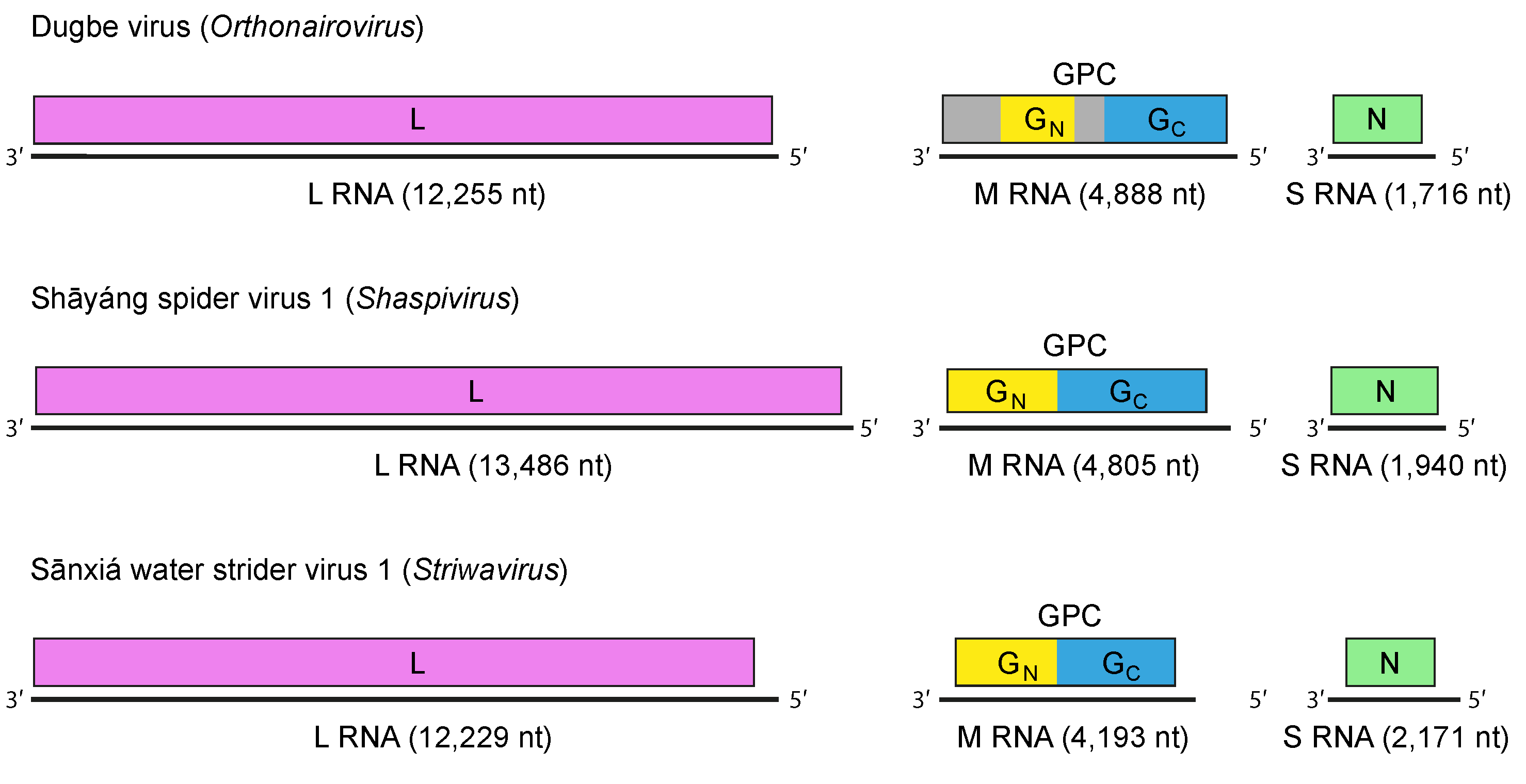
- Nairovidae member genomes

Virus classification
- (unranked): Virus
- Realm: Riboviria
- Kingdom: Orthornavirae
- Phylum: Negarnaviricota
- Class: Bunyaviricetes
- Order: Hareavirales
- Family: Nairoviridae

= Nairoviridae =

Family of viruses

Nairoviridae is a family of viruses in the order Hareavirales. Its name derives from Nairobi sheep disease, caused by the member Nairobi sheep disease orthonairovirus.

== Taxonomy ==
The family contains the following genera:

- Norwavirus
- Ocetevirus
- Orthonairovirus
- Sabavirus
- Shaspivirus
- Sitinavirus
- Striwavirus
- Xinspivirus
