= Hareavirales =

Virus classification
- (unranked): Virus
- Realm: Riboviria
- Kingdom: Orthornavirae
- Phylum: Negarnaviricota
- Class: Bunyaviricetes
- Order: Hareavirales

Order of viruses

Hareavirales is an order of viruses. The order belongs to the class Bunyaviricetes and contains nine families.

== Taxonomy ==
The order contains the following families:

- Arenaviridae
- Discoviridae
- Konkoviridae
- Leishbuviridae
- Mypoviridae
- Nairoviridae
- Phenuiviridae
- Tosoviridae
- Wupedeviridae
