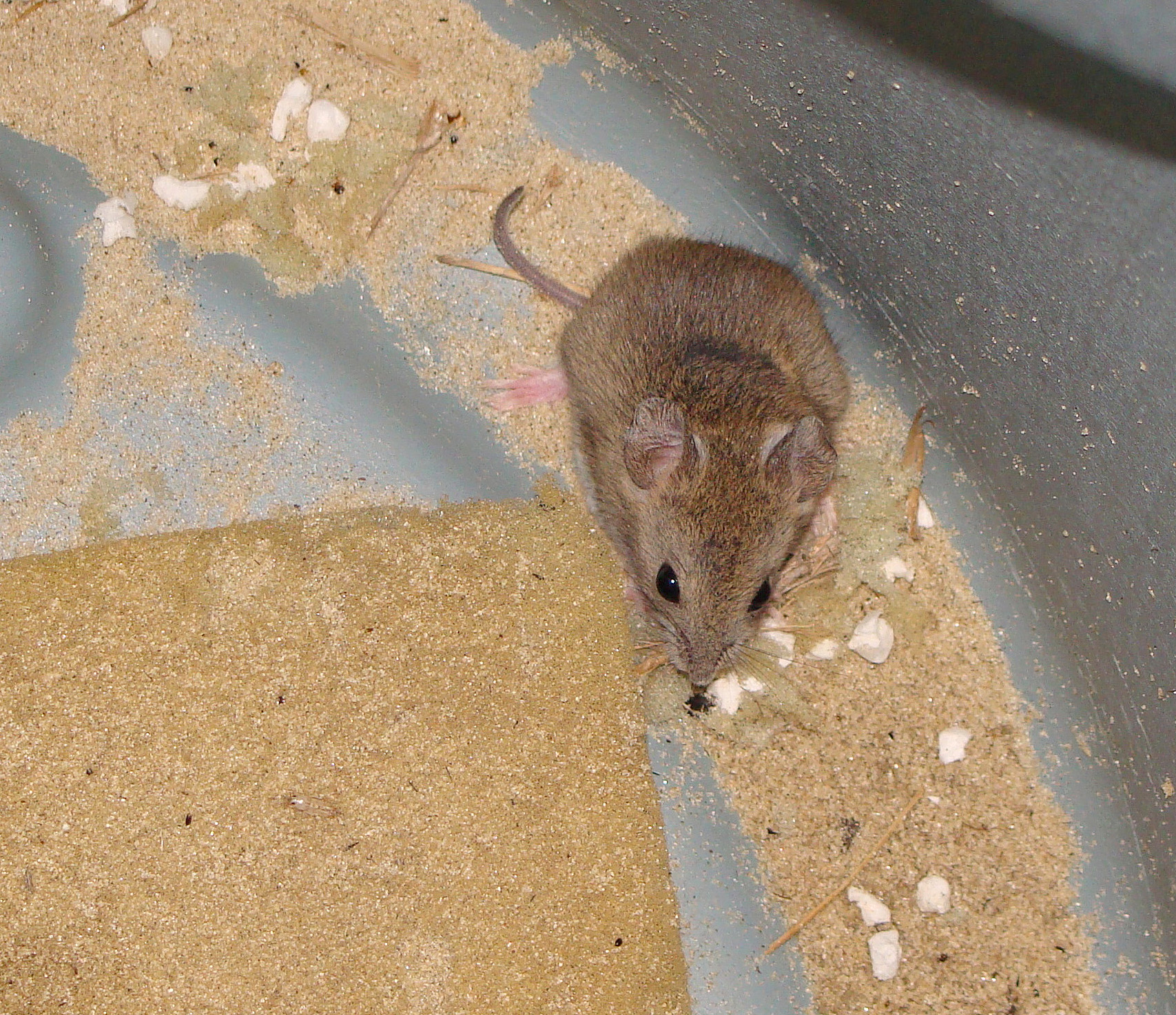
- Small vesper mouse (Calomys laucha)

Scientific classification
- Kingdom: Animalia
- Phylum: Chordata
- Class: Mammalia
- Infraclass: Placentalia
- Order: Rodentia
- Family: Cricetidae
- Subfamily: Sigmodontinae
- Tribe: Phyllotini
- Genus: Calomys; Waterhouse, 1837

Type species
- Mus bimaculatus

Species
- Calomys boliviae Calomys callidus Calomys callosus Calomys cerqueirai Calomys expulsus Calomys fecundus Calomys hummelincki Calomys laucha Calomys lepidus Calomys musculinus Calomys sorellus Calomys tener Calomys tocantinsi Calomys venustus

Synonyms
- Hesperomys Waterhouse, 1839

= Vesper mouse =

Vesper mouse Temporal range: Pleistocene to Recent

Genus of rodents

Vesper mice are rodents belonging to the genus Calomys. They are widely distributed in South America. Some species are notable as the vectors of Argentinian hemorrhagic fever and Bolivian hemorrhagic fever.

The genus was originally named Hesperomys, but was changed to Calomys in 1962.

== History ==
Hesperomys was introduced by George Robert Waterhouse in 1839 for the American rodents with cusps arranged in two series. The name combines the Greek ἑσπερος "west" and μυς "mouse". He considered it possible that species of Hesperomys would be found in the Old World, but did not doubt that the Americas were their chief abode. He included as species Mus bimaculatus (=Calomys laucha), Mus griseo-flavus (=Graomys griseoflavus), Mus Darwinii (=Phyllotis darwini), Mus zanthopygus (=Phyllotis xanthopygus), Mus galapagoensis (=Aegialomys galapagoensis), Symidon hispidum (=Sigmodon hispidus), Mus leucopus (=Peromyscus leucopus), and the woodrats (Neotoma).

In following years, authors like Johann Andreas Wagner and Spencer Fullerton Baird expanded the genus to include additional American species, such as those placed now in Scapteromys, Oxymycterus, Abrothrix, and Peromyscus. In 1874, Elliott Coues designated Mus bimaculatus Waterhouse as the type species of Hesperomys. In 1888, Herluf Winge used Hesperomys in a sense similar to modern Calomys (but confusingly placed species related to what is now known as Oryzomys in Calomys), but in the same year Oldfield Thomas argued that Hesperomys could not be separated from the hamsters (Cricetus). In 1896, however, he united it with Eligmodontia instead, where it remained until he reinstated it for modern Calomys in 1916. He did not use Calomys (introduced by Waterhouse in 1837 for Mus bimaculatus), because he thought it to be preoccupied by an earlier name Callomys d'Orbigny and Geoffroy, 1830. In 1962, Philip Hershkovitz noted that the International Code of Zoological Nomenclature mandates that a name cannot be considered preoccupied even when it differs by only one letter from another, so Callomys cannot invalidate Calomys. As Calomys Waterhouse, 1837, and Hesperomys Waterhouse, 1839, both had Mus bimaculatus as their type species, the two are objective synonyms and the older name, Calomys, prevails; since then, Hesperomys has no longer been in use as a valid name.
