= American hemorrhagic fever =

American hemorrhagic fever may refer to:

- Argentine hemorrhagic fever
- Bolivian hemorrhagic fever
