= Bear Canyon virus =

Virus classification
- (unranked): Virus
- Realm: Riboviria
- Kingdom: Orthornavirae
- Phylum: Negarnaviricota
- Class: Bunyaviricetes
- Order: Hareavirales
- Family: Arenaviridae
- Genus: Mammarenavirus
- Species: Mammarenavirus bearense

Synonyms
- Bear Canyon mammarenavirus

Species of virus

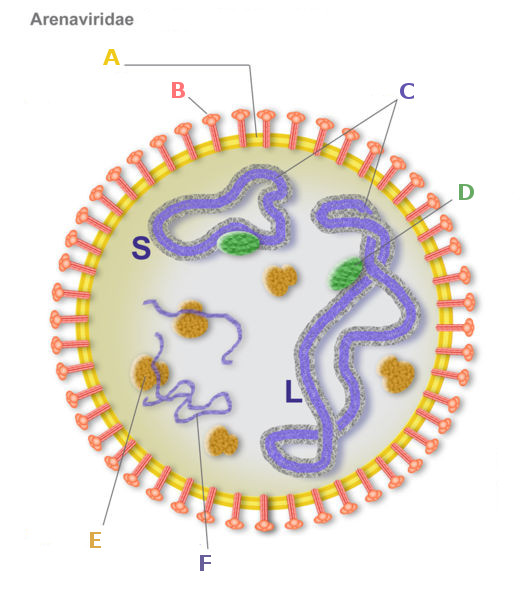

Bear Canyon virus (BCNV), is a Mammarenavirus similar to Whitewater Arroyo virus (WWAV) and Tamiami virus (TAMV); all three being New World arenaviruses. The virus is named after Bear Canyon, the area it was originally discovered in.
