= Chapare =

Chapare may refer to:

- Chapare Province, Bolivia
- Chapare River

It may also refer to:

- Chapare virus
