= Mopeia virus =

Virus classification
- (unranked): Virus
- Realm: Riboviria
- Kingdom: Orthornavirae
- Phylum: Negarnaviricota
- Class: Bunyaviricetes
- Order: Hareavirales
- Family: Arenaviridae
- Genus: Mammarenavirus
- Species: Mammarenavirus mopeiaense

Strains
- Mozambique; Zimbabwe

Synonyms
- Mopeia mammarenavirus; Mozambique virus (MV)

Species of virus

Mopeia virus (MOPV) is a species of virus in the genus Mammarenavirus. It was initially isolated from the Mastomys natalensis mouse in the East African country of Mozambique in 1977. It is of the "Old World" Arenavirus lineage and is closely related to Lassa mammarenavirus, sharing 75% of its amino acid sequence.

== Mopeia virus disease ==
Mopeia virus has not been known to cause disease in humans, although it is capable of infecting human cell lines in vitro. Infection of primates with the virus was demonstrated to prevent clinical disease following Lassa virus infection, indicating potential for use as a prophylactic vaccine for Lassa Fever.

== Geographic distribution ==
Although initially isolated in Mozambique, it has also been detected in rodents in Zimbabwe, and Tanzania.
