= Tocantins vesper mouse =

Conservation status
- Least Concern (IUCN 3.1)

Scientific classification
- Kingdom: Animalia
- Phylum: Chordata
- Class: Mammalia
- Order: Rodentia
- Family: Cricetidae
- Subfamily: Sigmodontinae
- Genus: Calomys
- Species: C. tocantinsi

Binomial name
- Calomys tocantinsi Bonvicino, Lima and Almeida, 2003

Species of rodent

The Tocantins vesper mouse (Calomys tocantinsi) is a South American rodent species of the family Cricetidae. It is found in Brazil. Its karyotype has 2n = 46 and FNa = 66.
