= Argentine hemorrhagic fever =

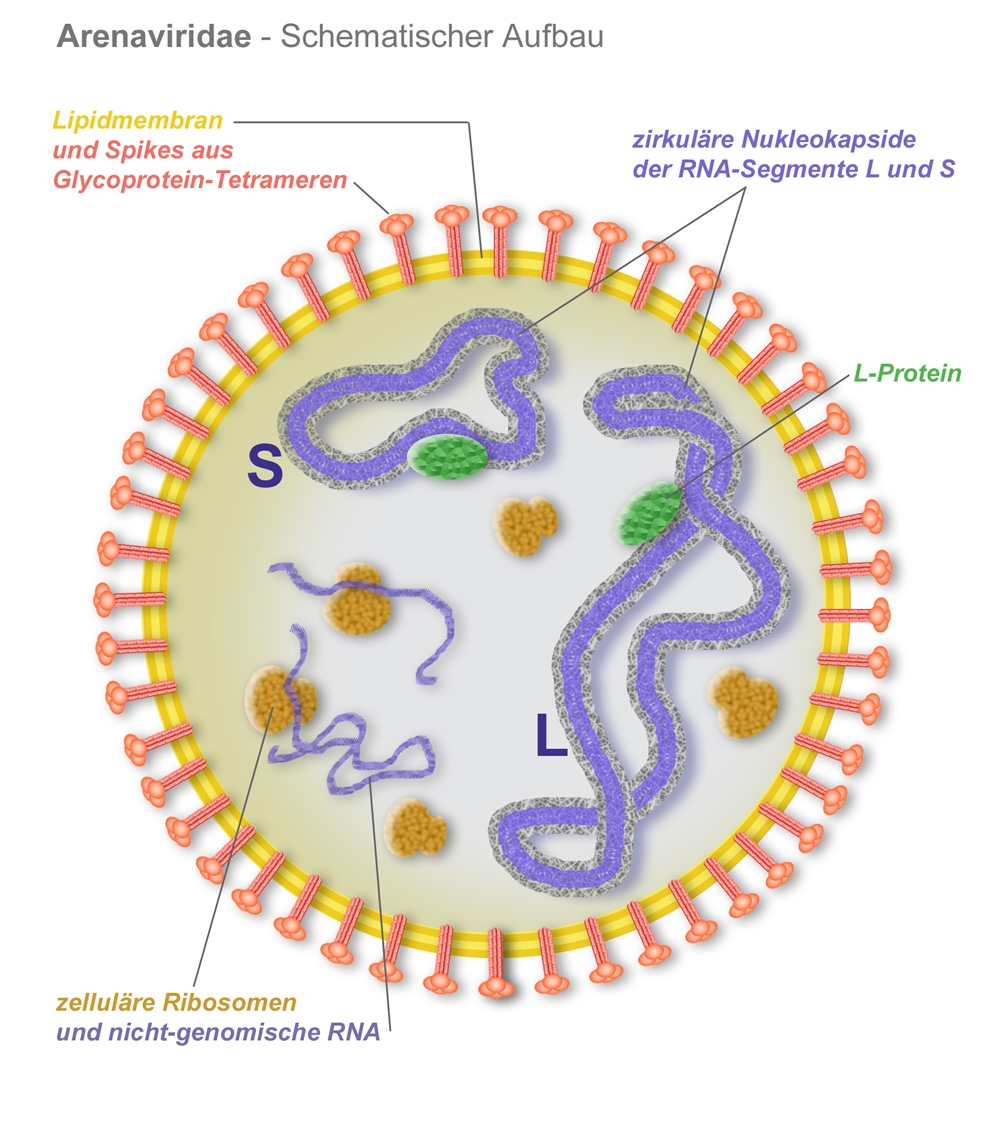
- Specialty: Infectious disease

Argentine hemorrhagic fever (AHF) or O'Higgins disease, also known in Argentina as mal de los rastrojos (stubble disease) is a hemorrhagic fever and zoonotic infectious disease occurring in Argentina. It is caused by the Junín virus (an arenavirus, closely related to the Machupo virus, causative agent of Bolivian hemorrhagic fever). Its reservoir of infection is the drylands vesper mouse, a rodent found in Argentina and Paraguay.

== Epidemiology ==
The disease was first reported in the town of O'Higgins in Buenos Aires province, Argentina in 1958, giving it one of the names by which it is known. Theories about its nature included: Weil's disease, leptospirosis, chemical pollution. It was associated with fields containing stubble after the harvest, giving it another of its names.

The endemic area of AHF covers approximately 150,000 km^{2}, compromising the provinces of Buenos Aires, Córdoba, Santa Fe and La Pampa, with an estimated risk population of 5 million.

The natural reservoir of infection, a small rodent known locally as ratón maicero ("maize mouse"; Calomys musculinus), has chronic asymptomatic infection, and spreads the virus through its saliva and urine. Infection is produced through contact of skin or mucous membranes, or through inhalation of infected particles. While epidemiological data are limited, the proportion of male case ranges from 60 to 81%.

== Clinical aspects ==
AHF is a grave acute disease which may progress to recovery or death in 1 to 2 weeks. The incubation time of the disease is between 10 and 12 days, after which the first symptoms appear: fever, headaches, weakness, loss of appetite and will. These intensify less than a week later, forcing the infected to lie down, and producing stronger symptoms such as vascular, renal, hematological and neurological alterations. This stage lasts about 3 weeks.

If untreated, the mortality of AHF reaches 15–30%. The specific treatment includes plasma of recovered patients, which, if started early, is extremely effective and reduces mortality to 1%.

Ribavirin also has shown some promise in treating arenaviral diseases.

The disease was first detected in the 1950s in the Junín Partido in Buenos Aires, after which its agent, the Junín virus, was named upon its identification in 1958. In the early years, about 1,000 cases per year were recorded, with a high mortality rate (more than 30%). The initial introduction of treatment serums in the 1970s reduced this lethality.

=== Vaccine ===
The Candid #1 vaccine for AHF was created in 1985 by Argentine virologist Dr. Julio Barrera Oro. The vaccine was manufactured by the Salk Institute in the United States, and became available in Argentina in 1990. Antibodies produced by Candid #1 vaccination have also demonstrated cross-reactivity with Machupo virus in Rhesus macaques, and thus Candid #1 been considered for prophylactic use against Bolivian hemorrhagic fever.

Candid #1 has been applied to adult high-risk population and is 95.5% effective. Between 1991 and 2005 more than 240,000 people were vaccinated, achieving a great decrease in the numbers of reported cases (94 suspect and 19 confirmed in 2005).

On 29 August 2006 the Maiztegui Institute obtained certification for the production of the vaccine in Argentina. The vaccine produced in Argentina was found to be of similar effectiveness to the US vaccine. Details of the vaccine were published in 2011, and a protocol for production of the vaccine was published in 2018.The vaccine is currently available in Argentina, and is recommended for those with potential occupational exposure to the Junin virus.

The Candid #1 vaccine is not licensed in the US due to concerns regarding its viral attenuation, and its ability to revert back into viral form, although the vaccine was developed in the US.

== Weaponization ==
Argentine hemorrhagic fever was one of three hemorrhagic fevers and one of more than a dozen agents that the United States researched as potential biological weapons before the nation suspended its biological weapons program. The Soviet Union also conducted research and developing programs on the potential of the hemorragic fever as a biological weapon.
