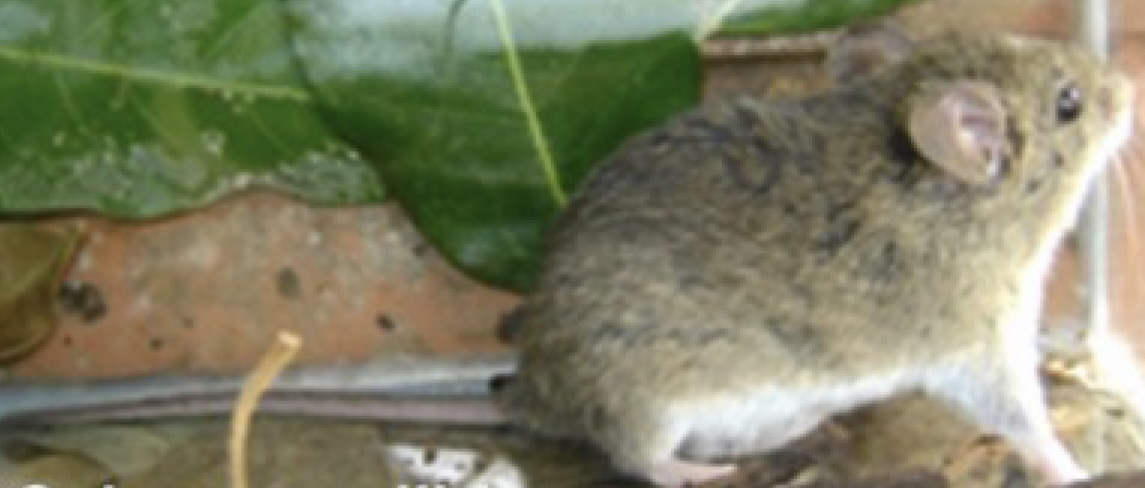
- Calomys callidus

Conservation status
- Least Concern (IUCN 3.1)

Scientific classification
- Kingdom: Animalia
- Phylum: Chordata
- Class: Mammalia
- Order: Rodentia
- Family: Cricetidae
- Subfamily: Sigmodontinae
- Genus: Calomys
- Species: C. callidus

Binomial name
- Calomys callidus (Thomas, 1916)

= Crafty vesper mouse =

Species of rodent in South America

The crafty vesper mouse (Calomys callidus) is a species of rodent in the family Cricetidae. It is found in Argentina and Paraguay.
