= Calomys cerqueirai =

Scientific classification
- Kingdom: Animalia
- Phylum: Chordata
- Class: Mammalia
- Order: Rodentia
- Family: Cricetidae
- Subfamily: Sigmodontinae
- Genus: Calomys
- Species: C. cerqueirai

Binomial name
- Calomys cerqueirai Bonvicino, de Oliveira, and Gentile, 2010

Species of rodent

Calomys cerqueirai is a species of rodent in the genus Calomys from southeastern Brazil. Distinct from other Calomys in its karyotype and characters of the fur, it is known only from two places in Minas Gerais. The karyotype was first described in 1996 and the species was formally named in 2010.

== Taxonomy ==
In 1996, Geise and coworkers described a new karyotypic variant of Calomys from Lagoa Santa, Minas Gerais with 36 chromosomes and a fundamental number of 66 autosomal arms (2n = 36, FNa = 66), and a 2007 genetic analysis confirmed that the new variant represents an evolutionary lineage separate from other Calomys species. In 2010, Bonvicino and others described another karyotypic variant from Capitão Andrade, also in Minas Gerais, with 2n = 38 and FNa = 66, and concluded that both karyotypic variants represented a single, previously undescribed species, which they named Calomys cerqueirai. The specific name honors Brazilian mammalogist Rui Cerqueira. A single fusion or fission event is sufficient to derive one of the two karyotypes from the other.

According to evidence from the mitochondrial cytochrome b gene, Calomys cerqueirai is sister to a group of four other species within a clade of large-bodied Calomys.

== Description ==
Calomys cerqueirai is a relatively small member of the Sigmodontinae, but is large for a Calomys. The upperparts are yellowish brown, becoming lighter towards the sides; this coloration is sharply delineated from the whitish underparts. The external ears (pinnae) are small and rounded and have a patch of white hair behind them. The tail, which is dark above and white below, is relatively short. The feet are fairly long and narrow and are covered above by white hairs. In two specimens from Capitão Andrade, the head and body length is 86 to 112 mm (3.4 to 4.4 in), the tail length is 75 to 85 mm (3.0 to 3.3 in), the hindfoot length is 21 to 22 mm (0.83 to 0.87 in), the ear length is 16 to 18 mm (0.63 to 0.71 in), and the body mass is 25 to 35 g (0.88 to 1.23 oz).

In the skull, the front region (rostrum) is short and the braincase is broadened. The incisive foramina are long, extending between the first molars. The palate itself is also long, extending beyond the third molars, and near the third molars is perforated by a pair of posterolateral palatal pits. The cutting faces of the upper incisors are inclined backwards (opisthodont). The upper third molars are reduced in size.

It differs from other Calomys by its karyotype and by characters of the fur.

== Ecology and behavior ==
The species is known from two localities in Minas Gerais, southeastern Brazil, near the border of the Atlantic Forest and Cerrado biomes. Both specimens from Capitão Andrade were caught in grass near a stream. The species is infected by species of Taenia and Hepsilon and unidentified nematodes.

== Literature cited ==
- Bonvicino, C.R., de Oliveira, J.A. and Gentile, R. 2010. A new species of Calomys (Rodentia: Sigmodontinae) from southeastern Brazil. Zootaxa 2336:19–35.
