= Large vesper mouse =

Conservation status
- Least Concern (IUCN 3.1)

Scientific classification
- Kingdom: Animalia
- Phylum: Chordata
- Class: Mammalia
- Order: Rodentia
- Family: Cricetidae
- Subfamily: Sigmodontinae
- Genus: Calomys
- Species: C. callosus

Binomial name
- Calomys callosus Rengger, 1830

Species of rodent

The large vesper mouse (Calomys callosus) is a South American rodent species of the family Cricetidae.

It is found in Argentina, Bolivia, Brazil and Paraguay.

Its karyotype has 2n = 50 and FN = 66. It was formerly synonymized with C. expulsus, but the latter has 2n = 66 and FN = 68.

It is particularly notable as the vector of Bolivian hemorrhagic fever.
