= Flexal virus =

Virus classification
- (unranked): Virus
- Realm: Riboviria
- Kingdom: Orthornavirae
- Phylum: Negarnaviricota
- Class: Bunyaviricetes
- Order: Hareavirales
- Family: Arenaviridae
- Genus: Mammarenavirus
- Species: Mammarenavirus flexalense

Synonyms
- Flexal mammarenavirus

Species of virus

Flexal virus or FLEV (and previously known by the laboratory code BeAn 293022) is a mammarenavirus: an arenavirus with a mammalian host. It was first found in semiaquatic rodents of the genus Oryzomys in tropical forest in the Pará area of Brazil.

It is a member of Clade A of the Tacaribe (or "New World") serocomplex of the family Arenaviridae. Laboratory workers infected by Flexal virus have exhibited febrile illness. Flexal virus is listed as a UN 2814 Category A infectious substance.
