= Peruvian vesper mouse =

Conservation status
- Least Concern (IUCN 3.1)

Scientific classification
- Kingdom: Animalia
- Phylum: Chordata
- Class: Mammalia
- Order: Rodentia
- Family: Cricetidae
- Subfamily: Sigmodontinae
- Genus: Calomys
- Species: C. sorellus

Binomial name
- Calomys sorellus (Thomas, 1900)

Species of rodent

The Peruvian vesper mouse (Calomys sorellus) is a species of rodent in the family Cricetidae. It is found only in Peru.
