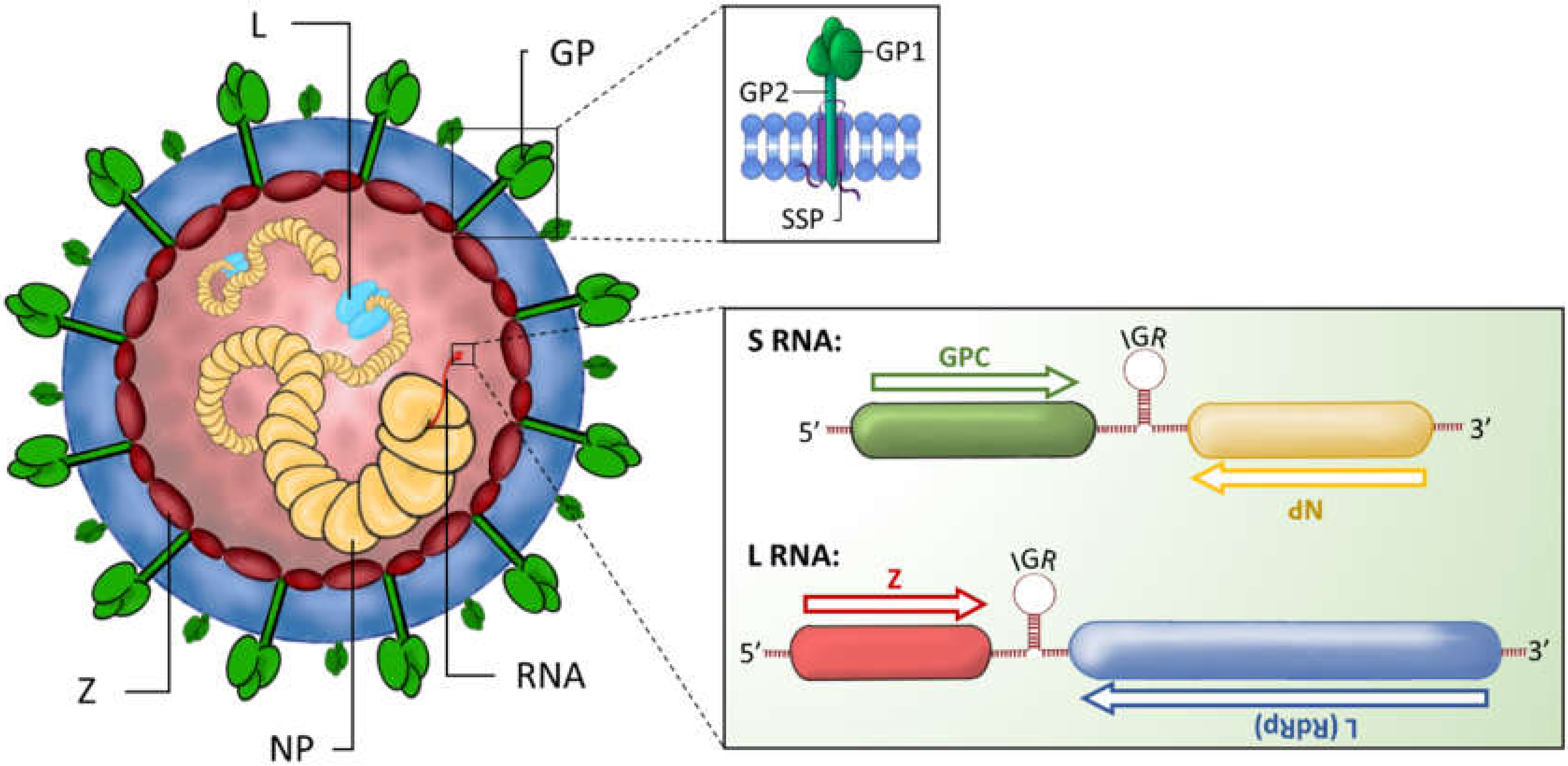
- Mammarenavirus structure and genome composition.

Virus classification
- (unranked): Virus
- Realm: Riboviria
- Kingdom: Orthornavirae
- Phylum: Negarnaviricota
- Class: Bunyaviricetes
- Order: Hareavirales
- Family: Arenaviridae
- Genus: Mammarenavirus

Species
- See text

Synonyms
- Arenavirus

= Mammarenavirus =

Genus of viruses

Mammarenavirus is a genus of viruses in the family Arenaviridae. The name is a portmanteau of mammal and the former name Arenavirus, and differentiates it from the reptile-associated Reptarenavirus. Arenavirus comes from the Latin arena (sand) for the sandy appearance of the virions.

== Taxonomy ==
The genus contains the following species, listed by scientific name and followed by the exemplar virus of the species:

- Mammarenavirus abaense, Ābà-Miányáng virus
- Mammarenavirus alashanense, Alxa virus
- Mammarenavirus allpahuayoense, Allpahuayo virus
- Mammarenavirus amapariense, Amaparí virus
- Mammarenavirus aporeense, Aporé virus
- Mammarenavirus batangense, Bātáng virus
- Mammarenavirus bearense, Bear Canyon virus
- Mammarenavirus beregaense, Berega virus
- Mammarenavirus bituense, Bitu virus
- Mammarenavirus brazilense, Sabiá virus
- Mammarenavirus caliense, Pichindé virus
- Mammarenavirus cameroonense, Souris virus
- Mammarenavirus chapareense, Chapare virus
- Mammarenavirus choriomeningitidis, Lymphocytic choriomeningitis virus
- Mammarenavirus cupixiense, Cupixi virus
- Mammarenavirus dhati-welelense, Dhati Welel virus
- Mammarenavirus flexalense, Flexal virus
- Mammarenavirus gairoense, Gairo virus
- Mammarenavirus ganziense, Gānzī virus
- Mammarenavirus guanaritoense, Guanarito virus
- Mammarenavirus ippyense, Ippy virus
- Mammarenavirus juninense, Junín virus
- Mammarenavirus kitaleense, Kitale virus
- Mammarenavirus kwanzaense, Kwanza virus
- Mammarenavirus lassaense, Lassa virus
- Mammarenavirus latinum, Latino virus
- Mammarenavirus lijiangense, Lìjiāng virus
- Mammarenavirus loeiense, Loei River virus
- Mammarenavirus lujoense, Lujo virus
- Mammarenavirus lunaense, Luna virus
- Mammarenavirus lunkense, Lunk virus
- Mammarenavirus machupoense, Machupo virus
- Mammarenavirus mafigaense, Mafiga virus
- Mammarenavirus marientalense, Mariental virus
- Mammarenavirus mecsekense, Mecsek Mountains virus
- Mammarenavirus merinoense, Merino Walk virus
- Mammarenavirus mopeiaense, Mopeia virus
- Mammarenavirus ngerengerense, Ngerengere virus
- Mammarenavirus okahandjaense, Okahandja virus
- Mammarenavirus oliverosense, Oliveros virus
- Mammarenavirus paranaense, Paraná virus
- Mammarenavirus piritalense, Pirital virus
- Mammarenavirus praomyidis, Mobala virus
- Mammarenavirus ryukyuense, Ryukyu virus
- Mammarenavirus solweziense, Solwezi virus
- Mammarenavirus songeaense, Songea virus
- Mammarenavirus tacaribeense, Tacaribe virus
- Mammarenavirus tamiamiense, Tamiami virus
- Mammarenavirus tietense, Tietê virus
- Mammarenavirus vello, Vello virus
- Mammarenavirus wenzhouense, Wēnzhōu virus
- Mammarenavirus whitewaterense, Whitewater Arroyo virus
- Mammarenavirus xapuriense, Xapuri virus
