= Mobala virus =

Virus classification
- (unranked): Virus
- Realm: Riboviria
- Kingdom: Orthornavirae
- Phylum: Negarnaviricota
- Class: Bunyaviricetes
- Order: Hareavirales
- Family: Arenaviridae
- Genus: Mammarenavirus
- Species: Mammarenavirus praomyidis

Strains
- 3076/3080 virus; 3099 virus

Synonyms
- Mobala mammarenavirus

Species of virus

Mobala virus (Mammarenavirus praomyidis) is a species of virus in the genus Mammarenavirus. It was isolated from a species of Praomys rodents in the Central African Republic.
