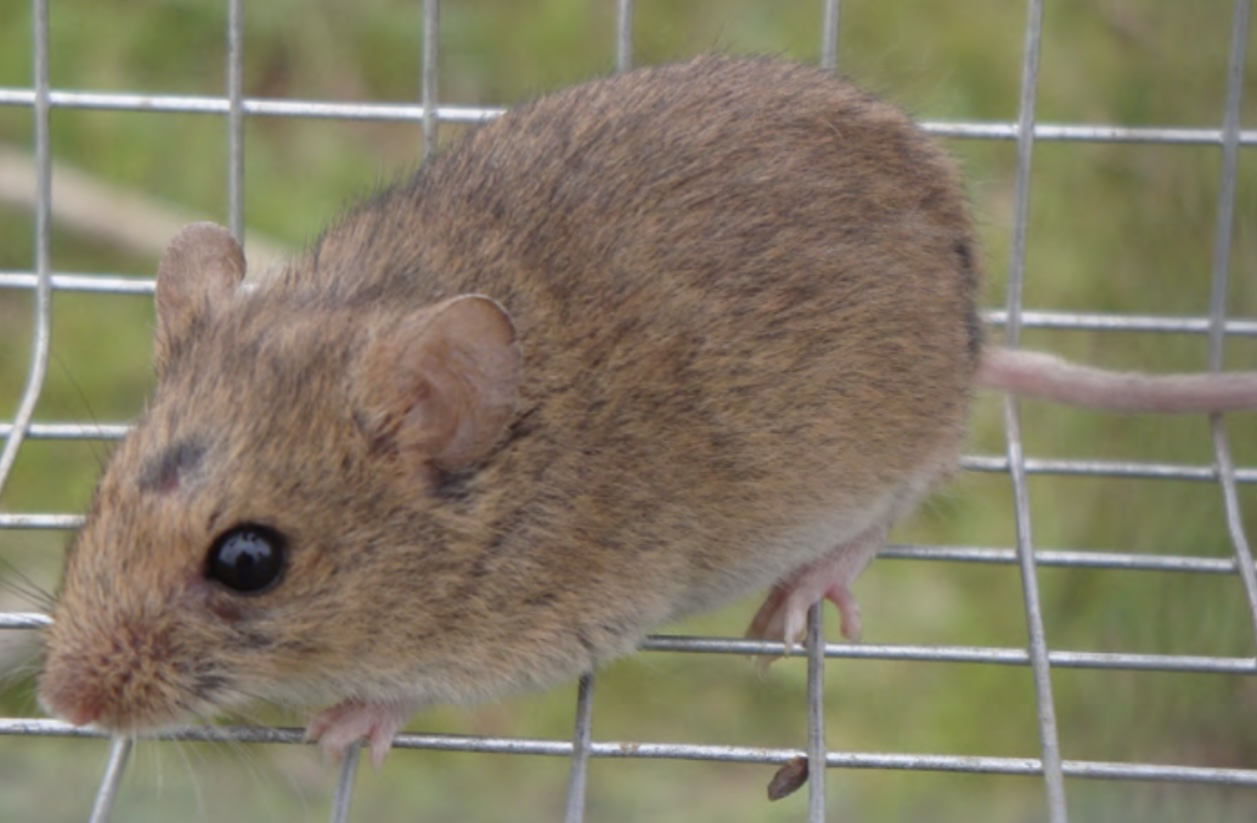

Conservation status
- Least Concern (IUCN 3.1)

Scientific classification
- Kingdom: Animalia
- Phylum: Chordata
- Class: Mammalia
- Order: Rodentia
- Family: Cricetidae
- Subfamily: Sigmodontinae
- Genus: Calomys
- Species: C. tener

Binomial name
- Calomys tener Winge, 1888

= Delicate vesper mouse =

Species of rodent

The delicate vesper mouse (Calomys tener) is a South American rodent species of the family Cricetidae. It is found in Argentina, Bolivia and Brazil. Its karyotype has 2n = 66 and FN = 66.
