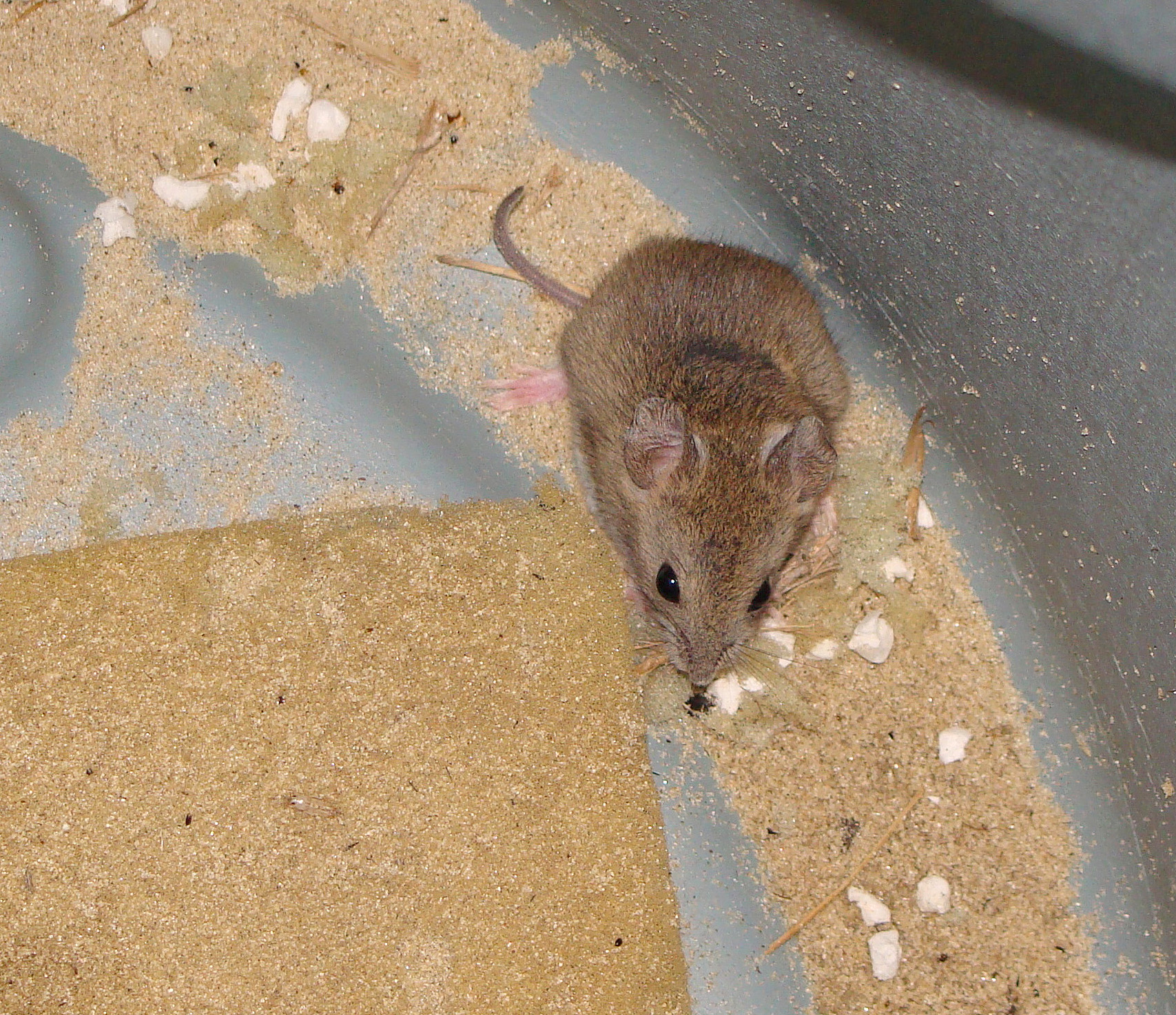

Conservation status
- Least Concern (IUCN 3.1)

Scientific classification
- Kingdom: Animalia
- Phylum: Chordata
- Class: Mammalia
- Order: Rodentia
- Family: Cricetidae
- Subfamily: Sigmodontinae
- Genus: Calomys
- Species: C. laucha

Binomial name
- Calomys laucha Fischer, 1814

= Small vesper mouse =

Species of rodent

The small vesper mouse (Calomys laucha) is a rodent species from South America. It is found in Argentina, Bolivia, Brazil, Paraguay and Uruguay. It is one of the hosts of hantavirus, causing hantavirus pulmonary syndrome.
