= Andean vesper mouse =

Conservation status
- Least Concern (IUCN 3.1)

Scientific classification
- Kingdom: Animalia
- Phylum: Chordata
- Class: Mammalia
- Order: Rodentia
- Family: Cricetidae
- Subfamily: Sigmodontinae
- Genus: Calomys
- Species: C. lepidus

Binomial name
- Calomys lepidus (Thomas, 1884)

Species of rodent

The Andean vesper mouse (Calomys lepidus) is a species of rodent in the family Cricetidae. It is found in Argentina, Bolivia, Chile, and Peru.

Andean vesper mice are typically found at high elevations in the altiplano region. Due to their location, there are very few studies about them.
