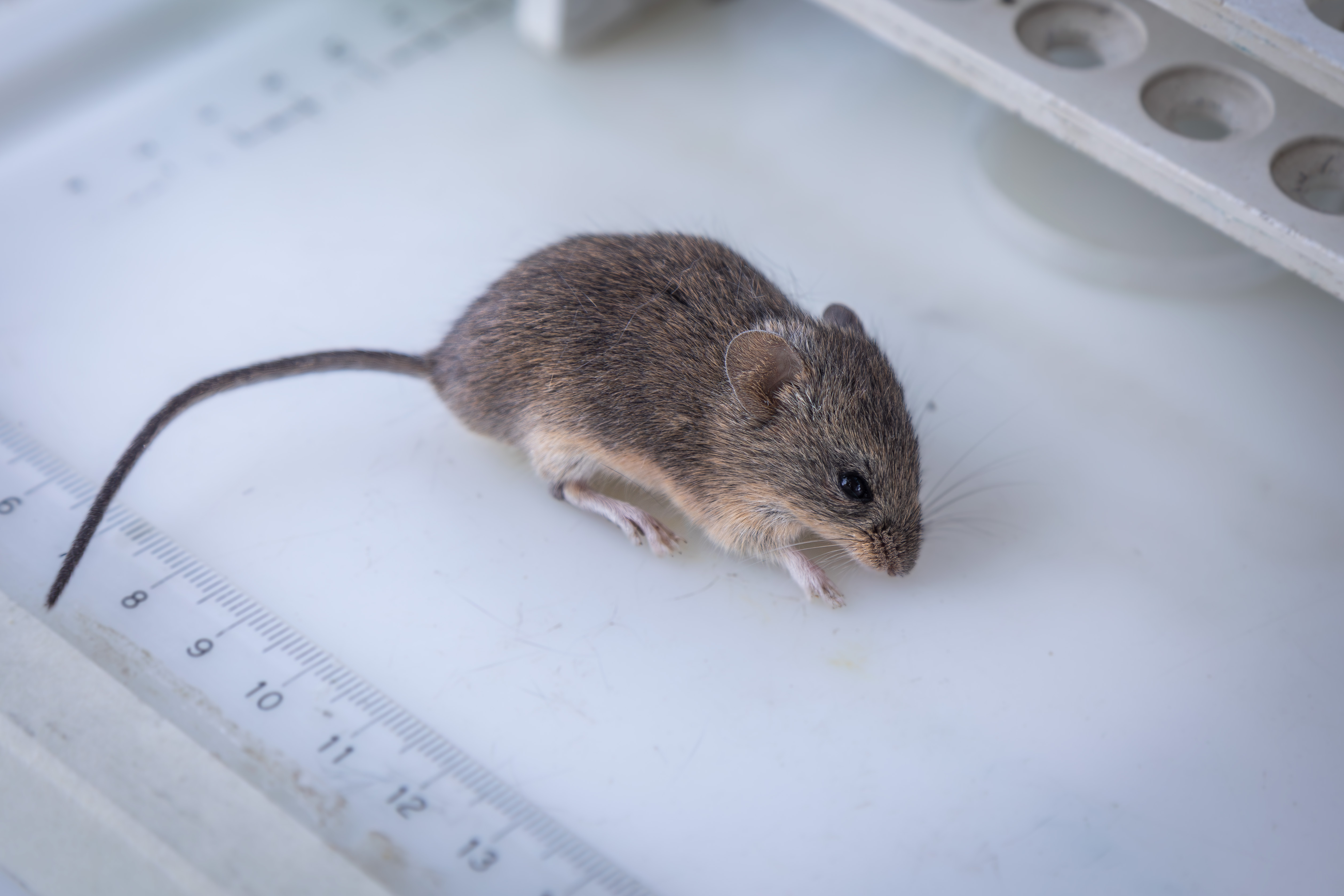

Conservation status
- Least Concern (IUCN 3.1)

Scientific classification
- Kingdom: Animalia
- Phylum: Chordata
- Class: Mammalia
- Order: Rodentia
- Family: Cricetidae
- Subfamily: Sigmodontinae
- Genus: Calomys
- Species: C. musculinus

Binomial name
- Calomys musculinus (Thomas, 1913)
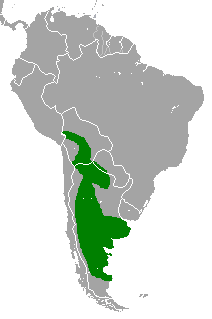
- Calomys musculinus range map

= Drylands vesper mouse =

Species of rodent

The drylands vesper mouse (Calomys musculinus) is a species of rodent in the family Cricetidae. It is found in Argentina, Bolivia and Paraguay.
