= Whitewater Arroyo virus =

Virus classification
- (unranked): Virus
- Realm: Riboviria
- Kingdom: Orthornavirae
- Phylum: Negarnaviricota
- Class: Bunyaviricetes
- Order: Hareavirales
- Family: Arenaviridae
- Genus: Mammarenavirus
- Species: Mammarenavirus whitewaterense

Synonyms
- Whitewater Arroyo mammarenavirus

Species of virus

Whitewater Arroyo virus (WWAV) is a zoonotic Arenavirus associated with hemorrhagic fever with liver failure.

== Discovery ==
WWAV is an emerging virus; previously, it was widely distributed among woodrats (Neotoma spp.), its reservoir, in the American Southwest and was not known to infect humans. However, during June 1999 – May 2000, three female patients, aged 14, 30, and 52, developed similar fatal illnesses. The illnesses were associated with nonspecific febrile symptoms including fever, headache, and myalgias and acute respiratory distress syndrome. Two developed liver failure and hemorrhagic fever. All three patients died 1–8 weeks after the onset of symptoms.

Arenavirus-specific RNA was detected in each patient using RT-PCR. The nucleotide sequence of the patients were essentially identical and was 87% similar to the WWA virus prototype strain (obtained from a white-throated woodrat (Neotoma albigula) from New Mexico in the early 1990s).

According to a family member, one patient had cleaned rodent droppings in her home during the two weeks before the onset of illness, while the other patients had no known contact with rodents. None of the patients traveled outside of California within four weeks of illness.

== Epidemiology ==
Previous cases of infection were from California. However, the virus has been found in woodrats in New Mexico and, more recently, in Utah, Oklahoma, and Texas.

== Clinical ==
WWAV infection is associated with hemorrhagic fever with liver failure. It is often associated with a mild febrile illness, with symptoms such as fever, headache, and myalgias.

== Transmission and Prevention ==
Like other arenaviruses, WWAV appears to be transmitted through rodents. Therefore, direct contact with rodents, their feces, and their nesting materials should be avoided. Surfaces contaminated with rodent feces should be disinfected. In addition, control of rodents near homes can help prevent infection. Rodent carcasses and materials should be double-bagged before disposal. Although it is unclear if WWAV can be transmitted nosocomially, other arenaviruses have been transmitted through contact with an infected patient's blood, urine, or pharyngeal secretions.
