= Bolivian vesper mouse =

Conservation status
- Least Concern (IUCN 3.1)

Scientific classification
- Kingdom: Animalia
- Phylum: Chordata
- Class: Mammalia
- Order: Rodentia
- Family: Cricetidae
- Subfamily: Sigmodontinae
- Genus: Calomys
- Species: C. boliviae

Binomial name
- Calomys boliviae (Thomas, 1901)

Species of rodent

The Bolivian vesper mouse (Calomys boliviae) is a species of rodent in the family Cricetidae. It is found in Argentina, Bolivia and perhaps Peru.
