= Córdoba vesper mouse =

Conservation status
- Least Concern (IUCN 3.1)

Scientific classification
- Kingdom: Animalia
- Phylum: Chordata
- Class: Mammalia
- Order: Rodentia
- Family: Cricetidae
- Subfamily: Sigmodontinae
- Genus: Calomys
- Species: C. venustus

Binomial name
- Calomys venustus (Thomas, 1894)

Species of rodent

The Córdoba vesper mouse or Córdoba laucha (Calomys venustus) is a South American rodent species of the family Cricetidae. It is endemic to the area of Córdoba Province, central Argentina, where it is found in the espinal (dry lowland thorn brush and grassland).
