= Chapare virus =

Species of virus

Chapare Virus
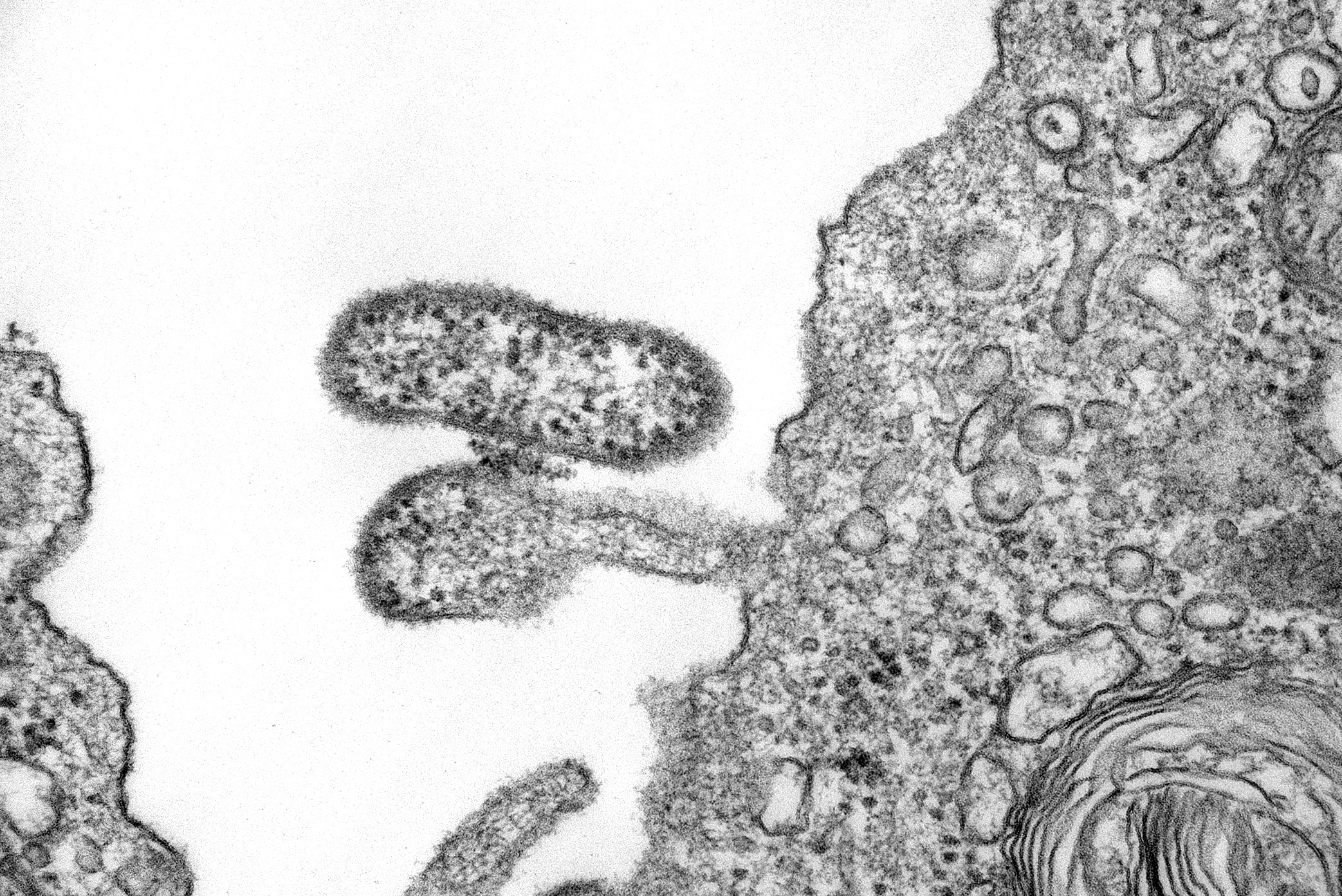
- Electron microscope image of Chapare virus

Chapare Virus, also known as CHAPV, is a virus from the family Arenaviridae that causes a hemorrhagic fever in humans known as Chapare hemorrhagic fever. It was first discovered in January 2003 after an outbreak of a novel zoonotic mammarenavirus infection, which occurred in the village of Samuzabeti, Chapare Province, Bolivia.

Like other arenaviruses that can cause hemorrhagic fever, the Chapare Virus is considered a very dangerous pathogen. Due to the highly fatal symptoms and lack of a current treatment, the virus is considered a Biosafety Level 4 (BSL4) agent.

== History ==
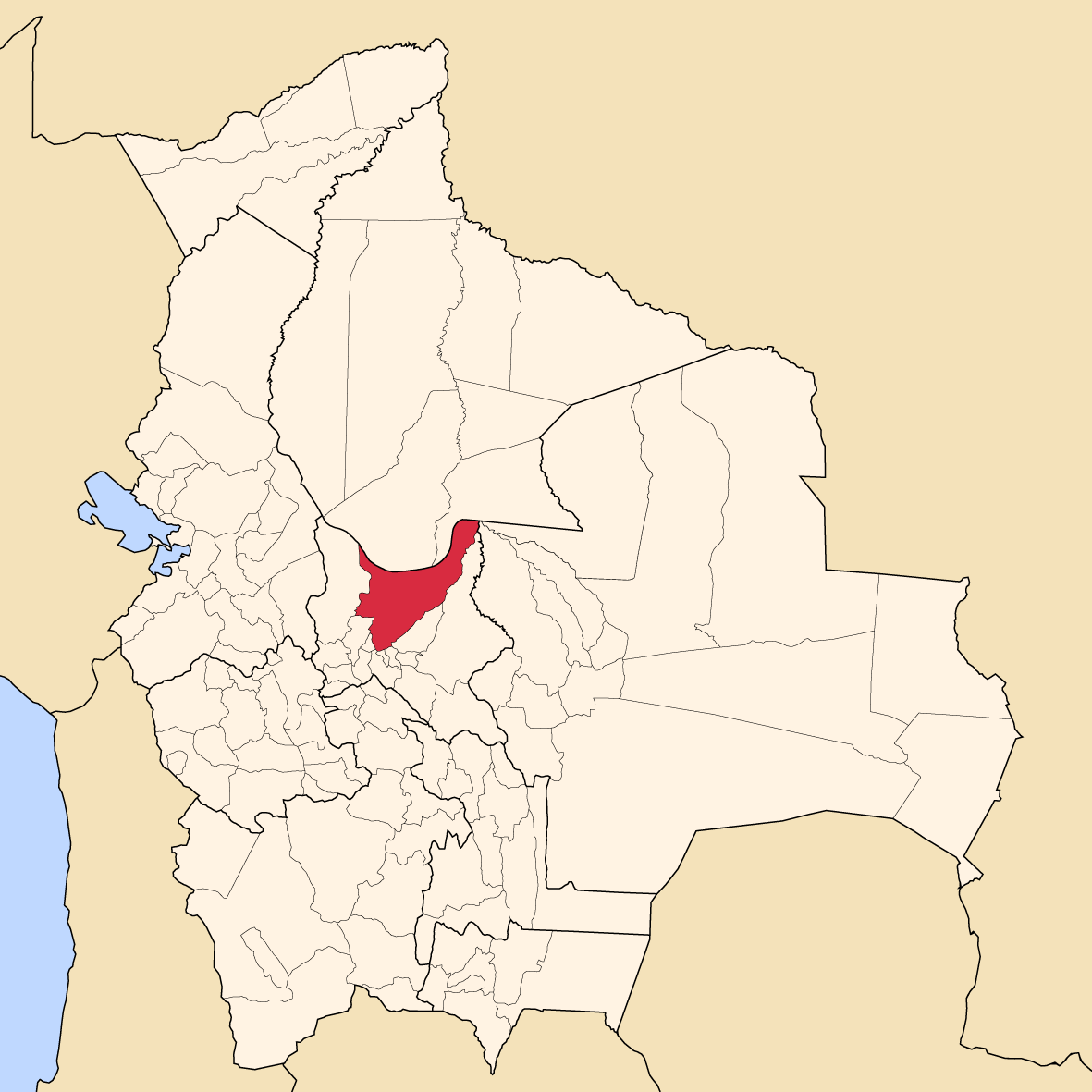
The Chapare Virus is named for the Chapare Province in Bolivia where it was discovered.

The first recorded outbreak of Chapare Virus occurred in January 2003 in Samuzabeti, a small village in a remote part of Chapare Province, Bolivia. The exact infection rate was not recorded, however, it was recorded that a small number of people were infected and one person perished. The doctors isolated viral RNA from a blood sample collected from a 22-year old victim of the infection, and termed the virus Chapare Virus after the region in which it was discovered.

=== 2019 Outbreak ===
In 2019, nine people became infected with the virus in Caranavi, La Paz, Bolivia. Nine cases and four fatalities were recorded. Health officals noted that two infections resulted from person-to-person contact between two healthcare workers treating infected individuals.

=== 2024 Outbreak ===
In December 2024, an adult male farmer from La Paz, Bolivia, sought medical treatment for symptoms of Chapare Virus on December 19th, ultimately passing away from the disease away on December 30th. The National Center of Tropical Diseases was able to confirm the presence of CHAPV from a blood sample taken before the victim's death using a polymerase-chain reaction test. Two close contacts of the infected individual were tested for the virus, and both results came back negative. Following this outbreak, no further cases have been reported as of November 2026.

== Virology ==
Chapare virus

Virus classification
- (unranked): Virus
- Realm: Riboviria
- Kingdom: Orthornavirae
- Phylum: Negarnaviricota
- Class: Bunyaviricetes
- Order: Hareavirales
- Family: Arenaviridae
- Genus: Mammarenavirus
- Species: Mammarenavirus chapareense

Synonyms
- Chapare mammarenavirus

The Chapare Virus belongs to the Arenaviridae family. Arenaviruses are typically maintained in rodent populations and tend to target macrophages and dendritic cells early on. They are split into Old World (OW) and New World (NW) complexes. These two groups are determined using multiple factors, such as geographical distribution, phylogeny, and antigenic traits. NW complexes are divided into three clades based on structure/genome, which include clades A, B, and C. CHAPV is consistent with being a member of Clade B of the NW complex. NW complexes are known to contain extremely parthenogenic species. These more pathogenic members of the NW complex, which can often be associated with an opposite response to OW complexes, express high interferon and cytokine levels. Intense immune responses are crucial, but can pose negative effects as they can cause high levels of inflammation or possible tissue damage.

=== Structure and Genome ===
Arenavirid virions are found to be typically spherical, but can also be pleomorphic, meaning they are able to present in an infected host in various forms. Their particle size and diameter can vary across members. The virions are enveloped in a dense lipid bilayer covered by glycoprotein projections, which help the virus locate and attach to host receptors and surround their own internal elements and segmented genome. When viewing with an electron microscope, arenaviruses typically appear granular due to ribosomes within the envelope that have been derived from the host cell.

The Chapare virus has an RNA genome, similar to other arenaviruses. Along with this, it also follows suit with the containment of a minigenome. This genome is able to replicate with the help of its own encoded RNA-dependent RNA polymerase (RdRp). CHAPV is also bisegmented into two RNA segments; the s segment (small) and the l segment (large). CHAPV uses an ambisense polarity coding method, meaning these segments are facing opposite directions and form a hairpin-like structure. These small and large segments are also separated by IGR regions, or noncoding intergenic regions. These regions contain RNA structures that assist in further regulating gene expression of CHAPV. The s segment encodes both a nucleoprotein and a glycoprotein precursor while the l segment encodes the RNA polymerase as well as a Z protein. The nucleoprotein functions to protect the viral RNA through binding. It also helps to assemble the ribonucleoprotein complex. The GPC forms the viral surface spikes. The RdRp is critical as humans and animals lack the ability to copy a strand of RNA directly into more RNA. The Z protein functions to coordinate assembly and release.

Though CHAPV is consistent with being a member of Clade B of the NW complex, it should not be assumed to follow the same patterns and virology as other Clade B viruses. Previous research set claims that the Chapare was believed to be a close relative of the Sabia Virus, another member of the Clade B NW complex showing hemorrhagic activity, but it proved to have its own distinctions following genetic sequencing of the two strains. Sequencing showed that the S and L sequences in each virus had noticeable differences, with the nucleotides in the L segment differing by about 30% and the S segment differing by about 26%. The Chapare virus still belongs to the New World arenavirus family, but is viewed independently across different strains. It has separate functions and genome segmentation.

== Pathophysiology ==
CHAPV falls under the New World category, which depends on Human Transferrin Receptor 1 (TfR1) for cell entry. Typically, the CHAPV particles will enter a host through inhalation. Once attachment to the host cell occurs, CHAPV is endocytosed via the clathrin-dependent pathway. The Chapare virus itself infects humans through reliance on a conserved site of human TfR1, which is typically located on the apical surface of the site. After this, viral replication and budding will occur and CHAPV will continue to circulate within the lymphatic system and increase infection in the host. It has been hypothesized that the first cell types to be infected by the virus are alveolar macrophages due to the route the infection takes to infect the host. These macrophages are then able to move to the lymph nodes, which results in migration of the virus to other tissues through the lymphatic system.

New world members of the Arenaviridae family function through the use of a tripartite glycoprotein complex, otherwise known as GPC. This is expressed through the cell envelope. Through the use of different domains, the virus can enter the receptor binding sites of compatible cells. The domains found within the GPC include a binding domain (GP1), which focuses on the receptor of the cell, a fusing domain (GP2), as well as a stable signal peptide (SSP). GP1 of the GPC can display heavy variation, allowing it to adapt to be able to recognize different receptors on host cells if needed. On the other hand, SSP and GP2 are typically conserved and regulated. Essentially, GP1 maximizes host contact, and the other portions of the GPC focus on retaining binding and fusion abilities. The GPC can have significant influences on the effects, fitness, range, and severity of the virus on the host cells, so very subtle changes should be noted when tracking infection rate of a host.

=== Metabolism ===
Viruses do not have their own mechanism for metabolism, so they will rely on their host cells to reproduce. Once a virus enters a cell, it can change the cell's metabolism to increase the production of things like nucleotides, amino acids, lipids, and ATP. These are all needed for the virus to be able to replicate genetic material and make new viral particles. These changes also help infected cells survive longer, which gives the virus more time to replicate.

== Transmission ==
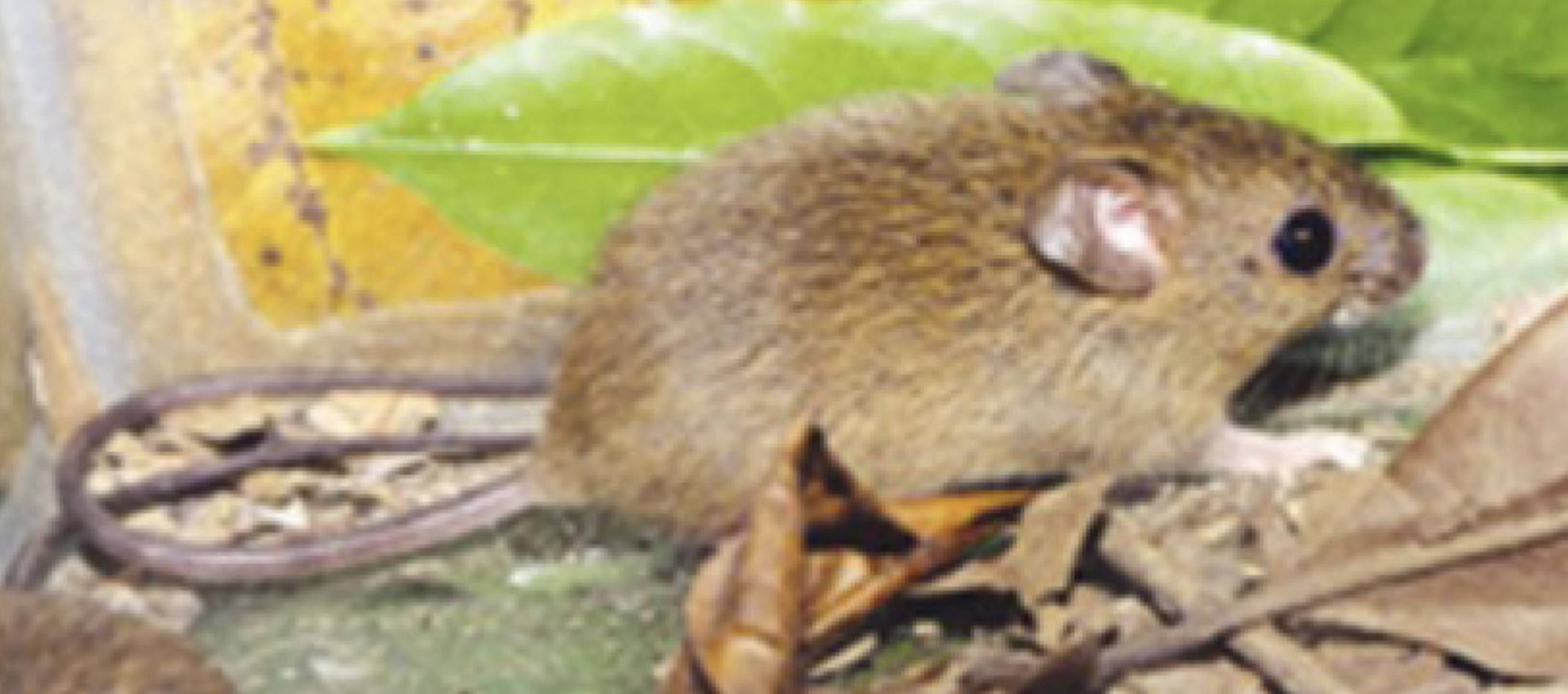
Oligoryzomys microtis is one of the key vectors of this virus.

Chapare virus is mainly spread through direct inhalation of infected bodily fluids, contaminated objects, or contact with infected rodents. It is not spread through social contact with asympomatic people. Once infected, symptoms can take up to 3 weeks to appear. Like other members of the Arenaviridae family, the specific zoonotic reservoir and primary transmission vector is suspected to be a rodent, more specifically, the small-eared pygmy rice rat. It is noted that the pathogen can remain infectious in aerosols for greater than 48 hours, meaning significant safety measures are needed to prevent transmission of this disease.

Nosocomial and human-to-human transmission of the virus is believed to have occurred in at least three past recorded cases. These resulted in the death of a medical intern and a gastroenterologist in the 2019 outbreak. However, person to person transmission of this disease is still rare, and there is currently no significant international risk.

== Symptoms ==
After an incubation period of 9–19 days, initial symptoms of CHAPV infection include fever, malaise, headache, myalgia, back pain, dizziness, nausea, vomiting and diarrhea. Progression of the disease leads to hemorrhagic and neurological symptoms, such as gingival hemorrhage, anaemia, leukopaenia, confusion, seizures, ecchymoses, bleeding from mucous membranes, hemorrhagic shock, and multi-organ failure.

Chapare virus RNA was detected in the blood, urine, conjunctiva, and semen of infected patients. It has also been detected in broncho-alveolar and nasopharyngeal samples taken from those infected. Those who have survived Chapare Virus have reported prolonged residual neurological symptoms. Viral RNA was detected in survivors up to 170 days after infection, and infectious Chapare virus was obtained in a semen sample of one patient 86 days after symptom onset.

== Clinical Management ==
=== Diagnoses ===
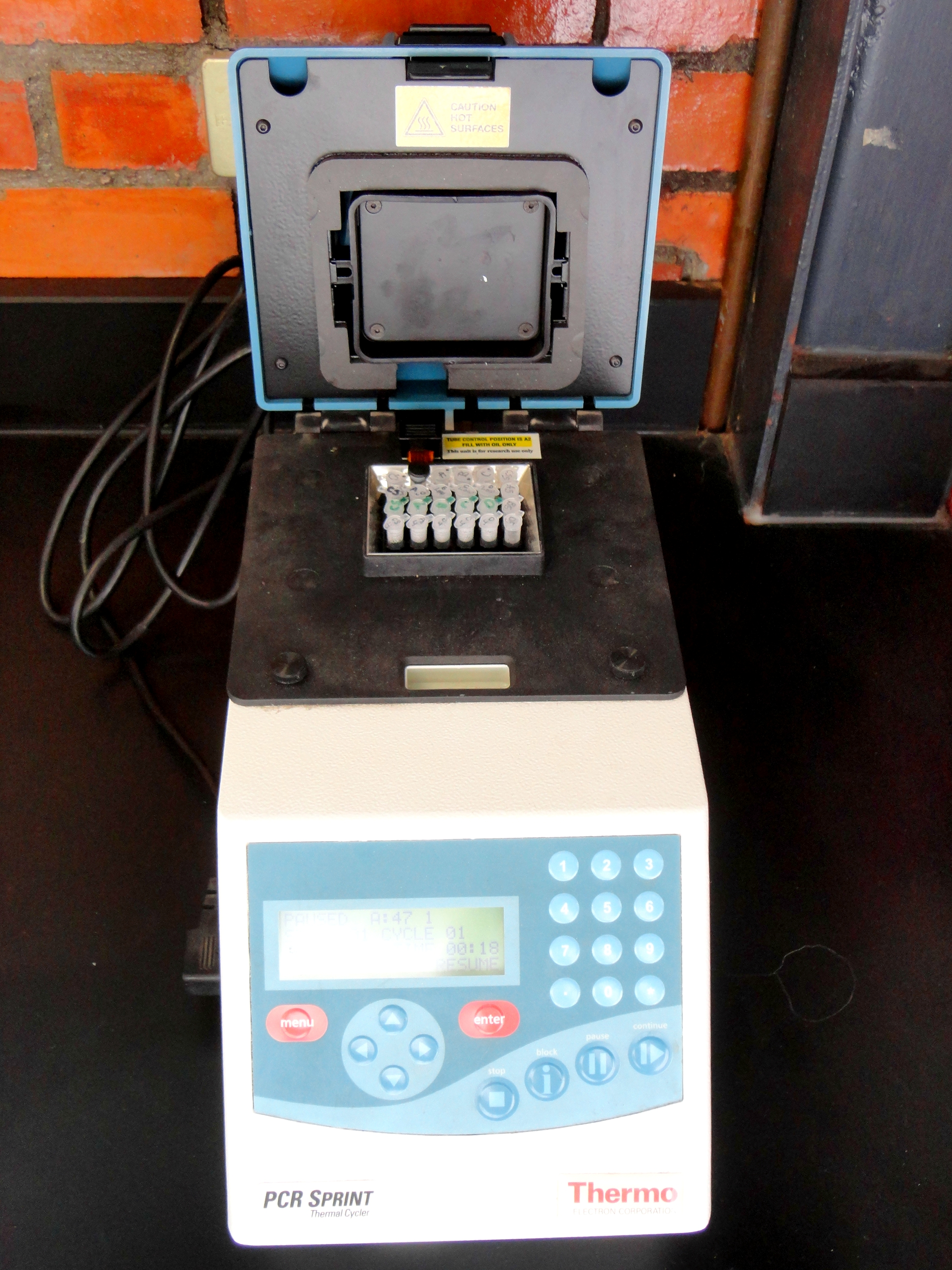
The lack of access to specialized laboratory equipment like this Thermal Cycler for Polymerase-Chain-Reaction tests is one of the reasons why confirmation of infection is difficult.

Chapare virus is not easily diagnosed, mainly due to the fact that the symptoms of this virus are similar to other regional endemic diseases such as dengue fever or yellow fever. Diagnoses confirmation is often limited by the rarity of the disease and the high-containment laboratories required. A diagnosis of Chapare Virus requires a laboratory capable of molecular diagnostics to confirm infection. To determine the presence of the virus, a laboratory can run a Polymerase Chain Reaction test. No other test is available to determine the presence of the pathogen as of September 2026.

=== Treatment ===
Successful treatment of an infection of CHAPV relies mostly on supportive care and early diagnosis. Specific antiviral therapy for Chapare virus infection has yet to be properly investigated.

Currently, there is no established protocol for the treatment of Chapare hemorrhagic fever due to its rarity and severity. Some off-label uses for anti-viral drugs have shown some effectiveness in other arenaviruses similar to Chapare, but are required to be administered early in disease progression for any real benefit. Additionally, these drugs have yet to show any efficacy towards the Chapare virus, and the hemorrhagic fever it causes. Certain animal models such as guinea pigs, which lack the signal transducer and activator of the transcription 1 protein, are susceptible to arenaviruses such as Chapare. They have been studied to identify the workings of the virus, but show signs of struggle due to their lack of availability. Though further testing is needed, studies using these guinea pigs were able to induce the Chapare Virus that showed similar signs of infection similar to humans. These models are promising in the development of a drug or vaccine for the Chapare Virus, though the rarity and safety of the virus still presents a major challenge in discovery of a viable treatment.
