= Bolivian hemorrhagic fever =

- Other names: Black typhus, ordog fever
- Specialty: Infectious disease
- Symptoms: Fever, malaise, bleeding
- Usual onset: 3–21 Days
- Causes: Machupo Virus
- Risk factors: Exposure to the Large Vesper Mouse
- Treatment: Supportive care
- Frequency: Rare, no cases since 2008
- Deaths: 20%–41% fatality rate

Bolivian hemorrhagic fever (BHF), also known as black typhus or Ordog Fever, is a hemorrhagic fever and zoonotic infectious disease endemic to Bolivia after infection by Machupo virus (MACV). The virus is spread primarily by the large vesper mouse (Calomys callosus).

BHF was first recognized in 1959 during the first reported outbreak near the city of San Joaquin in the Beni district of northeast Bolivia. Symptoms include fever, malaise, bleeding, and in some cases, death. The mortality rate is estimated at about 20% but during early outbreaks has been as high as 41%.

The most recent cases of Bolivian hemorrhagic fever occurred in February 2008. Over 200 suspected cases of BHF were reported.

== Cause ==
=== Discovery ===
Machupo virus

Virus classification
- (unranked): Virus
- Realm: Riboviria
- Kingdom: Orthornavirae
- Phylum: Negarnaviricota
- Class: Bunyaviricetes
- Order: Hareavirales
- Family: Arenaviridae
- Genus: Mammarenavirus
- Species: Mammarenavirus machupoense

Synonyms
- Machupo mammarenavirus

Machupo virus is the etiological agent of Bolivian hemorrhagic fever. The virus was first isolated in 1963 using the spleen of a diseased patient from the 1963–1964 BHF outbreak. The virus was then subsequently named after a river near the location of the outbreak.

=== Virology ===
Machupo virus is a part of the Arenaviridae family, which includes viruses like Lassa virus and Chapare virus, the latter of which was once thought to be an additional strain of Machupo. Machupo, endemic to Bolivia, is thus classified as a New World arenavirus (as it is endemic to the Americas). Arenaviruses are enveloped, single-stranded, bi-segmented, negative-sense RNA viruses. Under the electron microscope, Machupo virions are spherical and pleomorphic. They often appear 'sandy' due to their internal ribosomes.

Due to its pathogenicity and the absence of approved medical countermeasures, Machupo virus must be handled under Biosafety Level Four conditions, the highest level of biocontainment.

== Transmission ==
=== Reservoirs and vectors ===
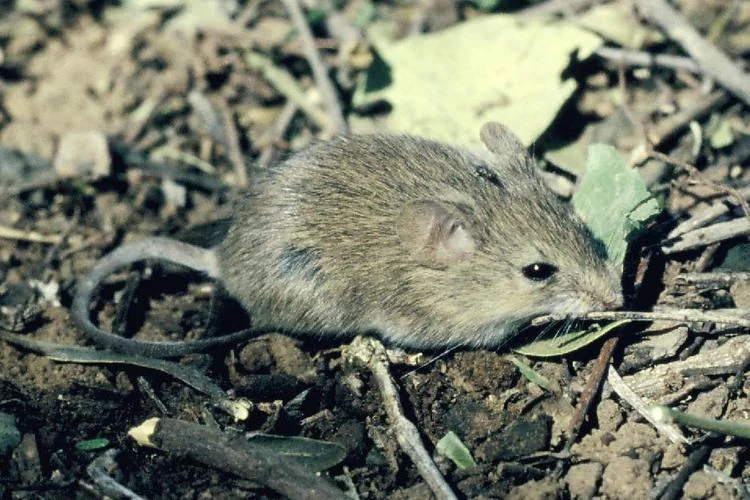
The large vesper mouse, the natural transmission vector for Bolivian hemorrhagic fever

The known primary reservoir and vector for Bolivian hemorrhagic fever is the large vesper mouse (Calomys callosus) a rodent indigenous to northern Bolivia. Infected animals are asymptomatic and shed the virus in excreta and secreta. Transmission is believed to be from contact with aerosolized particles of infected excreta or secreta to the mucosal membrane. This can be through eating contaminated food, breathing in infected particles, or the direct contact of infected particles with the mucosal membrane.

While rare, nosocomial transmission is known to occur with BHF. In 1971, three healthcare workers were infected through interhuman transmission after the admission of an infected patient.

== Symptoms ==
Bolivian hemorrhagic fever has an incubation period between 3 and 21 days with an average incubation period of 7 to 14 days. Once symptoms appear, similar to many hemorrhagic fevers, the progression of BHF is biphasic followed by a convalescence period for survivors.

=== Prodromal phase ===
The prodromal phase begins with the onset of symptoms and lasts between 1 and 5 days. The phase starts with nonspecific, flu-like symptoms including but not limited to; fever, malaise, headache, dehydration, dizziness, arthralgia, myalgia, and cough. Symptoms continue to increase in severity over the course of the prodromal phase. Late-stage prodromal phase symptoms can include; vomiting, diarrhea, abdominal pain, skin hypersensitivity, petechiae, and gingival-bleeding.

=== Hemorrhagic phase ===
One-third of patients progress into the hemorrhagic phase. This phase lasts between 2 and 10 days. The hemorrhagic phase is characterized by systemic hemorrhagic manifestations. This can present as; petechiae, gingival-bleeding, hemorrhage of mucosal membranes, subconjunctival hemorrhage, bradycardia, hypotension, pulmonary edema, tremors, spasms, delirium, and at its extreme, coma and death. Fatality typically occurs between 7 and 12 days post onset of symptoms. The mortality rate for BHF is estimated at 20%.

=== Convalescence phase ===
Of those who progress to the convalescence phase, it takes weeks to months to recover. During this phase, patients may experience weakness, hair loss, Beau's lines, rapid pulse, and dizziness.

== Treatment ==
There are currently no virus-specific FDA approved therapies for Bolivian hemorrhagic fever. Supportive care is the current recommended treatment for BHF.

=== Experimental treatments ===
Since 1963, there have been multiple experimental treatments for BHF tested on both humans and non-human primates that have been infected with Machupo.

==== Immunoglobulin ====
Immunoglobulin treatment consists of administering human immunoglobulin from a recent survivor of BHF. This serum contains antibodies to MACV. This treatment plan proves difficult as there are few survivors of BHF and of those, few are strong enough to donate the necessary plasma.

In 1975, researchers inoculated infected rhesus monkeys with human immunoglobulin. All but four of the 12 monkeys survived the initial infection. However, those with higher dosages of the immunoglobulin went on to develop a severe neurological condition that resulted in the death of three subsequent monkeys.

In 2007, immunoglobulin was administered to three patients presenting with BHF. Despite the immunoglobulin and other supportive therapies, two of the three patients died days later.

In 2008, immunoglobulin was administered to two patients presenting with BHF. One of the two patients did not survive.

==== Antivirals ====
Ribavirin, an antiviral drug, has been effectively used to treat cases of BHF, but more extensive clinical studies are necessary to fully evaluate the potential of this antiviral.

== Prevention ==
=== Vaccine ===
Currently, there is no FDA approved human vaccine for Bolivian hemorrhagic fever.

=== Pest reduction ===
Reduction of the vector species, the large vesper mouse, has been found effective at reducing the number of reported BHF cases. Prior to the identification of transmission vector, and therefore any reduction programs, Bolivia faced its largest BHF epidemic from 1963–1964. The magnitude of this epidemic is thought to have been caused by the rapid proliferation of the large vesper mouse due to the use of DDT that significantly harmed the local feline population, inhibiting them from effectively hunting the rodent populations.

However, since, the identification of the transmission vector, rodent reduction programs have been put in place by local health agencies. These include the systemic trapping and poisoning of the mice as well as the expansion of the local feline population. These efforts are believed to be responsible for the lack of BHF cases identified between 1976 and 1993.

== History ==
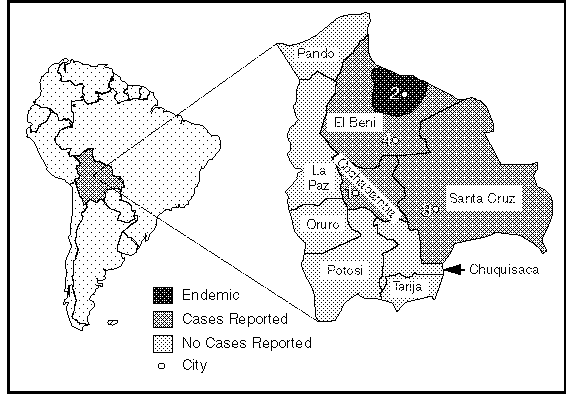
Map of Bolivia showing spread of Bolivian hemorrhagic fever

=== Outbreaks ===
==== 1959–1964 ====
This was both the first and most severe outbreak of Bolivian hemorrhagic fever. The outbreak had two major geographic origins. From 1959 to 1962, the spread was contained within the Iténez province, just west of the City of San Joaquín in Mamoré. In 1963, however, the focus of the outbreak shifted to San Joaquín as the number of cases peaked. While the number of estimated cases vary, around 984 to 1028 cases were reported with between 245 and 256 fatalities during the five year outbreak. The suspected cause of this outbreak was the proliferation of the large vesper mouse following a decrease in the feline population.

==== 1965 ====
In 1965, there were an additional 24 cases originating in San Joaquín that closely followed rodent concentration patterns.

==== 1966–1968 ====
During this period of time there was little Machupo activity. There were two suspected and 13 proven cases of BHF with zero fatalities. The cases were all from San Joaquín and its smaller surrounding villages. It is of note that this was the largest outbreak without fatalities.

==== 1969 and 1970 ====
In early 1969, there were ten cases of BHF reported with six fatalities in the town of La Cayoba outside the city of Magdalena. Residents of La Cayoba fled to Magdalena in the order to avoid the outbreak. However, in March 1969, BHF was reported in Magdalena. Through the end of 1969, 20 cases were reported in Magdalena followed by an additional 12 in 1970.

==== 1971 ====
The 1971 outbreak of BHF occurred in Cochabamba, Bolivia, a city in central Bolivia. While far from the habitat of the lineage of large vesper mice known to carry Machupo virus, patient zero had recently traveled to that area. Once back in Cochabamba, the virus was spread to two family members and three medical personnel of the hospital in which she was admitted. Of the six total people infected, there was five fatalities including patient zero. This outbreak was of serious significance due to the primary transmission of direct human to human contact and the prevalence of the disease outside of northeast Bolivia.

==== 1976–1993 ====
During this time period there were no reported cases of Bolivian hemorrhagic fever. This is believed to have been caused by rodent reduction programs or potentially underreporting.

==== 1994 ====
The 1994 outbreak began in July with a familial outbreak in Magdalena. Seven family members of an extended family became ill over the course of a month. Patient zero was the only survivor. Additionally, a lab technician handling the blood of an infected family member became infected but survived after a test tube broke. In August, there was an additional unrelated case in Magdalena that resulted in one fatality. Finally in September, an agricultural worker in Poponas was infected but survived.

==== 2007–2008 outbreak ====
In early 2007, there were at least 20 suspected cases of Bolivian hemorrhagic fever reported in Beni, including three from Magdalena in which two of the patients did not survive. Additionally, one other suspected case ended in a fatality.

In February 2008, over 200 suspected cases of BHF were reported with 12 fatalities. These cases included incidents in Huacaraje, Iténez and San Ramon, Mamoré.

==== Outbreak confusion with Chapare Virus ====
Chapare Virus (CHAPV) was first described during an outbreak near Cochabamba during December 2003 and January 2004. Originally thought to be an etiological agent of BHF along with Machupo virus, it is now considered to be significantly genetically distinct and the etiological agent of Chapare hemorrhagic fever (CHHF). However, this has led to confusion of what is and is not a BHF outbreak. Some sources may show BHF cases beyond 2000 that are now understood to be CHHF rather than BHF including the 2003-2004, 2019, and 2020 outbreaks.

=== Weaponization ===
Due to its high lethality, Bolivian hemorrhagic fever was one of three hemorrhagic fevers and one of more than a dozen agents that the United States researched as potential biological weapons before the nation suspended its biological weapons program in 1969. During this program, Albert Nickel, a 53-year old animal caretaker at Fort Detrick, died in 1964 from BHF after being bitten by an infected mouse. Nickel Place, on Fort Detrick, is named in his honor. BHF was also being researched by the Soviet Union, under the Biopreparat bureau.
