= Tick-borne disease =

- Specialty: Infectious disease

Tick-borne diseases, which afflict humans and other animals, are caused by infectious agents transmitted by tick bites. They are caused by infection with a variety of pathogens, including rickettsia and other types of bacteria, viruses, and protozoa. The economic impact of tick-borne diseases is considered to be substantial in humans, and tick-borne diseases are estimated to affect ~80 % of cattle worldwide. Most of these pathogens require passage through vertebrate hosts as part of their life cycle. Tick-borne infections in humans, farm animals, and companion animals are primarily associated with wildlife animal reservoirs. Many tick-borne infections in humans involve a complex cycle between wildlife animal reservoirs and tick vectors. The survival and transmission of these tick-borne viruses are closely linked to their interactions with tick vectors and host cells. These viruses are classified into different families, including Asfarviridae, Reoviridae, Rhabdoviridae, Orthomyxoviridae, Bunyaviridae, and Flaviviridae.

The occurrence of ticks and tick-borne illnesses in humans is increasing. Tick populations are spreading into new areas, in part due to climate change. Tick populations are also affected by changes in the populations of their hosts (e.g. deer, cattle, mice, lizards) and those hosts' predators (e.g. foxes). Diversity and availability of hosts and predators can be affected by deforestation and habitat fragmentation.

Because individual ticks can harbor more than one disease-causing agent, patients can be infected with more than one pathogen at the same time, compounding the difficulty in diagnosis and treatment. As the incidence of tick-borne illnesses increases and the geographic areas in which they are found expand, health workers increasingly must be able to distinguish the diverse, and often overlapping, clinical presentations of these diseases.

As of 2020, 18 tick-borne pathogens have been identified in the United States according to the Centers for Disease Control and Prevention and at least 27 are known globally. New tick-borne diseases have been discovered in the 21st century, due in part to the use of molecular assays and next-generation sequencing.

== Prevention ==
=== Exposure ===
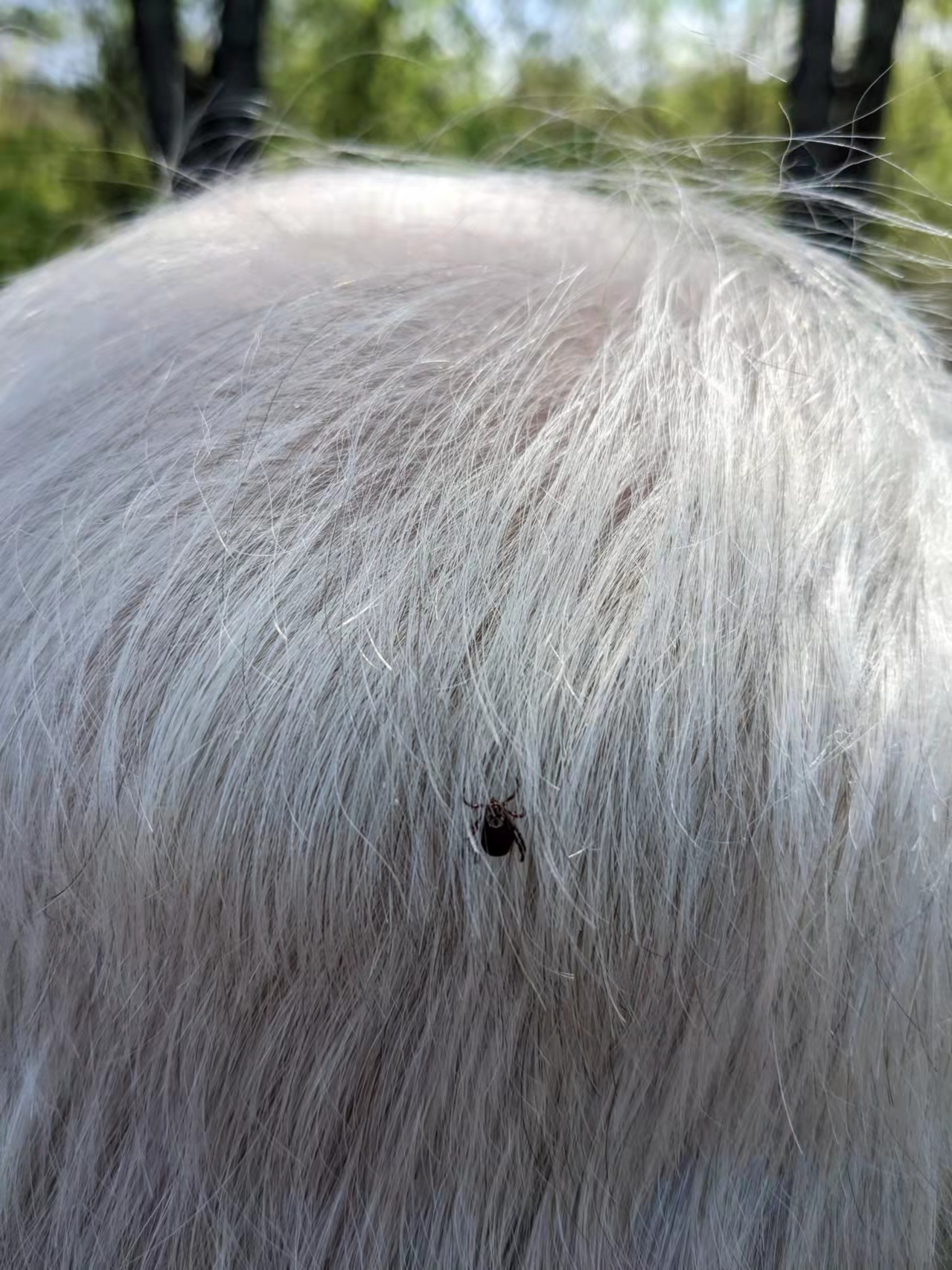
A tick crawling on a human head in a wooded area near LeRoy, Michigan

Ticks tend to be more active during warmer months, though this varies by geographic region and climate. Areas with woods, bushes, high grass, or leaf litter are likely to have more ticks. People can limit their exposure to tick bites by wearing light-colored clothing (including pants and long sleeves), using insect repellent with 20%–30% N,N-Diethyl-3-methylbenzamide (DEET), tucking their pants legs into their socks, checking for ticks frequently, and washing and drying their clothing in a hot dryer.

According to the World Health Organization, tick-to-animal transmission is difficult to prevent because animals do not show visible symptoms; the only effective prevention relies on killing ticks on the livestock production facility.

=== Signs and symptoms ===
Ticks also have the potential to induce a motor illness characterized by acute, ascending flaccid paralysis. This condition can be fatal if not treated promptly, affecting both humans and animals. It is mainly associated with certain species of ticks. Symptoms typically range from fatigue, numbness in the legs, muscle aches, and, in some cases, paralysis and other severe neurological manifestations.

Tick-borne diseases (TBD) are a major health threat in the US. The number of pathogens and the burden of disease have been increasing over the last couple of decades. With improved diagnostics and surveillance, new pathogens are regularly identified, bettering the understanding of TBDs. However, diagnosis of these illnesses remains a challenge, with many TBDs presenting with similar nonspecific symptoms and diagnosis requiring a battery of assays to assess patients adequately. New advanced molecular diagnostic methods, including next-generation sequencing and metagenomics analysis, promise improved detection of novel and emerging pathogens with the ability to detect a litany of potential pathogens with a single assay.

=== Tick removal ===
Ticks should be removed safely as soon as possible once discovered. They can be removed either by grasping tweezers as close to the mouth as possible and pulling without rotation; some companies market grooved tools that rotate the hypostome to facilitate removal. Chemical methods to make the tick self-detach are not efficient. In Australia and New Zealand, where tick-borne infections are less common than tick reactions, the Australasian Society of Clinical Immunology and Allergy recommends seeking medical assistance or killing ticks in-situ by freezing and then leaving them to fall out to prevent allergic/anaphylactic reactions.

== Diagnosis ==
Diagnosing tick-borne diseases involves a dual approach. Some diagnoses rely on clinical observations and symptom analysis, while others are confirmed through laboratory tests. Ticks can transmit a wide range of viruses, many of which are arboviruses. In general, specific laboratory tests are not available for the rapid diagnosis of tick-borne diseases. Due to their seriousness, antibiotic treatment is often justified based on clinical presentation alone.

Diagnosing Lyme borreliosis relies on clinical criteria, with a history of a tick bite and associated symptoms being crucial. Laboratory diagnosis follows a 'two-tiered diagnostic protocol,' involving detecting specific antibodies using methods such as immunoenzymatic assays and Western blot tests, preferably with recombinant antigens. While ELISA and Western blot have similar sensitivity, Western blot is more specific due to the identification of specific immunoreactive bands. Seroconversion typically occurs around two weeks after symptom onset, but false-positive ELISA results can be linked to poorly reactive antibodies against specific antigens, especially in patients with other infectious and non-infectious diseases.

Tick-borne encephalitis (TBE) presents non-specific clinical features, making laboratory diagnosis crucial. The diagnostic process typically involves identifying specific IgM- and IgG-serum antibodies through enzyme-linked immunosorbent assay (ELISA) since these antibodies are detectable in most cases upon hospitalization.

== Treatment ==
Patients with Lyme disease who are treated with appropriate antibiotics usually recover rapidly and completely. Antibiotics commonly used include doxycycline, amoxicillin, or cefuroxime axetil. For Anaplasmosis, ehrlichiosis, and Rocky Mountain Spotted Fever, Doxycycline is the first-line treatment for adults and children of all ages. For babesiosis, a combination therapy with atovaquone and azithromycin is most commonly recommended for the treatment of mild to moderate babesiosis. Treatment is usually continued for 7 to 10 days. A combination regimen of oral clindamycin and quinine has also been proven effective, but the rate of adverse reactions is significantly higher with this combination. For the Powassan virus, there are no medications for treating Powassan virus infections. Medications, however, can help to relieve symptoms and prevent complications. People with severe disease are typically treated in a hospital where they may be given intravenous fluids, fever-reducing medications, breathing support, and other therapies as needed.

== Assessing risk ==
For a person or pet to acquire a tick-borne disease requires that the individual gets bitten by a tick and that the tick feeds for a sufficient period of time. The feeding time required to transmit pathogens differs for different ticks and different pathogens. Transmission of the bacterium that causes Lyme disease is well understood to require a substantial feeding period. In general, soft ticks (Argasidae) transmit pathogens within minutes of attachment because they feed more frequently, whereas hard ticks (Ixodidae) take hours or days, but the latter are more common and harder to remove.

For an individual to acquire an infection, the feeding tick must also be infected. Not all ticks are infected. In most places in the US, 30-50% of deer ticks will be infected with Borrelia burgdorferi (the agent of Lyme disease). Other pathogens are much rarer. Ticks can be tested for infection using a highly specific and sensitive qPCR procedure. Several commercial labs provide this service to individuals for a fee. The Laboratory of Medical Zoology (LMZ), a nonprofit lab at the University of Massachusetts, provides a comprehensive TickReport for a variety of human pathogens and makes the data available to the public. Those wishing to know the incidence of tick-borne diseases in their town or state can search the LMZ surveillance database.

== Examples ==
Major tick-borne diseases include:

=== Bacterial ===
- Lyme disease or borreliosis
  - Organism: Borrelia burgdorferi sensu lato (bacterium)
  - Vectors: at least 15 species of ticks in the genus Ixodes, including deer tick (Ixodes scapularis (=I. dammini), I. pacificus, I. ricinus (Europe), I. persulcatus (Asia)). Additionally, Haemaphysalis punctata.
  - Endemic to: The Americas and Eurasia
  - Symptoms: Fever, arthritis, neuroborreliosis, erythema migrans, cranial nerve palsy, carditis, fatigue, and influenza-like illness
  - Treatment: Antibiotics – amoxicillin in pregnant adults and children, doxycycline in other adults
- Relapsing fever (tick-borne relapsing fever, different from Lyme disease due to different Borrelia species and ticks)
  - Organisms: Borrelia species such as B. hermsii, B. parkeri, B. duttoni, B. miyamotoi
  - Vector: Ornithodoros species
  - Regions: Primarily in Africa, Spain, Saudi Arabia, Asia in and certain areas of Canada and the western United States
  - Symptoms: Relapsing fever typically presents as recurring high fevers, flu-like symptoms, headaches, and muscular pain, with less common symptoms including rigors, joint pain, altered mentation, cough, sore throat, painful urination, and rash
  - Treatment: Antibiotics are the treatment for relapsing fever, with doxycycline, tetracycline, or erythromycin being the treatment of choice.
- Typhus Several diseases caused by Rickettsia bacteria (below)
- Rocky Mountain spotted fever
  - Organism: Rickettsia rickettsii
  - Vector/Region: Wood tick (Dermacentor variabilis), Dermacentor andersoni in USA: East, Southwest
  - Vector/Region: Amblyomma sculptum (formerly Amblyomma cajennense) in Brazil: São Paulo, Rio de Janeiro, Minas Gerais
  - Symptoms: Fever, headache, altered mental status, myalgia, rash, palsy, and necrosis
  - Treatment: Antibiotic therapy, typically consisting of doxycycline or tetracycline.
- Helvetica spotted fever
  - Organism: Rickettsia helvetica
  - Region (R. helvetica): Confirmed common in ticks in Sweden, Switzerland, France, and Laos
  - Vector/region(s): Ixodes ricinus is the main European vector.
  - Symptoms: Most often small red spots, other symptoms are fever, muscle pain, headache, and respiratory problems
  - Treatment: Broad-spectrum antibiotic therapy is needed, phenoxymethylpenicillin likely is sufficient.
- Human granulocytic anaplasmosis (formerly human granulocytic ehrlichiosis or HGE)
  - Organism: Anaplasma phagocytophilum (formerly Ehrlichia phagocytophilum or Ehrlichia equi)
  - Vector: Lone star tick (Amblyomma americanum), I. scapularis
  - Region (US): South Atlantic, South-central
- Bartonella: Bartonella transmission rates to humans via tick bite are not well established but Bartonella is common in ticks. For example: 4.76% of 2100 ticks tested in a study in Germany
- Tularemia
  - Organism: Francisella tularensis, A. americanum
  - Vector: D. variabilis, D. andersoni
  - Region (US): Southeast, South-central, West, widespread

=== Viral ===
- Tick-borne meningoencephalitis
  - Organism: TBEV (FSME) virus, a flavivirus from family Flaviviridae
  - Vector: deer tick (Ixodes scapularis), Ixodes ricinus (Europe), Ixodes persulcatus (Russia + Asia))
  - Endemic to: Europe (including now the UK; in 2020 Public Health England announced the first two TBE cases contracted within the country) and northern Asia
- Powassan virus/deer tick virus
  - Organism: Powassan virus (POWV), a flavivirus from family Flaviviridae. Lineage 2 POWV is also known as deer tick virus (DTV)
  - Vector: Ixodes cookei, Ix. scapularis, Ix. marxi, Ix. spinipalpusm, Dermacentor andersoni, and D. variabilis
  - Endemic to: North America and eastern Russia
- Colorado tick fever
  - Organism: Colorado tick fever virus (CTF), a coltivirus from the Reoviridae
  - Vector: Dermacentor andersoni
  - Region: US (West)
- Crimean-Congo hemorrhagic fever
  - Organism: CCHF virus, a nairovirus, from the Bunyaviridae
  - Vector: Hyalomma marginatum, Rhipicephalus bursa
  - Region: Southern part of Asia, Northern Africa, Southern Europe
- Severe febrile illness
  - Organism: Heartland virus, a phlebovirus, from the Bunyaviridae
  - Vector: Lone star tick (Amblyomma americanum)
  - Region: Missouri and Tennessee, United States
- Severe febrile illness, headaches, coma in 1/3 patients
  - Organism: tentatively Alongshan virus, Jingmen virus group in the Flavivirus family
  - Vector: tick (likely Ixodes persulcatus, Ixodes ricinus), mosquitoes
  - Region: Inner Mongolia, but potentially more widespread

=== Protozoan ===
- Babesiosis
  - Organism: Babesia microti, Theileria equi
  - Vector: Ixodes scapularis (deer tick), I. pacificus (western black-legged tick)
  - Region (US): Northeast, West Coast
- Cytauxzoonosis
  - Organism: Cytauxzoon felis
  - Vector: Amblyomma americanum (Lone star tick)
  - Region (US): South, Southeast

=== Toxin ===
- Tick paralysis
  - Cause: Toxin
  - Vector (US): Dermacentor andersoni (Rocky Mountain wood tick), D. variabilis (American dog tick or wood tick)
  - Region (US): D. andersoni: East, D. variabilis: East, West coast
  - Vector (Australia): Ixodes holocyclus (Australian paralysis tick)
  - Region (Australia): East

=== Allergies ===
- Alpha-gal allergy - Alpha-gal syndrome is likely caused by a hypersensitivity reaction to the Alpha-gal (Galactose-alpha-1,3-galactose) sugar molecule introduced by ticks while feeding on a human host. The immune reaction can leave people with an allergy to red meat and other mammalian-derived products.
- The experimental confirmation and investigation of how tick bites contribute to the development of AGS have been established and examined using a mouse model.

== See also ==
- Arbovirus
- Climate change and infectious diseases
- List of diseases spread by invertebrates
- List of insect-borne diseases
- Mosquito-borne disease
- Robovirus
- Tibovirus
- Wetland virus
- Ticks of domestic animals
