= List of diseases spread by arthropods =

Diseases spread by arthropods
- Type: Vector-borne infectious diseases
- Vectors: Mosquitoes · ticks · fleas · lice · sandflies · mites · tsetse flies · blackflies
- Causative agents: Viruses, bacteria, protozoa, helminths, rickettsia
- Notable diseases: Malaria · Dengue fever · Lyme disease · Yellow fever · Plague · Typhus · Leishmaniasis · Chagas disease · Zika · Chikungunya · West Nile fever
- Global burden: Hundreds of millions of cases annually; malaria alone caused ~249 million cases in 2022 (WHO)
- Host range: Humans and other vertebrates
- Classification: Arthropod-borne disease (arboviral and non-arboviral)

Arthropods are common vectors of disease. A vector is an organism which spreads disease-causing parasites or pathogens from one host to another. Invertebrates spread bacterial, viral and protozoan pathogens by two main mechanisms. Either via their bite, as in the case of malaria spread by mosquitoes, or via their faeces, as in the case of Chagas' Disease spread by Triatoma bugs or epidemic typhus spread by human body lice.

Many invertebrates are responsible for transmitting diseases. Mosquitoes are perhaps the best known invertebrate vector and transmit a wide range of tropical diseases including malaria, dengue fever and yellow fever. Another large group of vectors are flies. Sandfly species transmit the disease leishmaniasis, by acting as vectors for protozoan Leishmania species, and tsetse flies transmit protozoan trypansomes (Trypanosoma brucei gambiense and Trypansoma brucei rhodesiense) which cause African Trypanosomiasis (sleeping sickness). Ticks and lice form another large group of invertebrate vectors. The bacterium Borrelia burgdorferi, which causes Lyme Disease, is transmitted by ticks and members of the bacterial genus Rickettsia are transmitted by lice. For example, the human body louse transmits the bacterium Rickettsia prowazekii which causes epidemic typhus.

Although invertebrate-transmitted diseases pose a particular threat on the continents of Africa, Asia and South America, there is one way of controlling invertebrate-borne diseases, which is by controlling the invertebrate vector. For example, one way of controlling malaria is to control the mosquito vector through the use of mosquito nets, which prevent mosquitoes from coming into contact with humans.

== Diseases ==
Disease	Vector	Causative organism	Host	Symptoms	Area	Treatment
African horse sickness	Culicoid midge	Orbivirus (virus)	Equids	Fever, lung, heart or mucous membrane symptoms.	Europe, Africa	Vaccination
African trypanosomiasis (sleeping sickness)	Tsetse fly	Trypanosoma brucei (protozoan)	Wild mammals, cattle, human	Fever, joint pain, swollen lymph nodes, sleep disturbances	Sub-Saharan Africa	Various drugs
Babesiosis	Tick	Babesia (protozoan)	Humans, rodents, dogs, cattle	Fever, hemolytic anemia, chills, sweating, thrombocytopenia	South Europe, Central United States	Antibiotics
Bluetongue disease	Culicoid midge	Orbivirus (virus)	Cattle, sheep	Fever, salivation, swelling of face and tongue	Europe, Africa	Vaccination
Chagas disease (American trypanosomiasis)	Various assassin bugs of subfamily Triatominae	Trypanosoma cruzi (protozoan)		Mild symptoms, then chronic heart or brain inflammation	Central and South America	Antiparasitic drugs; treatment of symptoms
Chikungunya	Mosquito	Chikungunya virus	Human	Abdomen pain, eye pain, joint pain, muscle pain, fever, chills, fatigue, headache, skin rash	Asia	Antibiotics
Crimean–Congo hemorrhagic fever	Tick	Crimean–Congo hemorrhagic fever	Human Dog Cat	Fever, muscle ache, dizziness, neck pain, backache, headache, sore eyes and photophobia (sensitivity to light)	Africa Eastern Europe Worldwide	Gloves, Long sleeves, and pants Avoiding contact with body fluids
Dengue fever	Mosquito	Flavivirus (virus)		Fever then arthritis	(Sub) tropics and South Europe	Observation/supportive treatment
Dirofilariasis	Mosquito	Dirofilaria	Dogs, wolves, coyotes, foxes, jackals, cats, seals, sea lions, muskrats, bears, rabbits, raccoons, reptiles, beavers, ferrets, monkeys,	Chest pain, fever, pleural effusion, cough, nodules under the skin or lung granulomas	Worldwide	Heartworm medicine
Tick-borne encephalitis	Tick	Tick-borne encephalitis virus		Ill with flu then meningitis	Central and North Europe	prevention and vaccination
Heartland virus disease	Tick	Heartland virus		Fever, lethargy, headache, myalgia, diarrhea, nausea, loss of appetite, anorexia, thrombocytopenia, leukopenia, arthralgia	Missouri and Tennessee, USA	Supportive treatment
Leishmaniasis	Sandfly	Leishmania (protozoan)		Fever, damage to the spleen and liver, and anaemia	South hemisphere and Mediterranean Countries	Treatment of infected
Lyme disease	Tick	Borrelia burgdorferi (bacterium)	Deer, human	Bull's-eye pattern skin rash around bite, fever, chills, fatigue, body aches, headache, joint pain. Sometimes neurological problems.	Europe, North Africa, and North America	Prevention and antibiotics
Lymphatic filariasis	Mosquito	Wuchereria bancrofti	Human	Fever, swelling of limbs, breasts, or genitalia	Africa, Asia.	Various drugs
Malaria	Mosquito	Plasmodium (protist)	Human	Headache then heavy fever	(Sub) tropics	Prevention and anti-malaria
Plague	Flea	Yersinia pestis	Rats, Human	Fever, weakness and headache. In the bubonic form there is also swelling of lymph nodes, while in the septicemic form tissues may turn black and die, and in the pneumonic form shortness of breath, cough and chest pain may occur	Central Asia, India, US, Africa, Peru, Brazil	Antibiotics
Pogosta disease Synonyms: Karelian fever Ockelbo disease Sindbis fever	Mosquito	Sindbis virus		Skin rash, fever, in severe cases - arthritis	Scandinavia, France, Russia	unknown
Rickettsial diseases: Typhus rickettsialpox Boutonneuse fever African tick bite fever Rocky Mountain spotted fever etc.	Tick, mite, lice	Rickettsia species (bacteria)		Fever with bleeding around the bite	Global	Prevention and antibiotics
Tularemia	Deer flies, ticks	Francisella tularensis (bacterium)	Birds, lagomorphs, rodents	Skin ulcer, swollen and painful lymph glands, fever, chills headache, exhaustion	North America	Streptomycin, gentamicin, doxycycline, ciprofloxacin
West Nile fever	Mosquito	West Nile virus	Birds, human	Fever, headaches, skin rash, body aches.	Africa, Asia, North America, South and East Europe	None
Yellow fever	Mosquito	Yellow fever virus	Human	Muscle pain, abdomen pain, loss of appetite, fatigue, jaundice, fever, chills, headache, nausea, vomiting, bleeding, delirium	South America, Africa	Yellow fever vaccine
Zika fever	Mosquito	Zika virus	Monkeys, human	Fever, eye pain, conjunctivitis, rash, headache, vomiting, joint pain, muscle pain, fatigue, chills, sweating, loss of appetite	South America, Mexico, Asia, Africa	Decreasing mosquito bites, condoms

== See also ==
- Arbovirus
- Climate change and infectious diseases
- List of cutaneous conditions
- List of insect-borne diseases
- List of parasites (human)
- Mosquito-borne disease
- Robovirus
- Tibovirus
- Tick-borne disease
