= Arbovirus =

Class of viruses which are transmitted by arthropods

Arbovirus infection
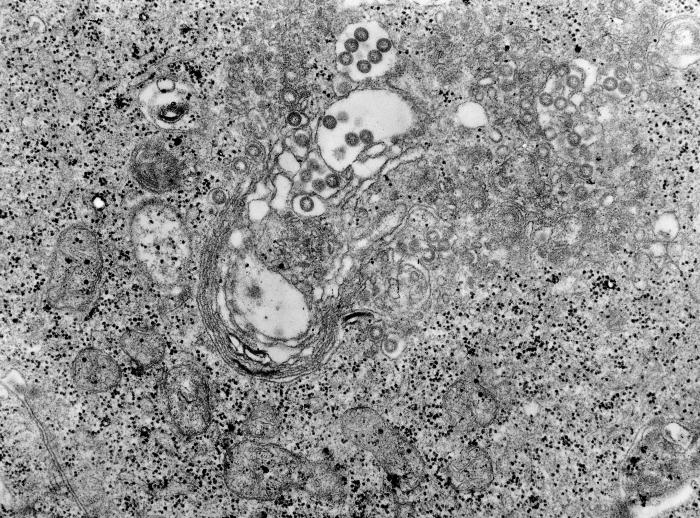
- Tissue infected with the Rift Valley fever virus
- Specialty: Infectious disease

Arbovirus is an informal name for any virus that is transmitted by arthropod vectors. The term arbovirus is a portmanteau word (arthropod-borne virus). Tibovirus (tick-borne virus) is sometimes used to more specifically describe viruses transmitted by ticks, a superorder within the arthropods. Arboviruses can affect both animals (including humans) and plants. In humans, symptoms of arbovirus infection usually occur 3–15 days after exposure to the virus and last three or four days. The most common clinical features of infection are fever, headache, and malaise, but other features of viral hemorrhagic fever syndrome and encephalitis may also occur.

== Signs and symptoms ==
The incubation period – the time between when infection occurs and when symptoms appear – varies from virus to virus, but is usually limited between 2 and 15 days for arboviruses. The majority of infections, however, are asymptomatic. Among cases in which symptoms do appear, symptoms tend to be non-specific, resembling a flu-like illness, and are not indicative of a specific causative agent. These symptoms include fever, headache, malaise, rash and fatigue. Rarely, vomiting and hemorrhagic fever may occur. The central nervous system can also be affected by infection, as encephalitis and meningitis are sometimes observed. Prognosis is good for most people, but is poor in those who develop severe symptoms, with up to a 20% mortality rate in this population depending on the virus. The very young, elderly, pregnant women, and people with immune deficiencies are more likely to develop severe symptoms.

| Arbovirus | Disease(s) | Incubation period | Symptoms | Duration of symptoms | Complications | Case fatality rate | Vector(s) | Primary host(s) | Geographic distribution | Does infection provide lifelong immunity? |
|---|---|---|---|---|---|---|---|---|---|---|
| Dengue virus | Dengue fever | 3–14 days | Asymptomatic in most cases; fever, headache, rash, muscle, and joint pains | 7–10 days | Shock, internal bleeding, and organ damage | <1% with treatment, 1–5% without; about 25% in severe cases | Aedes mosquitoes, especially Aedes aegypti | Humans | Near the equator globally | Varies (Note: Infection provides lifelong immunity to the specific serotype causing illness, but temporary immunity to other serotypes.) |
| Japanese encephalitis virus | Japanese encephalitis | 5–15 days | Asymptomatic in most cases; fever, headache, fatigue, nausea, and vomiting | | Encephalitis, seizures, paralysis, coma, and long-term brain damage | 20–30% in encephalitis cases | Culex mosquitoes, especially Culex tritaeniorhynchus | Domestic pigs and wading birds | Southeast and East Asia | Yes |
| Rift Valley fever virus | Rift Valley fever | 2–6 days | Fever, headache, myalgia and liver abnormalities | 4–7 days | Hemorrhagic fever, meningoencephalitis | 1% in humans; in pregnant livestock, 100% fatality rate for fetuses | Culex tritaeniorhynchus and Aedes vexans | Micropteropus pusillus and Hipposideros abae | Eastern, Southern, and Western Africa | Yes |
| Tick-borne encephalitis virus | Tick-borne encephalitis | 7–14 days | Fever, headache, muscle pain, nausea, vomiting, meningitis, and encephalitis | | Paralysis and long-term brain damage | 1–2% | Ixodes scapularis, Ixodes ricinus, and Ixodes persulcatus | Small rodents | Eastern Europe and Southern Russia | Yes |
| West Nile virus | West Nile fever, encephalitis | 2–15 days | Asymptomatic in most cases; fever, headache, fatigue, nausea, vomiting, rash | 3–6 days | Swollen lymph nodes, meningitis, encephalitis, acute flaccid paralysis | 3–15% in severe cases | Culex mosquitoes | Passerine birds | North America, Europe, West and Central Asia, Oceania, and Africa | Yes |
| Yellow fever virus | Yellow fever | 3–6 days | Fever, headache, back pain, loss of appetite, nausea, and vomiting | 3–4 days | Jaundice, liver damage, gastrointestinal bleeding, recurring fever | 3% in general; 20% in cases with severe complications | Aedes mosquitoes, especially Aedes aegypti | Primates | Tropical and subtropical regions of South America and Africa | Yes |
| Zika virus | Zika fever | 3–14 days | Fever, rash, joint pain, nausea and vomiting | 2–7 days | Neurological complications (meningoencephalitis, microcephaly, Gullain-Barré Syndrome) | <1% | Aedes mosquitoes | Primates | Africa, the Americas, Asia and the Pacific | Yes |

== Cause ==
=== Transmission ===
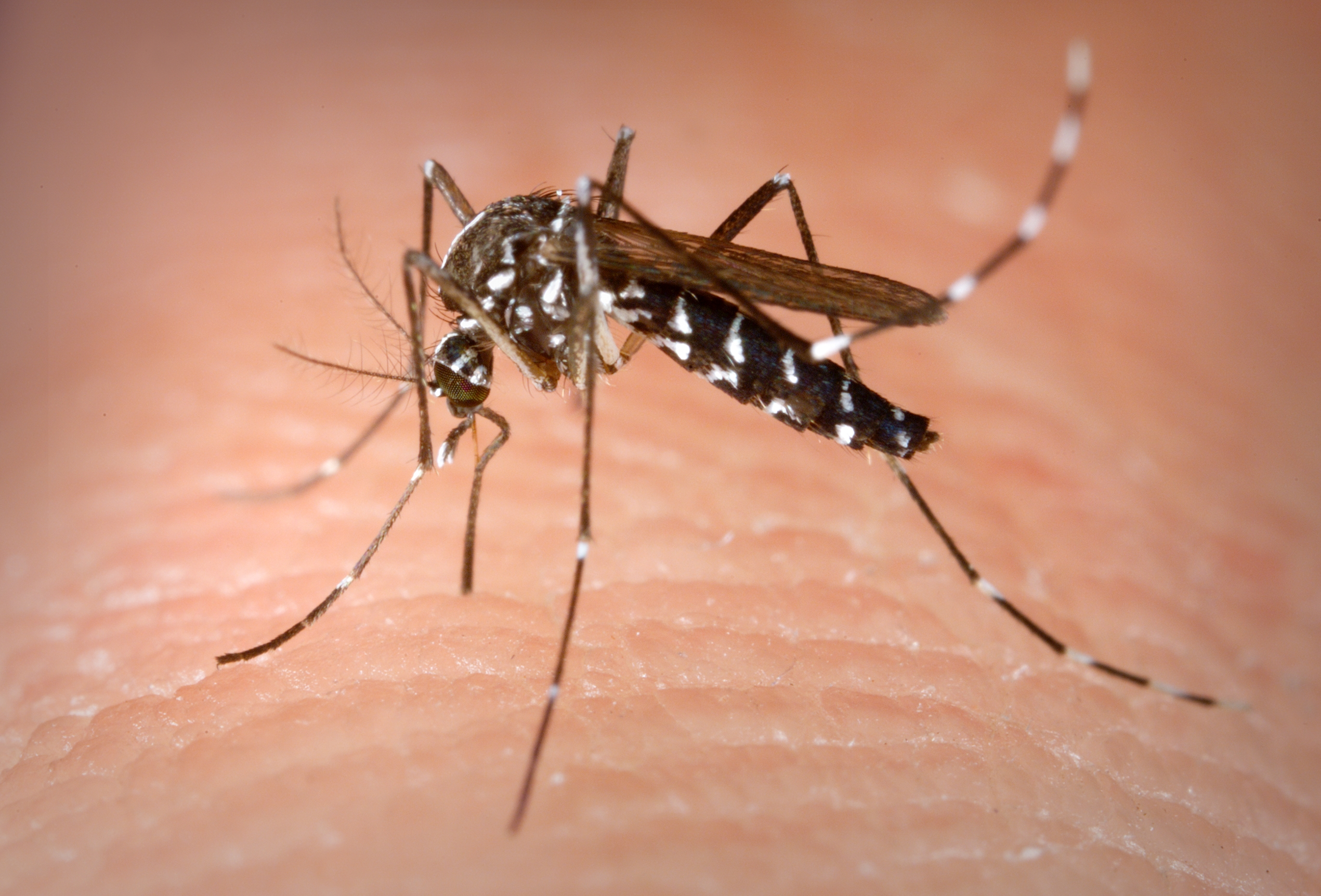
Many female mosquitoes, like those of Aedes albopictus, require a vertebrate blood meal in order for their eggs to develop.

Arboviruses maintain themselves in nature by going through a cycle between a host, an organism that carries the virus, and a vector, an organism that carries and transmits the virus to other organisms. For arboviruses, vectors are commonly mosquitoes, ticks, sandflies and other arthropods that consume the blood of vertebrates for nutritious or developmental purposes. Vertebrates which have their blood consumed act as the hosts, with each vector generally having an affinity for the blood of specific species, making those species the hosts.

Transmission between the vector and the host occurs when the vector feeds on the blood of the vertebrate, wherein the virus that has established an infection in the salivary glands of the vector comes into contact with the host's blood. While the virus is inside the host, it undergoes a process called amplification, where the virus replicates at sufficient levels to induce viremia, a condition in which there are large numbers of virions present in the blood. The abundance of virions in the host's blood allows the host to transmit the virus to other organisms if its blood is consumed by them. When uninfected vectors become infected from feeding, they are then capable of transmitting the virus to uninfected hosts, resuming amplification of virus populations. If viremia is not achieved in a vertebrate, the species can be called a "dead-end host", as the virus cannot be transmitted back to the vector.

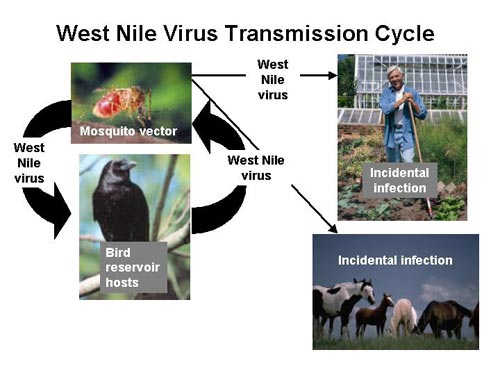
A flowchart showing the West Nile virus transmission cycle.

An example of this vector-host relationship can be observed in the transmission of the West Nile virus. Female mosquitoes of the genus Culex prefer to consume the blood of passerine birds, making them the hosts of the virus. When these birds are infected, the virus amplifies, potentially infecting multiple mosquitoes that feed on its blood. These infected mosquitoes may go on to further transmit the virus to more birds. If the mosquito is unable to find its preferred food source, it will choose another. Human blood is sometimes consumed, but since the West Nile virus does not replicate that well in mammals, humans are considered a dead-end host.

=== In humans ===
Person-to-person transmission of arboviruses is not common, but can occur. Blood transfusions, organ transplantation, and the use of blood products can transmit arboviruses if the virus is present in the donor's blood or organs. Because of this, blood and organs are often screened for viruses before being administered. Rarely, vertical transmission, or mother-to-child transmission, has been observed in infected pregnant and breastfeeding women. Exposure to used needles may also transmit arboviruses if they have been used by an infected person or animal. This puts intravenous drug users and healthcare workers at risk for infection in regions where the arbovirus may be spreading in human populations.

=== Virology ===
Arboviruses are a polyphyletic group, belonging to various viral genera and therefore exhibiting different virologic characteristics.

| Arbovirus | Genome type | Genome length | Diameter | Capsid shape | Enveloped? | Viral entry | Replication site | Viral shedding | Infected cell(s) | Genetic variability |
|---|---|---|---|---|---|---|---|---|---|---|
| African swine fever virus | dsDNA | 170-190 kilobases | ~200 nm | Icosahedral | Yes | Endocytosis | Nucleus | Budding | Endothelial cells and red and white blood cells | 22 genotypes |
| Chikungunya virus (CHIKV) | +ssRNA | 11.6 kilobases | 60 - 70 nm | Icosahedral | Yes | Membrane fusion | Cell cytoplasm | Budding | Epithelial cells, endothelial cells, primary fibroblasts and macrophages | Three genotypes |
| Dengue virus | +ssRNA | ~11,000 nucleobases | ~50 nm | Icosahedral | Yes | Membrane fusion | Cell cytoplasm | Budding | Langerhans and white blood cells | Four serotypes |
| Japanese encephalitis virus | +ssRNA | ~11,000 nucleobases | ~50 nm | Icosahedral | Yes | Membrane fusion | Cell cytoplasm | Budding | | Five genotypes |
| Rift Valley fever virus | -ssRNA | | | Spherical | Yes | | Cell cytoplasm | Budding | | None (Note: No significant distinct genetic populations exist due to the species having recent common ancestry.) |
| Tick-borne encephalitis virus | +ssRNA | ~11,000 nucleobases | 40-50 nm | Icosahedral | Yes | Membrane fusion | Cell cytoplasm | Budding | Neural cells | Five genotypes |
| West Nile virus | +ssRNA | ~11,000 nucleobases (11-12 kilo bases) | 45-50 nm | Icosahedral | Yes | Membrane fusion | Cell cytoplasm | Budding | | |
| Yellow fever virus | +ssRNA | ~11,000 nucleobases | 40-60 nm | Icosahedral | Yes | Membrane fusion | Cell cytoplasm | Budding | Hepatocytes and white blood cells | |
| Zika virus | +ssRNA | 10794 nucleobases | 40 nm | Icosahedral | Yes | Membrane fusion | Cell cytoplasm | Budding | | |

== Diagnosis ==
Preliminary diagnosis of arbovirus infection is usually based on clinical presentations of symptoms, places and dates of travel, activities, and epidemiological history of the location where infection occurred. Definitive diagnosis is typically made in a laboratory by employing some combination of blood tests, particularly immunologic, serologic and/or virologic techniques such as ELISA, complement fixation, polymerase chain reaction, neutralization test, and hemagglutination-inhibition test.

=== Classification ===
In the past, arboviruses were organized into one of four groups: A, B, C, and D. Group A denoted members of the genus Alphavirus, Group B were members of the genus Flavivirus, and Group C remains as the Group C serogroup of the genus Orthobunyavirus. Group D was renamed in the mid-1950s to the Guama group and is currently the Guama serogroup in the genus Orthobunyavirus. Currently, viruses are jointly classified according to Baltimore classification and a virus-specific system based on standard biological classification. With the exception of the African swine fever virus, which belongs to the Asfarviridae family of viruses, all major clinically important arboviruses belong to one of the following four groups:

- Order Bunyavirales (Baltimore class V)
  - Genus Orthobunyavirus
    - Bunyamwera virus
    - California encephalitis virus
    - Jamestown Canyon virus
    - La Crosse encephalitis virus
  - Genus Orthonairovirus
    - Crimean–Congo hemorrhagic fever virus
  - Genus Bandavirus
    - Dabie bandavirus
    - Heartland virus
  - Genus Phlebovirus
    - Rift Valley fever virus
    - Toscana virus
- Family Flaviviridae (Baltimore class IV)
  - Genus Flavivirus
    - Mosquito-borne viruses
      - Dengue virus group
        - Dengue virus
      - Japanese encephalitis virus group
        - Japanese encephalitis virus
        - Murray Valley encephalitis virus
        - St. Louis encephalitis virus
        - West Nile virus
      - Spondweni virus group
        - Spondweni virus
        - Zika virus
      - Yellow fever virus group
        - Yellow fever virus
    - Tick-borne viruses
      - Mammalian tick-borne virus group
        - Kyasanur forest disease virus
        - Tick-borne encephalitis virus
- Family Reoviridae (Baltimore class III)
  - Subfamily Sedoreovirinae
    - Genus Orbivirus
      - African horse sickness virus
      - Bluetongue disease virus
      - Epizootic hemorrhagic disease virus
      - Equine encephalosis virus
    - Genus Seadornavirus
      - Banna virus
  - Subfamily Spinareovirinae
    - Genus Coltivirus
      - Colorado tick fever virus
- Family Togaviridae (Baltimore class IV)
  - Genus Alphavirus
    - Chikungunya virus
    - Eastern equine encephalitis virus
    - Ross River virus
    - Venezuelan equine encephalitis virus
    - Western equine encephalitis virus'

== Prevention ==
Vector control measures, especially mosquito control, are essential to reducing the transmission of disease by arboviruses. Habitat control involves draining swamps and removal of other pools of stagnant water (such as old tires, large outdoor potted plants, empty cans, etc.) that often serve as breeding grounds for mosquitoes. Insecticides can be applied in rural and urban areas, inside houses and other buildings, or in outdoor environments. They are often quite effective for controlling arthropod populations, though use of some of these chemicals is controversial, and some organophosphates and organochlorides (such as DDT) have been banned in many countries. Infertile male mosquitoes have been introduced in some areas in order to reduce the breeding rate of relevant mosquito species. Larvicides are also used worldwide in mosquito abatement programs. Temefos is a common mosquito larvicide.

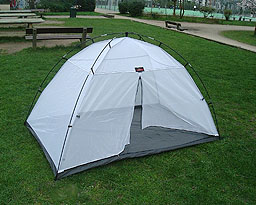
Tent made of mosquito netting

People can also reduce the risk of getting bitten by arthropods by employing personal protective measures such as sleeping under mosquito nets, wearing protective clothing, applying insect repellents such as permethrin and DEET to clothing and exposed skin, and (where possible) avoiding areas known to harbor high arthropod populations. Arboviral encephalitis can be prevented in two major ways: personal protective measures and public health measures to reduce the population of infected mosquitoes. Personal measures include reducing time outdoors particularly in early evening hours, wearing long pants and long sleeved shirts and applying mosquito repellent to exposed skin areas. Public health measures often require spraying of insecticides to kill juvenile (larvae) and adult mosquitoes.

=== Vaccination ===
Vaccines are available for the following arboviral diseases:

- Japanese encephalitis
- Yellow fever
- Tick-borne encephalitis
- Rift Valley Fever (only veterinary use)

Vaccines are in development for the following arboviral diseases:

- Zika Virus
- Dengue fever
- Eastern Equine encephalitis
- West Nile
- Chikungunya
- Rift Valley Fever

== Treatment ==
Because the arboviral encephalitides are viral diseases, antibiotics are not an effective form of treatment and no effective antiviral drugs have yet been discovered. Treatment is supportive, attempting to deal with problems such as swelling of the brain, loss of the automatic breathing activity of the brain and other treatable complications like bacterial pneumonia.

The WHO caution against the use of aspirin and ibuprofen as they can increase the risk of bleeding.

== Epidemiology ==
Most arboviruses are located in tropical areas, however as a group they have a global distribution. The warm climate conditions found in tropical areas allows for year-round transmission by the arthropod vectors. Other important factors determining geographic distribution of arthropod vectors include rainfall, humidity, and vegetation.

Mapping methods such as GIS and GPS have allowed for spatial and temporal analyses of arboviruses. Tagging cases or breeding sites geographically has allowed for deeper examination of vector transmission.

To see the epidemiology of specific arboviruses, the following resources hold maps, fact sheets, and reports on arboviruses and arboviral epidemics.

| Resource | Description | Link |
|---|---|---|
| World Health Organization | The WHO compiles studies and maps of the distribution, risk factors, and prevention of specific viruses. The WHO also hosts DengueNet, a database which can be queried about Dengue cases. | http://www.who.int/en/ |
| CDC ArboNet Dynamic Map | This interactive map is created by USGS using data from the CDC ArboNET. It provides distribution maps of cases in humans and vectors in the United States. | https://web.archive.org/web/20161215234534/http://diseasemaps.usgs.gov/mapviewer/ |
| Center for Disease Control ArboCatalog | The ArboCatalog documents probable arboviruses recorded by the Center for Disease Control, and provides detailed information about the viruses. | https://wwwn.cdc.gov/Arbocat/Default.aspx |

== History ==
| Year | Event |
|---|---|
| 1800s | Dengue fever epidemics occur globally |
| 1898–1914 | First large scale effort to prevent arbovirus infection takes place in Florida, Havana, and the Panama Canal Zone |
| 1901 | First arbovirus, the yellow fever virus, is discovered |
| 1906 | Dengue fever transmission is discovered |
| 1936 | Tick-borne encephalitis virus is discovered |
| 1937 | Yellow fever vaccine is invented |
| 1937 | West Nile virus is discovered |
| 1950s | Japanese encephalitis vaccines are invented |
| 1980s | Insecticide treated mosquito nets are developed |
| 1999 | West Nile virus reaches the Western Hemisphere |
| Late 1900s | Dengue fever spreads globally |

Arboviruses were not known to exist until the rise of modern medicine, with the germ theory and an understanding that viruses were distinct from other microorganisms. The connection between arthropods and disease was not postulated until 1881 when Cuban doctor and scientist Carlos Finlay proposed that yellow fever may be transmitted by mosquitoes instead of human contact, a reality that was verified by Major Walter Reed in 1901. The primary vector, Aedes aegypti, had spread globally from the 15th to the 19th centuries as a result of globalization and the slave trade. This geographic spreading caused dengue fever epidemics throughout the 18th and 19th centuries, and later, in 1906, transmission by the Aedes mosquitoes was confirmed, making yellow fever and dengue fever the first two diseases known to be caused by viruses.

Thomas Milton Rivers published the first clear description of a virus as distinct from a bacterium in 1927. The discovery of the West Nile virus came in 1937, and has since been found in Culex populations causing epidemics throughout Africa, the Middle East, and Europe. The virus was introduced into the Western Hemisphere in 1999, sparking a series of epidemics. During the latter half of the 20th century, Dengue fever reemerged as a global disease, with the virus spreading geographically due to urbanization, population growth, increased international travel, and global warming, and continues to cause at least 50 million infections per year, making Dengue fever the most common and clinically important arboviral disease.

Yellow fever, alongside malaria, was a major obstacle in the construction of the Panama Canal. French supervision of the project in the 1880s was unsuccessful because of these diseases, forcing the abandonment of the project in 1889. During the American effort to construct the canal in the early 1900s, William C. Gorgas, the Chief Sanitary Officer of Havana, was tasked with overseeing the health of the workers. He had past success in eradicating the disease in Florida and Havana by reducing mosquito populations through draining nearby pools of water, cutting grass, applying oil to the edges of ponds and swamps to kill larvae, and capturing adult mosquitoes that remained indoors during the daytime. Joseph Augustin LePrince, the Chief Sanitary Inspector of the Canal Zone, invented the first commercial larvicide, a mixture of carbolic acid, resin, and caustic soda, to be used throughout the Canal Zone. The combined implementation of these sanitation measures led to a dramatic decline in the number of workers dying and the eventual eradication of yellow fever in the Canal Zone as well as the containment of malaria during the 10-year construction period. Because of the success of these methods at preventing disease, they were adopted and improved upon in other regions of the world.

== See also ==
- List of diseases spread by invertebrates
- List of insect-borne diseases
- Mosquito-borne disease
- Robovirus
- Tibovirus
- Tick-borne disease
