= List of insect-borne diseases =

This article contains a list of insect-borne diseases. They can take the form of parasitic worms, bacteria, protozoa, viruses, or the insects directly acting as a parasite.

== Insect-borne diseases ==
=== Mosquitoes ===
Mosquitoes are vectors for a large number of diseases, the large majority being viral in nature. Mosquito-borne viruses fall into four major groups: Bunyavirales, Flaviviridae, Reoviridae, and Togaviridae. They can present as either arbovirus encephalitis or viral hemorrhagic fevers.

Viral diseases
Group	Presentation	Disease	Primary vector
Bunyavirales	Arbovirus encephalitis	Batai virus	
Bunyavirales	Arbovirus encephalitis	Bwamba Fever	
Bunyavirales	Arbovirus encephalitis	California encephalitis	
Bunyavirales	Arbovirus encephalitis	Jamestown Canyon encephalitis	
Bunyavirales	Arbovirus encephalitis	La Crosse encephalitis	Aedes triseriatus (eastern tree hole mosquito)
Bunyavirales	Arbovirus encephalitis	Oropouche fever	
Bunyavirales	Arbovirus encephalitis	Tahyna virus	
Bunyavirales	Arbovirus encephalitis	Tete virus	
Bunyavirales	Viral hemorrhagic fever	Bunyamwera fever	
Bunyavirales	Viral hemorrhagic fever	Rift Valley fever	Culex spp
Flaviviridae	Arbovirus encephalitis	Japanese encephalitis	Culex spp
Flaviviridae	Arbovirus encephalitis	Murray Valley encephalitis virus	Culex spp esp. Culex annulirostris
Flaviviridae	Arbovirus encephalitis	Rocio viral encephalitis	Psorophora ferox and possibly other Culex spp
Flaviviridae	Arbovirus encephalitis	Saint Louis encephalitis	Culex pipiens (northern house mosquito), C. quinquefasciatus (southern house mosquito)
Flaviviridae	Arbovirus encephalitis	Spondweni fever	
Flaviviridae	Arbovirus encephalitis	Usutu virus	Culex spp
Flaviviridae	Arbovirus encephalitis	West Nile fever	Culex tarsalis, Culex quinquefasciatus, Culex pipiens
Flaviviridae	Viral hemorrhagic fever	Dengue fever	Aedes spp.
Flaviviridae	Viral hemorrhagic fever	Yellow fever	Aedes spp.
Flaviviridae	Viral hemorrhagic fever	Zika fever	Aedes spp.
Reoviridae	Arbovirus encephalitis	Banna virus	Culex spp
Togaviridae	Arbovirus encephalitis	Barmah Forest virus	Vectors include Aedes vigilax and Culex annulirostris
Togaviridae	Arbovirus encephalitis	Chikungunya	Aedes albopictus and Aedes aegypti
Togaviridae	Arbovirus encephalitis	Eastern equine encephalitis	Culiseta melanura (black-tailed mosquito)
Togaviridae	Arbovirus encephalitis	Mayaro virus disease	Haemagogus spp
Togaviridae	Arbovirus encephalitis	O'nyong'nyong fever	anopheline mosquitoes
Togaviridae	Arbovirus encephalitis	Pogosta disease	
Togaviridae	Arbovirus encephalitis	Ross River fever	Vectors in different areas include: Culex annulirostris (inland), Aedes vigilax (northern coastal regions) and Aedes camptorhynchus (southern coastal regions)
Togaviridae	Arbovirus encephalitis	Semliki Forest virus	
Togaviridae	Arbovirus encephalitis	Venezuelan equine encephalitis virus	Culex spp esp Aedes albopictus
Togaviridae	Arbovirus encephalitis	Western equine encephalitis virus	Culex tarsalis

Non-viral diseases
Disease type	Disease name	Infects
Parasitic fly Dermatobia hominis	Myiasis	humans and other animals, including other primates
Parasitic worm	Dirofilariasis	humans; hosts include canids
Parasitic worm	Lymphatic filariasis (sometimes resulting in elephantiasis)	humans
Protozoa	Malaria	vertebrates

=== Other insects ===
Insect	Disease type	Disease name
Black fly (Simulium)	Parasitic worm	Mansonelliasis
Black fly (Simulium)	Parasitic worm	Onchocerciasis (river blindness)
Deer fly (Chrysopsinae)	Bacteria	Tularemia
Deer fly (Chrysopsinae)	Parasitic worm	Loa loa filariasis
Flea	Bacteria	Murine typhus
Flea	Bacteria	Plague
Flour beetle	Parasitic worm	Hymenolepis nana (tapeworm)
Kissing bug	Protozoa	Chagas disease
Louse	Bacteria	Bacillary angiomatosis
Louse	Bacteria	Epidemic typhus
Louse	Bacteria	Relapsing fever
Louse	Bacteria	Trench fever
Midge (Culicoides)	Parasitic worm	Mansonelliasis
Midge (Culicoides)	Virus	Oropouche fever
Sandfly (Phlebotominae)	Bacteria	Carrion's disease
Sandfly (Phlebotominae)	Protozoa	Leishmaniasis
Sandfly (Phlebotominae)	Virus	Adria virus (ADRV)
Sandfly (Phlebotominae)	Virus	Chandipura vesiculovirus
Sandfly (Phlebotominae)	Virus	Pappataci fever
Tsetse fly	Protozoa	African trypanosomiasis (sleeping sickness)

== Direct parasites ==
Type	Name
Flea	Human flea
Flea	Tunga penetrans (Tungiasis)
Fly (myiasis)	Cochliomyia hominivorax (screw-worm)
Fly (myiasis)	Cordylobia anthropophaga (blow-fly)
Fly (myiasis)	Dermatobia hominis (botfly)
Hemiptera	Bed bug
Louse	Pediculosis capitis (Head louse)
Louse	Pediculosis corporis (Body louse)
Louse	Pediculosis pubis (Crab louse)

== See also ==
- Arbovirus
- Climate change and infectious diseases
- List of diseases spread by invertebrates
- Mosquito-borne disease
- Robovirus
- Tibovirus
- Tick-borne disease
