= Woodtick =

Woodtick or wood tick is the common name for several ticks, including:

- Dermacentor variabilis, also known as the American dog tick
- Dermacentor andersoni, also known as the Rocky Mountain wood tick
