= William S. Romoser =

American entomologist

William Sherburne Romoser (October 18, 1940 — May 5, 2021) was an American entomologist. He was a professor of Arbovirology and Medical Entomology at the Ohio University.

== Education and career ==
Romoser was born in October 18, 1940 in Columbus, Ohio. He completed his BSc at Ohio State University in 1962. He stayed to complete his PhD in Zoology under the supervision of Carl Venard at the same institution in 1964. His thesis title was The Development Of The Oesophageal Diverticula In Aedes Triseriatus (Say).

Romoser was an emeritus professor of Arbovirology and Medical Entomology at the Ohio University. Previously, he was the Director of the International Development Studies Program, Ohio University Center for International Studies and the Director and co-founder of the Ohio University Tropical Disease Institute. He was 1992 chair of the American Committee of Medical Entomology, American Society of Tropical Medicine & Hygiene and president of the Ohio Mosquito and Vector Association in 1995 & 1996. Romoser was a research entomologist with the Florida Medical Entomology Laboratory (1971-1974) and with the USAMRIID (1983-2003). He was a senior National Research Council Senior Postdoctoral Research Associate at USAMRIID (1984-1985).

He was the sole author of the original edition of The Science of Entomology (1973 & 1981) and co-author for the 3rd and 4th editions (1994 & 1998) and has been a contributing author to Biology of Disease Vectors (1996) and Medical Entomology: A Textbook on Public Health and Veterinary Problems Caused by Arthropods (2000).

He was invited to present a lecture on "Overview of Arthropods & Their Impact on the Health of Humans & Other Vertebrates" as part of the "Vector-borne Disease" series in The Biomedical & Life Sciences collection, Henry Stewart Talks Ltd., London.

In late 2019, having spent years analyzing NASA images of Mars, Romoser presented a poster on evidence of insect-like forms on the red planet at a national meeting of the Entomological Society of America.

Romoser died suddenly on May 5, 2021.

== Books ==
- The Science of Entomology. 1st ed. Macmillan (1973), ISBN 0-02-403420-7. 2nd ed. Macmillan (1981) ISBN 978-0024034106.
