= Calisher =

Calisher is a surname. Notable people with the surname include:

- Charles Calisher, American virologist
- Hortense Calisher (1911–2009), American writer
