= Tick paralysis =

- Specialty: Emergency medicine, neurology

Tick paralysis is a type of paralysis caused by specific types of ticks reported mostly from the Americas, Asia, and Australia. Unlike other tick-borne diseases, the illness is caused by a neurotoxin produced in the tick's salivary gland. After prolonged attachment, the engorged tick transmits the toxin to its host, causing an ascending paralysis resembling Guillain-Barre syndrome. People can experience severe respiratory distress (similar to anaphylaxis). The incidence of tick paralysis is unknown. The diagnosis is entirely clinical, and treatment after tick removal is supportive.

== Signs and symptoms ==
Tick paralysis results from injection of a toxin from tick salivary glands during a blood meal after being attached for 3 to 7 days, causing fatigue within and weakness in both legs that progresses to paralysis. Deep tendon reflexes are usually decreased or absent. The paralysis ascends to the trunk, arms, and head, and may lead to respiratory failure and death. The disease can present as acute ataxia without muscle weakness. People may have minor sensory symptoms, such as local numbness, but no fever or headache or change in mental status. In a meta-analysis of global cases, facial nerve palsy was more commonly reported (35 cases) than gait ataxia. Ophthalmoplegia and bulbar palsy can occur.

== Pathogenesis ==
Tick paralysis is due to a neurotoxin found in the engorged female tick's salivary gland that enters the bloodstream of the host while the tick is feeding.

In North America, the two ticks most commonly associated with tick paralysis are the Rocky Mountain wood tick (Dermacentor andersoni) and the American dog tick (Dermacentor variabilis). Most North American cases of tick paralysis occur from April to June, when adult Dermacentor ticks emerge from hibernation and actively seek hosts.

In Asia, Dermacentor, Amblyomma, Rhipicephalus, and Hyalomma tick species have been most commonly reported as the cause of tick paralysis, while in Australia, it is the tick Ixodes holocyclus.

Experiments have indicated that the greatest amount of toxin is produced between the fifth and seventh day of attachment (often initiating or increasing the severity of symptoms). However, the timing may vary depending on the species of tick.

Unlike Lyme disease, ehrlichiosis, and babesiosis, which are caused by the systemic proliferation and expansion of microbes after the offending tick is gone, tick paralysis is chemically induced by the tick and therefore usually only continues in its presence. Once the tick is removed, symptoms usually diminish rapidly. However, in some cases, profound paralysis can develop and even become fatal before anyone becomes aware of a tick's presence.

== Diagnosis ==
Diagnosis is entirely based on symptoms and upon finding an embedded tick, usually on the scalp.

In the absence of a tick, the differential diagnosis includes poliomyelitis, myasthenia gravis, spinal cord lesions, and Guillain–Barré syndrome. The latter progresses more slowly than tick paralysis, is treated with expensive therapies such as plasmapheresis or immune globulin, but this treatment is not effective in tick paralysis. Botulism may be in the differential, but presents with a descending paralysis. Other differential diagnoses include organophosphate poisoning, shellfish poisoning, pufferfish tetrodotoxin, or buckthorn poisoning from eating the fruits of Karwinskia humboldtiana.

Laboratory studies are normal. Electromyographic (EMG) studies usually show a variable reduction in the amplitude of compound muscle action potentials, but no abnormalities of repetitive nerve stimulations.

In animals, early signs of tick paralysis could be a change in an animal's voice and weakness in the back legs.

== Epidemiology ==
Tick paralysis was first described in Australia in the 19th century and has been reported mostly from the Americas, in the US from the Pacific Northwest, but also from the Southern US.

A 2023 metaanalysis of 121 cases published until then found 71 cases from North America, 33 cases from Asia (including India and Sri Lanka.), 14 cases in Australia, two cases in South America, and one case in Africa. The peak incidence of tick paralysis in North America occurs in the spring and early summer. It is reported more commonly in females and children.

Before 1989, 20 fatal cases were reported in Australia. Tick paralysis is of concern in domestic animals and livestock in the United States as well.

== Prevention ==
No human vaccine is currently available for any tick-borne disease, except for tick-borne encephalitis. Individuals should therefore take precautions when entering tick-infested areas, particularly in the spring and summer months. Preventive measures include avoiding trails that are overgrown with bushy vegetation, wearing light-coloured clothes that allow one to see the ticks more easily, and wearing long pants and closed-toe shoes. Tick repellents containing DEET (N,N, diethyl-m-toluamide) are only marginally effective and can be applied to skin or clothing. Rarely, severe reactions can occur in some people who use DEET-containing products. Young children may be especially vulnerable to these adverse effects. Permethrin, which can only be applied to clothing, is much more effective in preventing tick bites. Permethrin is not a repellent but rather an insecticide; it causes ticks to curl up and fall off the protected clothing, usually dying in the process.

== Treatment ==
Typically, removal of the entire tick results in rapid resolution of symptoms within minutes or hours, and treatment is supportive. If the tick is not removed, the toxin can be fatal. A 1969 study of children reported mortality rates of 10 – 12 percent, mostly due to respiratory paralysis. The tick is best removed by grasping it as close to the skin as possible and pulling in a firm, steady manner. Because the toxin lies in the tick's salivary glands, care must be taken to remove the entire tick (including the head).

Unlike the toxin of other tick species, the toxin of Ixodes holocyclus (Australian paralysis tick) may still be fatal even if the tick is removed.

For affected animals, food and water intake can worsen the outcome, as the toxin can prevent the animal from swallowing properly. People who find a tick on their animal are advised to remove it immediately and seek veterinary assistance if the animal shows any signs of illness. The tick can be placed in a tightly sealed plastic bag and taken to a veterinarian for identification.

== Neurotoxins ==
=== Dermacentor ===
The toxin of the Rocky Mountain wood tick (Dermacentor andersoni) is only produced by adult ticks and causes a mostly motor polyneuropathy, with less of a sensory component. Recovery is rapid within hours.

=== Ixodes holocyclus ===
Several attempts had been made to isolate and identify the neurotoxin for the tick species Ixodes holocyclus since the first isolation in 1966. In 1989 it was discovered that the 40-80 kDa protein fraction contained the toxin.

As of 2004, the neurotoxin structure and gene for Ixodes holocyclus have been identified; they are called holocyclotoxins (HT) after the species. At least three members (HT-1, HT-3, and HT-12) trigger paralysis by presynaptic inhibition of neurotransmitter release via a calcium dependent mechanism resulting in a reduction of quantal content, and loss of effective neuromuscular synaptic transmission.

Holocyclotoxins are produced by both nymphs and adults. It is the only known toxin where recovery is prolonged, between days and weeks.

=== Rhipicephalus ===
Rhipicephalus are hard ticks from tropical Africa. In the case of Rhipicephalus evertsi evertsi, only adult ticks cause the paralysis. The toxin inhibits nerve conduction in peripheral nerves, and recovery occurs within hours to two days.

=== Argasids ===
The neurotoxin of the South African tick Argas walkerae, in contrast to the other ticks, is produced by its larvae, and works by impairing acetylcholine release and desensitizing its receptor. Recovery is rapid, within hours.

== Culture ==
In the TV show, Hart of Dixie, Season 1, Episode 2, a patient is diagnosed with tick paralysis who has been deer hunting.

In the TV show, Emergency!, Season 5, Episode 4, "Equipment" (first aired Oct. 4, 1975), Dr. Joe Early diagnoses a young boy who has fallen from a tree with tick paralysis, after eliminating polio as a cause.

In the TV show, House, Season 2, Episode 16, "Safe", Dr House diagnoses a patient (played by Michelle Trachtenberg) with tick paralysis.

In the TV show, Remedy, Season 1 Episode 7, "Tomorrow, the Green Grass", Rebecca is diagnosed with tick paralysis.

In the TV show, Royal Pains, Season 1 Episode 3, "Strategic Planning", a US Senator's teenage son is diagnosed with and overcomes tick paralysis.

In the TV show, Chicago Med, Season 3, Episode 5, "Mountains and Molehills", a young girl returning from Australia with increasing paralysis is diagnosed with tick paralysis.

== See also ==
- Polyneuropathy in dogs and cats for tick paralysis in dogs
- Tick-borne disease
