= Bhanja virus =

Bhanja bandavirus

Virus classification
- (unranked): Virus
- Realm: Riboviria
- Kingdom: Orthornavirae
- Phylum: Negarnaviricota
- Class: Bunyaviricetes
- Order: Hareavirales
- Family: Phenuiviridae
- Genus: Bandavirus
- Species: Bhanja bandavirus

Species of virus

The Bhanja virus is a tick-borne virus first discovered in a tick (Haemaphysalis intermedia) taken from a paralyzed goat in Bhanjanagar, India in 1954. Bhanja virus in humans was first documented in 1974 when Charles Calisher was working with the virus in a lab and contracted it himself. His experience with the virus was mild and included symptoms of mild aching in muscles and joints, moderate headache, slight photophobia. The Bhanja virus is a member of the Bhanja virus serocomplex and is a member of the Bunyavirales order.

== Transmission ==
The Bhanja virus is transmitted from ticks and has furthermore mainly been isolated from the ticks of the genera Dermacentor and Haemaphysalis, although it can be transmitted by any Ixodidae ticks. Bhanja virus is not known to be transmitted between humans.

== Hosts ==
The Bhanja virus has been found in vertebrate animals, most commonly in sheep, goats, cattle, African hedgehogs (Atelerix albiventris), and African ground squirrels (Xerus erythropus). It has been known to be pathogenic in small animals and children and can also affect adult humans.

== Symptoms ==
The Bhanja virus produces febrile illness in humans with symptoms including photophobia, vomiting, meningoencephalitis, and slight or partial paralysis.

== Treatment ==
Treatment depends on the severity of the symptoms. Due to viral infections not responding to antibiotics, treatment is mainly to reduce the signs and symptoms, for which acetaminophen is suggested.

== Prevention ==
Prevention involves avoiding tick bites, excessive foliage, and bushy areas. If you do come in contact with these areas, wear long sleeves and pants to cover as much skin as possible. Be specifically careful in areas used to graze or feed goats or sheep.

== Location ==
The Bhanja virus has been isolated in Europe, including: Italy, Croatia, Bulgaria, Romania, Eastern Slovakia, in Asia, including: India, Kirghizia, Kazakhstan, Azerbaijan, Armenia and in Africa, including Senegal, Guinea, Nigeria, Cameroon, Central Africa, Kenya, Somali. There is a possibility that migratory birds play a role in spreading the virus by carrying infected ticks to new regions.
