= Charles Calisher =

Microbiologist

Charles Calisher is professor emeritus of microbiology at the College of Veterinary Medicine & Biomedical Sciences at Colorado State University.

== Education and career ==
Calisher received a bachelor's degree in bacteriology from the Philadelphia College of Pharmacy and Science, a master's degree in biology and gnotobiosis from the University of Notre Dame, and a Ph.D. in Microbiology from Georgetown University. His research interests include ecology and epidemiology, viral diagnostics, viral taxonomy, viral evolution of roboviruses, arboviruses, and hantaviruses.

== Writings ==
- Lifting the Impenetrable Veil: From Yellow fever to Ebola Hemorrhagic Fever and SARS. Rockpile Press. 2013.
- Calisher, C. H.; Childs, J. E.; Field, H. E.; Holmes, K. V.; Schountz, T. (2006). "Bats: important reservoir hosts of emerging viruses". Clinical Microbiology Reviews. 19 (3): 531–545. doi:10.1128/CMR.00017-06. PMC 1539106. PMID 16847084.
- Calisher, Charles H; Karabatsos, Nick; Dalrymple, Joel M; Shope, Robert E; Porterfield, James S; Westaway, Edwin G; Brandt, Walter E (1989). "Antigenic relationships between flaviviruses as determined by cross-neutralization tests with polyclonal antisera". Journal of General Virology. 70 (1). Microbiology Society: 37–43. doi:10.1099/0022-1317-70-1-37. PMID 2543738.
- Lanciotti, Robert S; Calisher, Charles H; Gubler, Duane J; Chang, Gwong-Jen; Vorndam, A. Vance (1992). "Rapid detection and typing of dengue viruses from clinical samples by using reverse transcriptase-polymerase chain reaction". Journal of Clinical Microbiology. 30 (3): 545–551. doi:10.1128/jcm.30.3.545-551.1992. PMC 265106. PMID 1372617.
