= Eyach virus =

Virus classification
- (unranked): Virus
- Realm: Riboviria
- Kingdom: Orthornavirae
- Phylum: Duplornaviricota
- Class: Resentoviricetes
- Order: Reovirales
- Family: Spinareoviridae
- Genus: Coltivirus
- Species: Coltivirus ixodis

Species of virus

Eyach virus (EYAV) is a viral infection in the Spinareoviridae family transmitted by a tick vector. It has been isolated from Ixodes ricinus and I. ventalloi ticks in Europe.

== Transmission and clinical syndromes ==
Eyach virus is acquired by tick bite. The tick gets infected after a blood meal from a vertebrate host, which is suspected to be the European rabbit O. cunniculus. Eyach virus has been linked to tick-borne encephalitis, as well as polyradiculoneuritis and meningopolyneuritis, based on serological samples of patients with these neurological disorders.
