= Blackfly =

Blackfly, black-fly, or black fly may refer to:

- Black fly, a fly of the family Simuliidae
- Blackfly (TV series), a 2001 Canadian comedy series
- Blackfly (film), a 1991 animated short based on the Wade Hemsworth song
- Black bean aphid (Aphis fabae)
- Double Dragon (hacking group), a Chinese hacking organisation sometimes known as Blackfly
- Opener BlackFly, an electric ultralight aircraft design
- Black Fly Beverage Company, a Canadian distillery of alcoholic beverages, founded in London, Ontario in 2005
- Pivotal BlackFly, American EVTOL plane

== See also ==
- Black Flies, original title of the film Asphalt City
- "The Black Fly Song", a song written by Wade Hemsworth
