= Tibovirus =

Term for a tick-borne virus

Tibovirus is a term often used to describe viruses that are transmitted by tick vectors. The word tibovirus is an acronym (TIck-BOrne virus). This falls within the superorder arthropod thus tibovirus is classified under Arthropod Borne virus (Arborvirus). For a person to acquire an infection, the tick must bite and feed for a sufficient period. The tiboviruses that affect humans are limited to within 3 families: Flaviviridae, Reoviridae, and Bunyaviridae.

== Taxonomy ==
=== Flaviviridae ===
==== Tick-borne meningoencephalitis virus ====
- Disease: Tick-borne meningoencephalitis
- Vector: deer tick (Ixodes scapularis), Ixodes ricinus (Europe), Ixodes persulcatus (Russia + Asia))
- Region: Europe and Northern Asia

=== Reoviridae ===
==== Colorado tick fever virus ====
- Disease: Colorado tick fever
- Vector: Dermacentor andersoni
- Region: US (West)

=== Bunyaviridae ===
==== Crimean-Congo hemorrhagic fever virus ====
- Disease: Crimean-Congo hemorrhagic fever
- Vector: Hyalomma marginatum, Rhipicephalus bursa
- Region: Southern part of Asia, Northern Africa, Southern Europe

==== Heartland virus ====
- Disease: Severe Febrile Illness
- Vector: Lone Star Tick (Amblyomma americanum)
- Region: Missouri and Tennessee, United States
