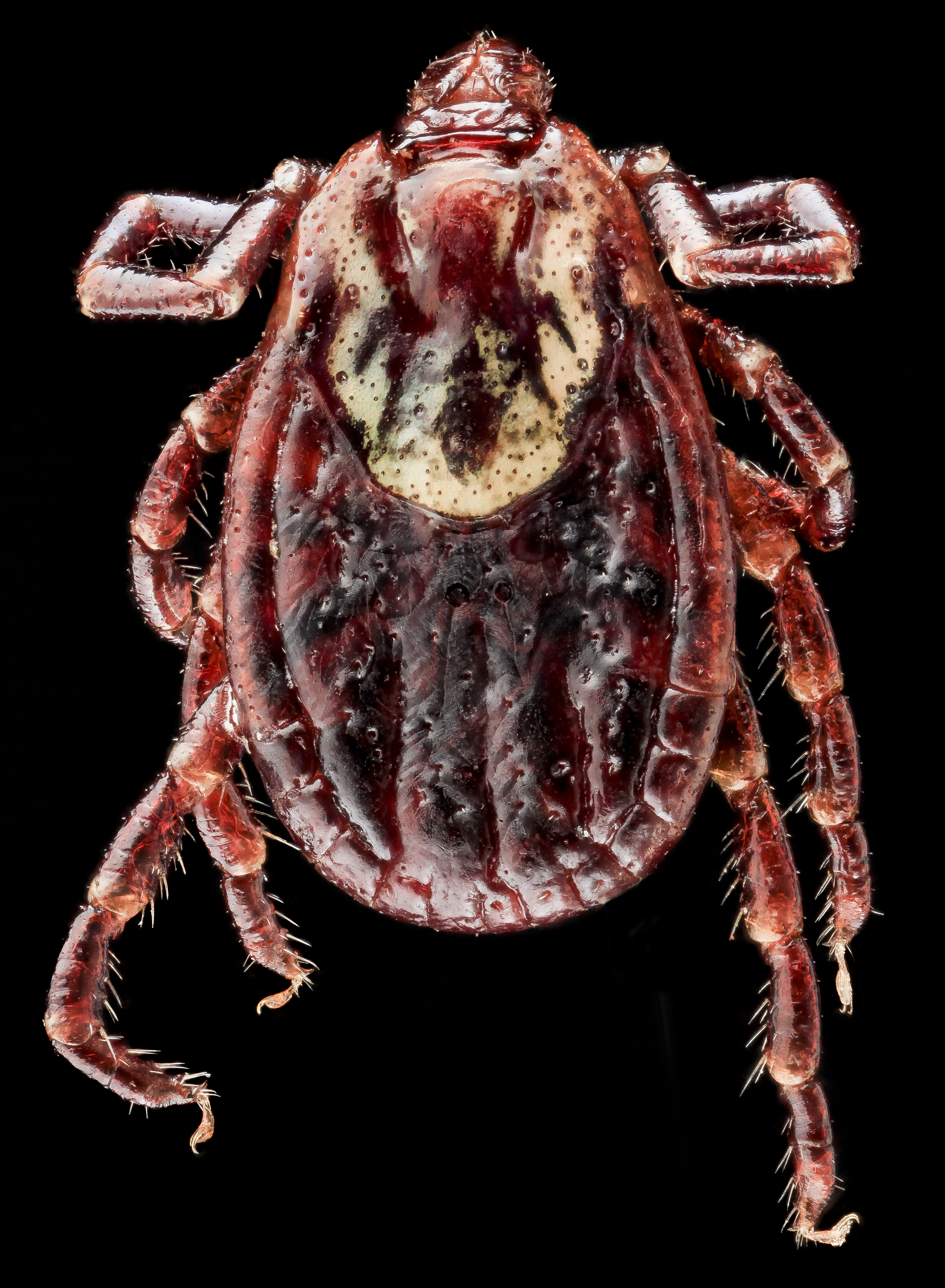
- Female
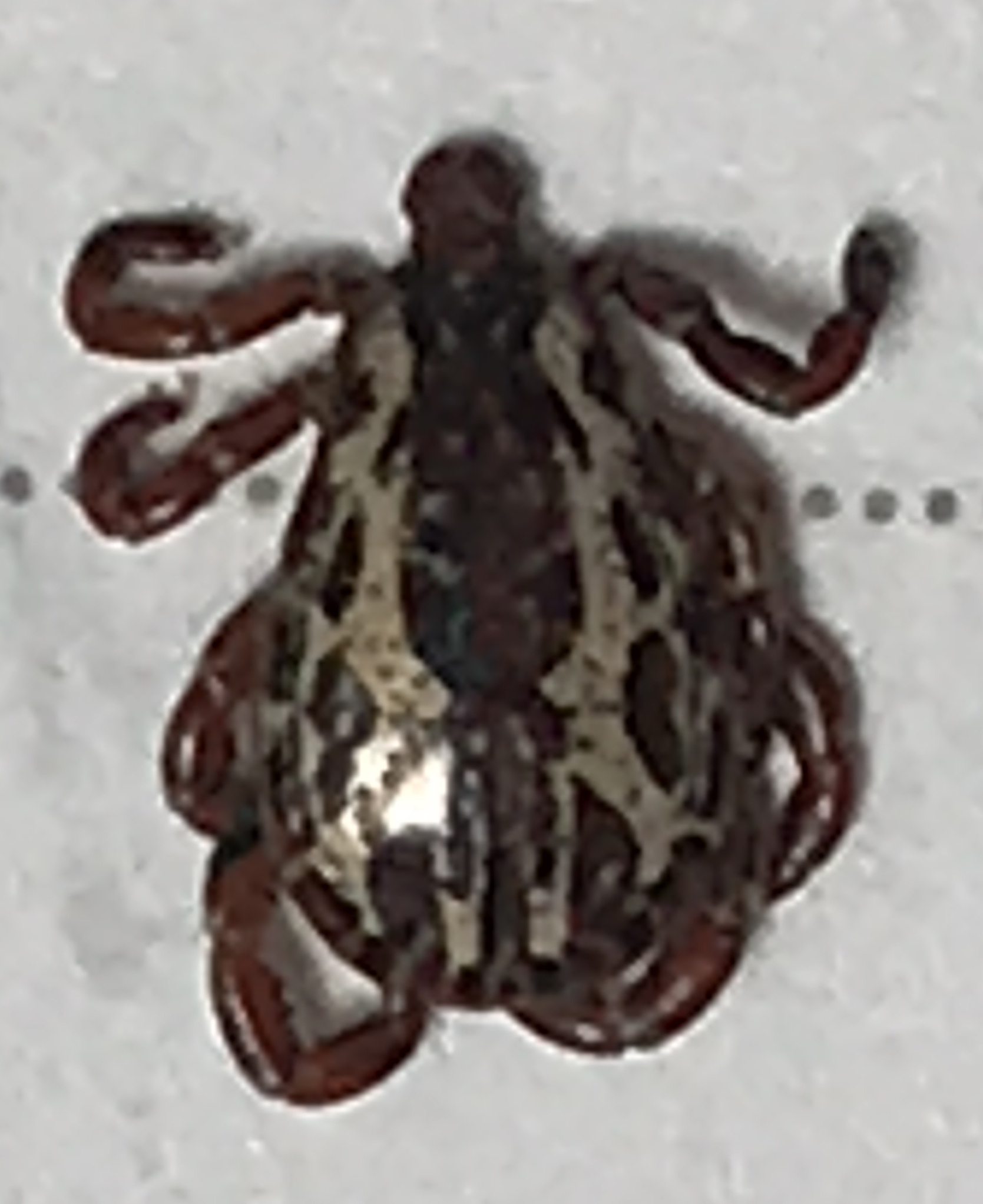
- Male

Scientific classification
- Kingdom: Animalia
- Phylum: Arthropoda
- Subphylum: Chelicerata
- Class: Arachnida
- Order: Ixodida
- Family: Ixodidae
- Genus: Dermacentor
- Species: D. variabilis

Binomial name
- Dermacentor variabilis (Say, 1821)
- Normal range in red; other reports in blue

= Dermacentor variabilis =

Species of tick

Dermacentor variabilis, also known as the American dog tick or wood tick, is a species of tick that is known to carry bacteria responsible for several diseases in humans, including Rocky Mountain spotted fever and tularemia (Francisella tularensis). It is one of the best-known hard ticks. Diseases are spread when it sucks blood from the host. It may take several days for the host to experience symptoms.

Though D. variabilis may be exposed to Borrelia burgdorferi, the causative agent of Lyme disease, these ticks are not competent vectors for the transmission of this disease. The primary vectors for B. burgdorferi are the deer ticks Ixodes scapularis in eastern parts of the United States, Ixodes pacificus in California and Oregon, and Ixodes ricinus in Europe. D. variabilis may also carry Anaplasma phagocytophilum, the causative agent of human granulocytic anaplasmosis, and Ehrlichia chaffeensis, the causative agent of human monocytic ehrlichiosis.

Dermacentor ticks may also induce tick paralysis by elaboration of a neurotoxin that induces rapidly progressive flaccid quadriparesis similar to Guillain–Barré syndrome. The neurotoxin prevents presynaptic release of acetylcholine from neuromuscular junctions.

== Life cycle ==
The life cycle of ticks can vary depending on the species. Most ticks go through four stages: egg, six-legged larva, eight-legged nymph, and adult. After hatching from the egg, a tick must obtain a blood meal at every stage to survive. Ticks can feed on mammals, birds, reptiles, and amphibians. Unlike most tick species, D. variabilis prefers the same host during all of its life stages.

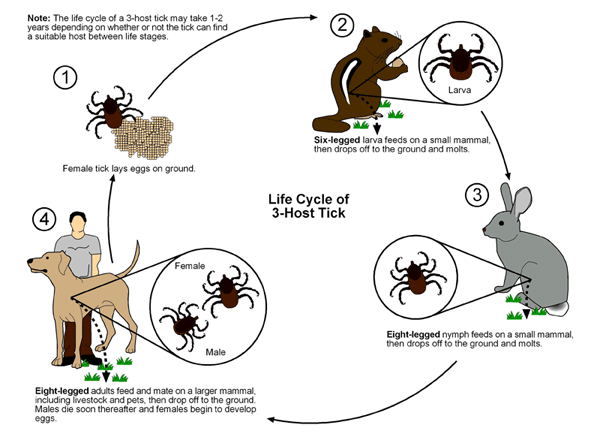
Dermacentor species life cycle

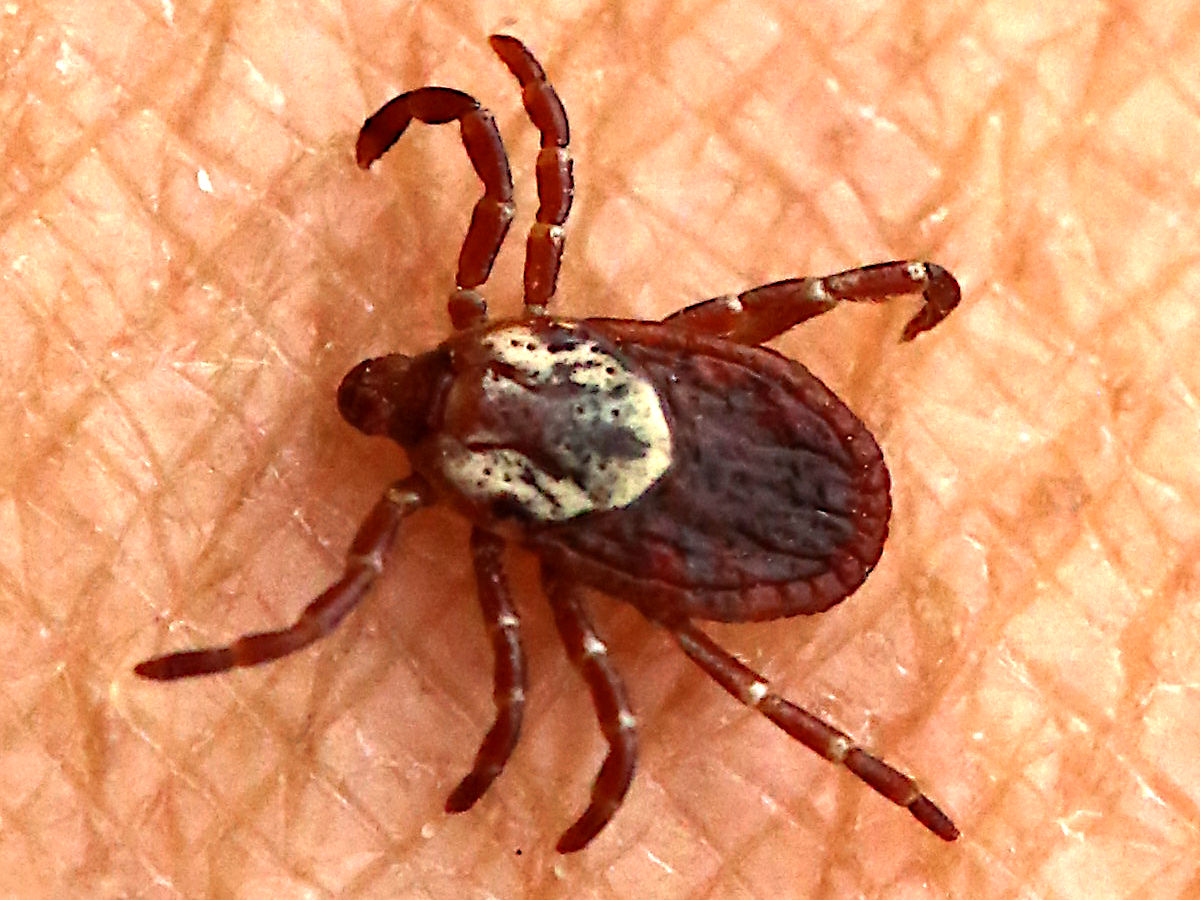
Female on human skin

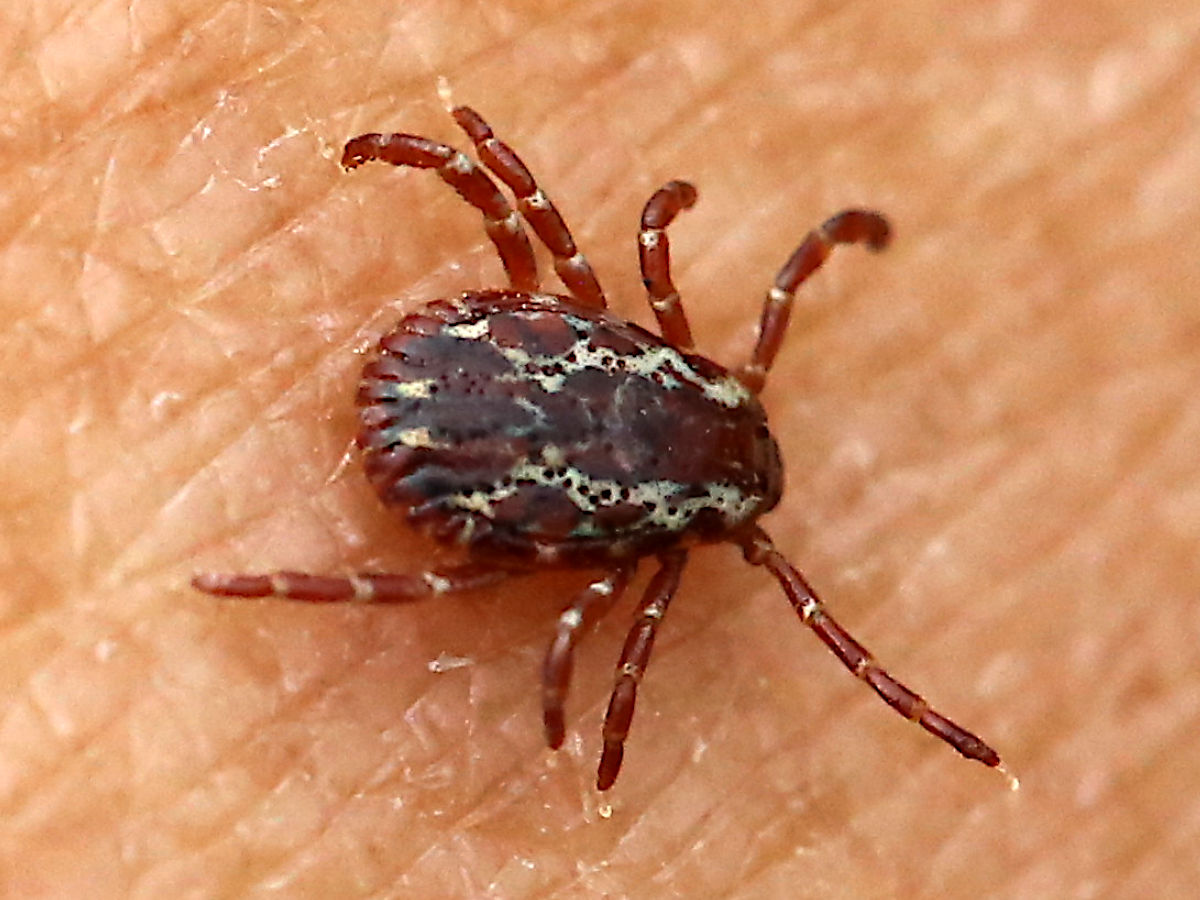
Male on human skin

== Distribution and seasonal activity ==
Within North America, the normal range is in the eastern part of the continent, with some reports in California. At the northernmost extent of its geographical range, in Nova Scotia and Massachusetts, ticks are active from April to August, with a peak in May to June. In coastal Virginia, the adults are active from April to September or October, with peaks in May and July. Seasonal activity in Ohio is from late April to September, with peaks in May to June and another smaller peak in August to September. In Georgia, adults are active from late March to August, with peaks in early May, late May, and late June. Florida adult activity is from April to July, with activity being restricted by high summer temperatures and low winter humidity.

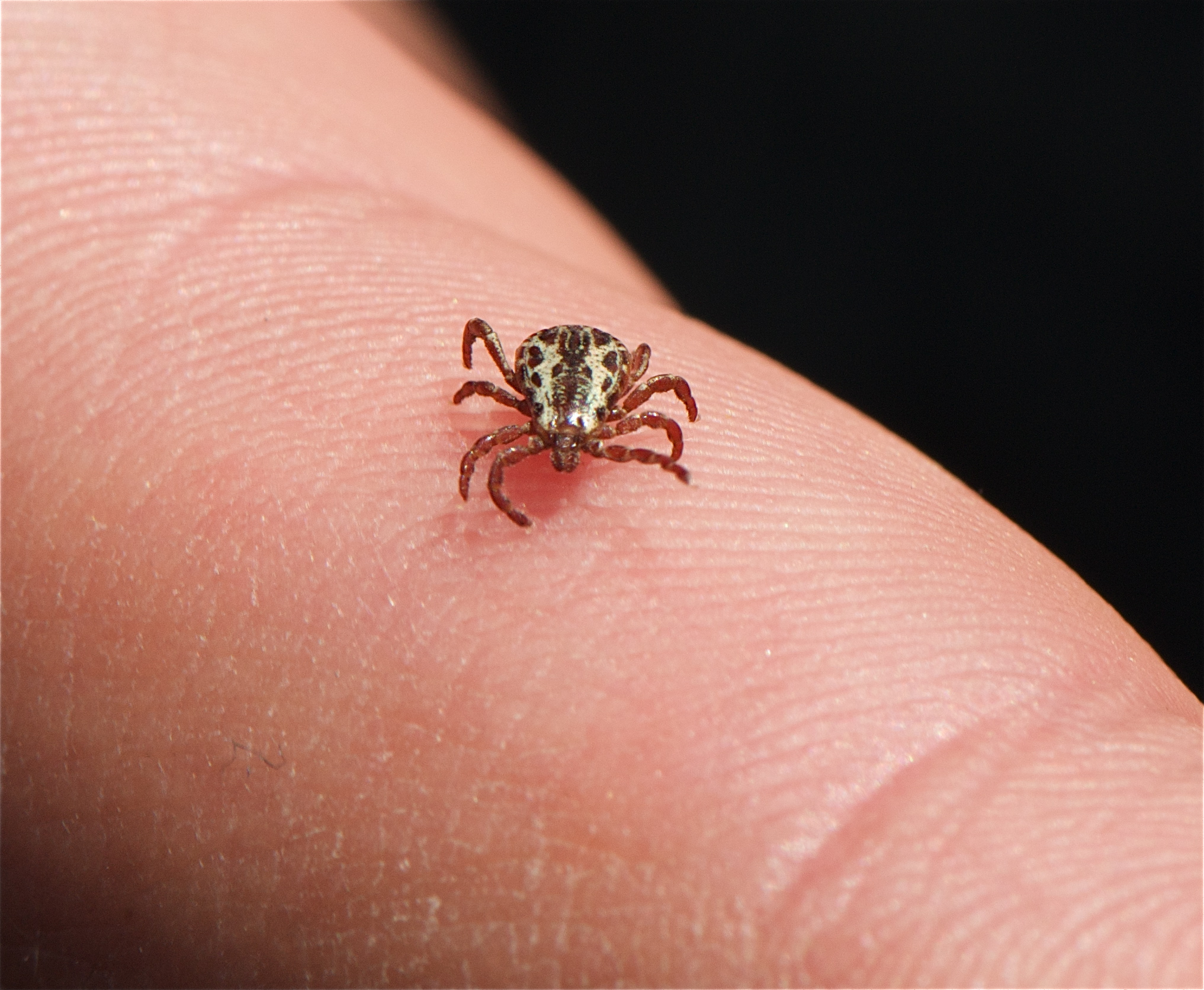
D. variabilis tick

== Disease transmission ==
Feeding ticks transmit pathogens to the host. Depending on the tick species and its stage of life, preparing to feed can take from 10 minutes to 2 hours. When the tick finds a feeding spot, it grasps the skin and cuts into the surface, where it then inserts its feeding tube. Many species also secrete a cement-like substance that keeps them firmly attached during the meal. The feeding tube can have barbs to help keep the tick in place. Ticks also can secrete small amounts of saliva with anesthetic properties so that the animal or person cannot feel that the tick has attached itself. Therefore, unless one feels the tick crawling, noticing the tick is difficult. If the tick is in a sheltered spot, it can go unnoticed and can slowly suck the blood for several days. If the host animal has a blood-borne infection, the tick will ingest the pathogens with the blood. Small amounts of saliva from the tick may also enter the skin of the host animal during the feeding process. If the tick contains a pathogen, the organism may be transmitted to the host animal in this way. After feeding, most ticks drop off and prepare for the next life stage. At its next feeding, it can then transmit an acquired disease to the new host.

Symptoms of Rocky Mountain spotted fever appear within 3-12 days, usually beginning with a sudden onset of fever and headache, and frequently followed 2-4 days later by a rash around the wrists and ankles that moves slowly up to the rest of the body. Other symptoms include nausea, loss of appetite, abdominal pain, or muscle aches. Rocky Mountain spotted fever can be fatal within days of symptoms beginning, if left untreated.

A tick bite does not automatically transfer diseases to the host. Instead, the tick must be attached to the host for a period of time, generally 6–8 hours but sometimes as little as 3–6 hours, before it is capable of transferring disease. The earlier the tick is removed from a host, the less likely it is to contract the illness.

== Treatments and prevention in dogs ==
The American dog tick is commonly found in highly wooded, shrubby, and long-grass areas. Tick numbers can be reduced by cutting the grass, which creates a low-humidity environment, which is undesirable to ticks. Pesticides can also be used and are most effective when applied to vegetation that has been cut to a short level. Doxycycline is the medication of choice to treat Rocky Mountain spotted fever in dogs. Doxycycline is given for 7–21 days dependent on the dosage. Tetracycline is effective and administered more frequently, being given for 14–21 days. Other antibiotic choices include enrofloxacin and chloramphenicol. Veterinary-approved flea and tick preparations are recommended, along with other topicals, collars, and shampoos. Regularly checking dogs and oneself for ticks after hiking or playing in grassy areas and removing ticks as soon as possible decrease the chances a dog will contract a secondary illness carried by the tick. Tweezers are the most common removal method, but fine-point tweezers are best to avoid tearing the tick and spreading possible infectious agents in the bite area. Spread the dog's fur, grasp the tick as close to the skin as possible, and very gently pull straight upward in a slow, steady motion. Another removal method is a tick removal hook: one places the prongs of the device on either side of the tick and twists upward. Tick removal hooks are recommended in areas where ticks are common. Removing the tick with fingers is never a good idea because squeezing to grasp the tick could potentially inject more infectious material. Apply rubbing alcohol to the bite area afterward to thoroughly clean the wound.

== See also ==
- Rhipicephalus sanguineus (Latreille, 1806) – brown dog tick
- Ticks of domestic animals
