= Colorado tick fever =

- Other names: Mountain tick fever, American tick fever, American mountain tick fever
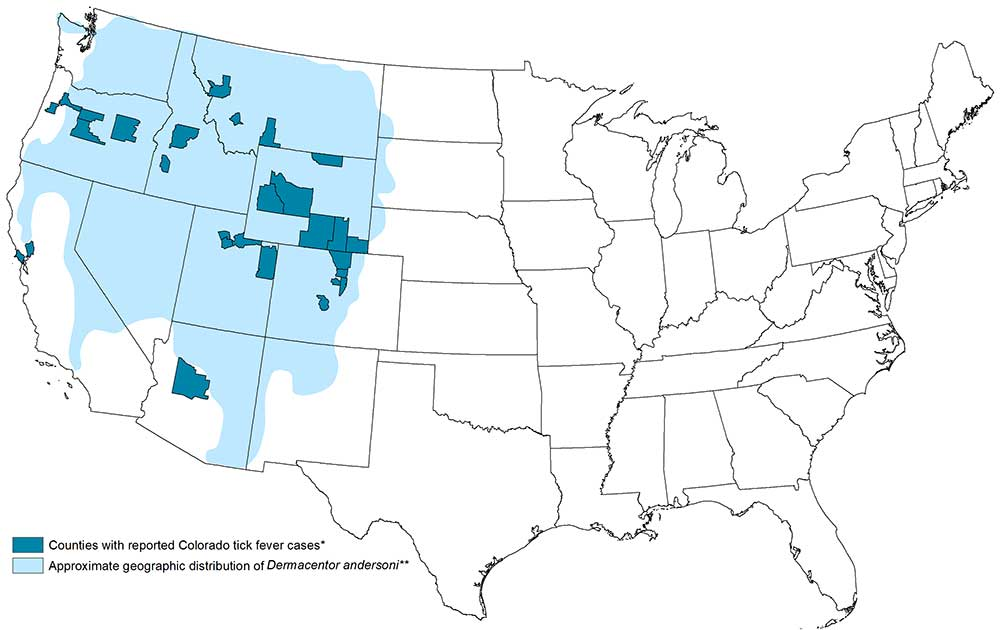
- Geographic distribution of Dermacentor andersoni ticks and Colorado tick fever virus disease cases, United States, 2010–2019.
- Specialty: Infectious disease

Colorado tick fever (CTF) is a viral infection transmitted from the bite of an infected Dermacentor andersoni (Rocky Mountain wood tick). It should not be confused with the bacterial tick-borne infection, Rocky Mountain spotted fever. Colorado tick fever is probably the same disease that American pioneers referred to as "mountain fever".

Colorado tick fever virus (CTFV) infects haemopoietic cells, particularly erythrocytes, which explains how the virus is transmitted by ticks and also accounts for the incidence of transmission by blood transfusion.

== Signs and symptoms ==
The first signs and symptoms of Colorado Tick Fever appear between the first and 14th day after the bite from the tick. Once bitten by the tick and the symptoms begin, one will more often than not experience a biphasic fever. A biphasic fever is a fever that attacks, only to let you feel better, just to infect you once again. Although the infection may only last a couple of weeks, the virus can be found in the red blood cells for up to six months after being cured.

Initial symptoms include fever, chills, headaches, pain behind the eyes, light sensitivity, muscle pain, generalized malaise, abdominal pain, enlargement of the liver and spleen, nausea and vomiting, and a flat or pimply rash. During the second phase of the virus, a high fever can return with an increase in symptoms. CTF can be very severe in cases involving children and can even require hospitalization. Complications with this disease have included aseptic meningitis, encephalitis, and hemorrhagic fever, but these are rare.

CTF is seasonal, mostly occurring in the Rocky Mountain region of the United States and usually in altitudes from 4,000 to 10,000 feet (1,600 to 3,000 meters). Patients with CTF are mostly campers and young males, who most likely have been bitten because of their occupational activities.

== Cause ==
=== Virology ===
Colorado tick fever virus

Virus classification
- (unranked): Virus
- Realm: Riboviria
- Kingdom: Orthornavirae
- Phylum: Duplornaviricota
- Class: Resentoviricetes
- Order: Reovirales
- Family: Spinareoviridae
- Genus: Coltivirus
- Species: Coltivirus dermacentoris

The virus particle, like other coltiviruses, is about 80 nm in diameter and is generally not enveloped. The double-stranded RNA viral genome is about 20,000 bp long and is divided into 12 segments, which are termed Seg-1 to Seg-12. Viral replication in infected cells is associated with characteristic cytoplasmic granular matrices. Evidence suggests the viral presence in mature erythrocytes is a result of replication of the virus in hematopoietic erythrocyte precursor cells and simultaneous maturation of the infected immature cells rather than of direct entry and replication of CTFV in mature erythrocytes.

=== Tick ===
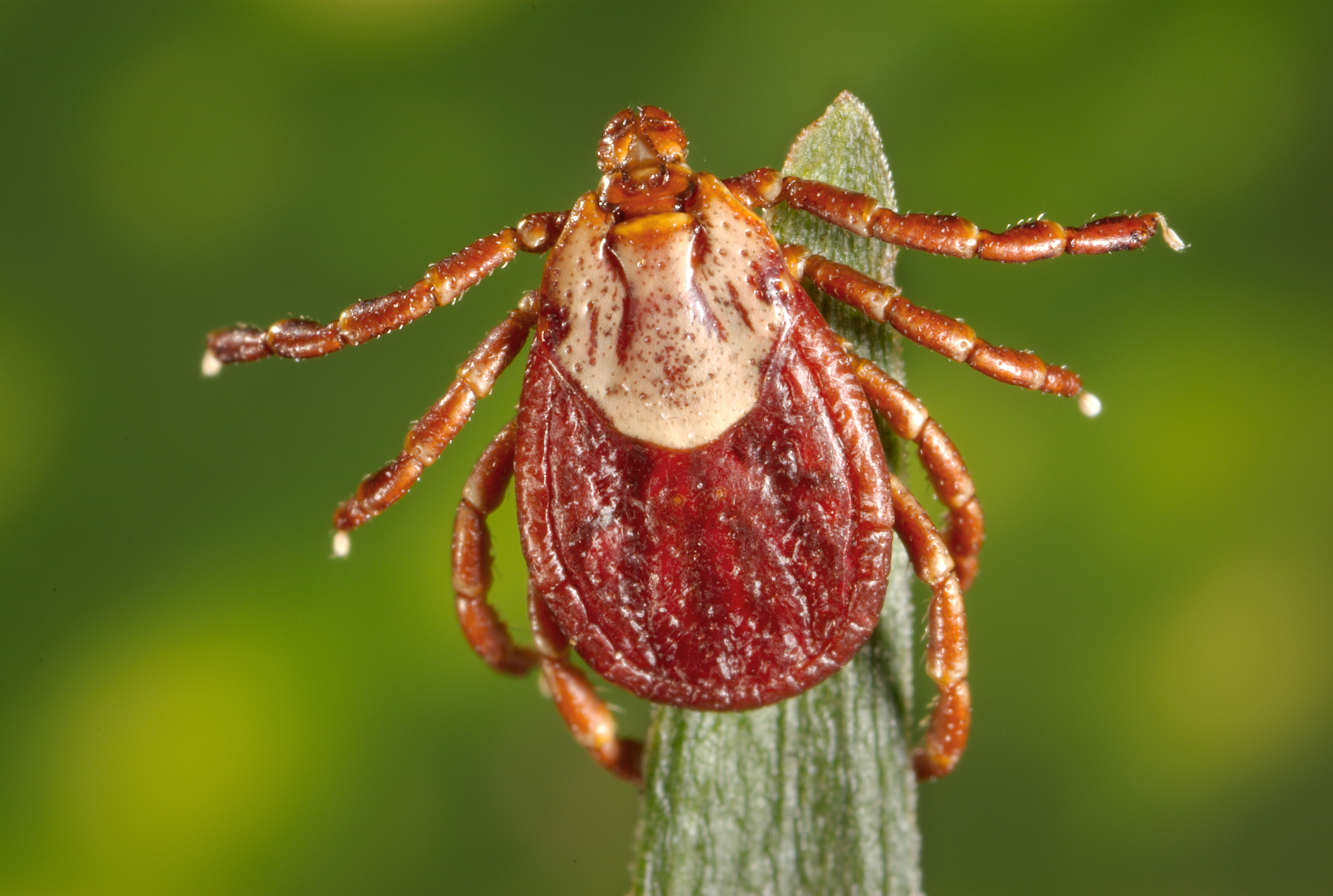
Rocky Mountain Wood Tick

The Rocky Mountain wood tick is usually found attached to a host, but when it is without a host, it hides in cracks and crevices, as well as soil. If, for some reason, the tick is unable to find a host before winter, it will stay under ground cover until spring, when it can resume its search. The behavior of the Rocky Mountain wood tick varies with its life stages: adults are active as early as March, peaking in April and May, while nymphs and larvae are active around April and June, respectively. By late summer or early fall, all these stages typically disappear. Small mammals are common hosts for larvae and nymphs, while adults generally feed on larger mammals such as horses, cattle, and deer.

=== Transmission ===
Colorado tick fever (CTF) is transmitted through the bite of an infected Rocky Mountain wood tick. The ticks become carriers of the CTF virus by feeding on infected reservoir animals like small rodents. Transmission from a tick to a person is the most common cause of infection. Person-to-person transmission is not typical but can occur rarely through blood transfusions. Post-infection, the CTF virus can linger in red blood cells for several months; hence, blood and bone marrow donations are discouraged for six months following infection.

== Diagnosis ==
A combination of clinical signs, symptoms, and laboratory tests can confirm the likelihood of having CTF. Some tests include complement fixation to Colorado tick virus, immunofluorescence for Colorado tick fever, and some other common laboratory findings suggestive of CTF, including leukopenia, thrombocytopenia, and mildly elevated liver enzyme levels.

Detection of viral antibodies on red blood cells is possible.

== Prevention ==
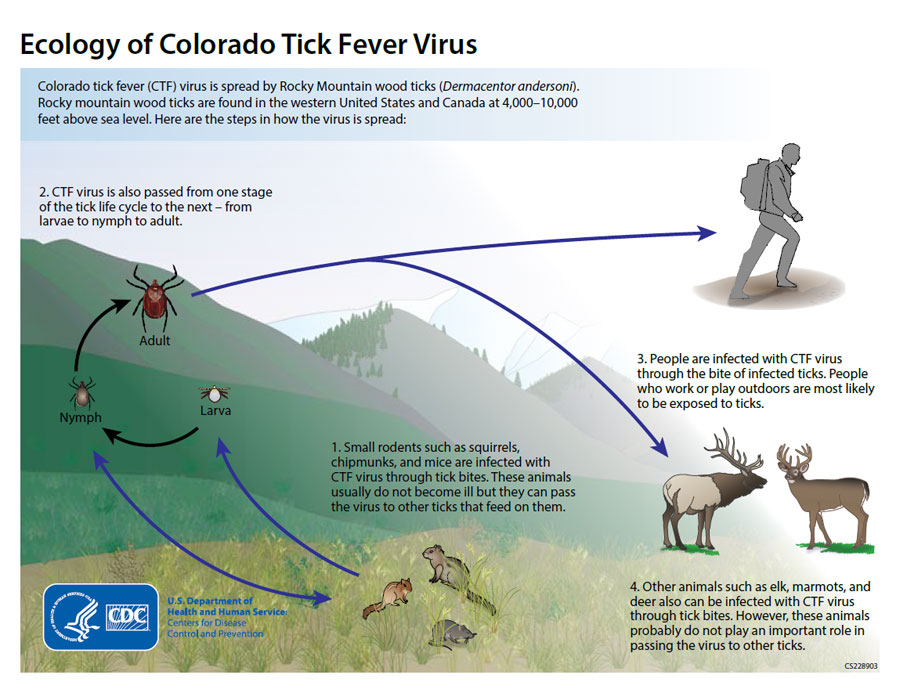
Ecology of Colorado tick fever virus

To avoid tick bites and infection, experts advise:

- Avoid tick-infested areas, especially during the warmer months.
- Wear light-colored clothing so ticks can be easily seen. Wear a long-sleeved shirt, a hat, long pants, and tuck the pant legs into socks.
- Walk in the center of the trails to avoid overhanging grass and brush.
- Clothing and body parts should be checked every few hours for ticks when spending time outdoors in tick-infested areas. Ticks are most often found on the thigh, arms, underarms, and legs. Ticks can be tiny (no bigger than a pinhead). Look carefully for new "freckles".
- The use of insect repellents containing DEET on skin or permethrin on clothing can be effective. Follow the directions on the container and wash off repellents when going indoors.
- Remove attached ticks immediately.

Contracting the CTF virus is thought to provide long-lasting immunity against reinfection. However, it is always wise to be on the safe side and try to prevent tick bites.

== Treatment ==
No specific treatment for CTF is yet available. The first step is to confirm the tick is fully removed from the skin, then acetaminophen and analgesics can be used to help relieve the fever and pain. Aspirin is not recommended for children, as it has been linked to Reye's syndrome in some viral illnesses. Salicylates should not be used because of thrombocytopenia and the rare occurrence of bleeding disorders. People who suspect they have been bitten by a tick or are starting to show signs of CTF should contact their physicians immediately.

=== Tick removal ===
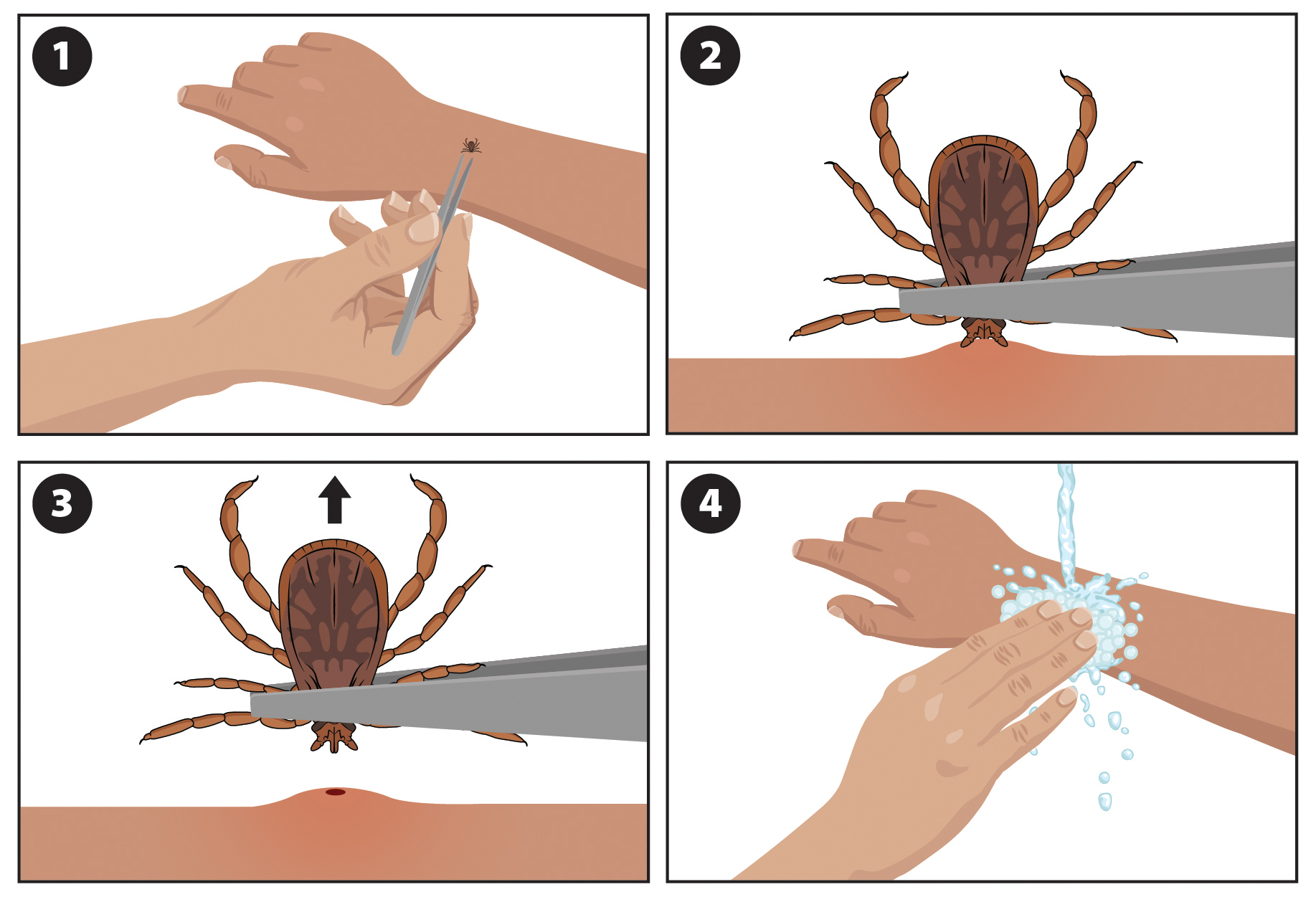
How to remove a tick

Ticks should be removed promptly and carefully with tweezers and by applying gentle, steady traction. The tick's body should not be crushed when it is removed, and the tweezers should be placed as close to the skin as possible to avoid leaving tick mouthparts in the skin. Mouthparts left in the skin can allow secondary infections. Ticks should not be removed with bare hands. Hands should be protected by gloves or tissues and thoroughly washed with soap and water after the removal process.

A match or flame should not be used to remove a tick. This method, once thought safe, can cause the tick to regurgitate, expelling any disease it may be carrying into the bite wound.

== Epidemiology ==
The disease develops during the part of the year when ticks are most active, particularly from March to September, with the highest infections occurring in June. The disease is found almost exclusively in the western United States and Canada, mostly in high mountain areas such as Colorado and Idaho. The CTFV was first isolated from human blood in 1944.
