= Complement fixation test =

- Purpose: detects specific antigen or antibody

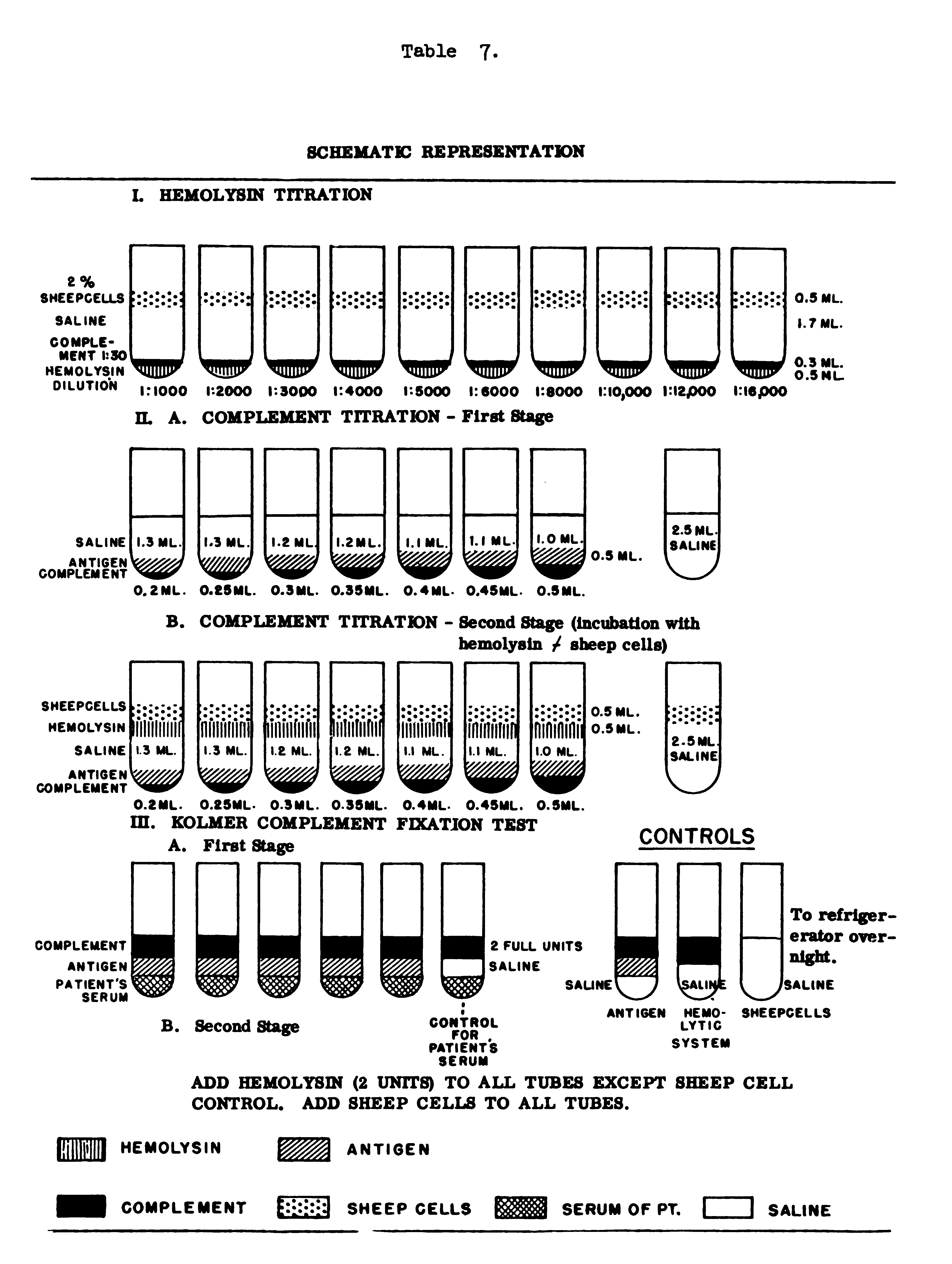
A schematic of a complement fixation test

The complement fixation test is an immunological medical test that can be used to detect the presence of either specific antibody or specific antigen in a patient's serum, based on whether complement fixation occurs. It was widely used to diagnose infections, particularly with microbes that are not easily detected by culture methods, and in rheumatic diseases. However, in clinical diagnostics labs it has been largely superseded by other serological methods such as ELISA and by DNA-based methods of pathogen detection, particularly PCR.

== Process ==
The complement system is a system of serum proteins that react with antigen-antibody complexes. If this reaction occurs on a cell surface, it will result in the formation of trans-membrane pores and therefore destruction of the cell. The basic steps of a complement fixation test are as follows:

1. Serum is separated from the patient.
2. Patients naturally have different levels of complement proteins in their serum. To negate any effects this might have on the test, the complement proteins in the patient's serum must be destroyed and replaced by a known amount of standardized complement proteins.
  1. The serum is heated in such a way that all of the complement proteins—but none of the antibodies—within it are destroyed. (This is possible because complement proteins are much more susceptible to destruction by heat than antibodies.)
  2. A known amount of standard complement proteins are added to the serum. (These proteins are frequently obtained from guinea pig serum.)
3. The antigen of interest is added to the serum.
4. Sheep red blood cells (sRBCs) which have been pre-bound to anti-sRBC antibodies are added to the serum. The test is considered negative if the solution turns pink (ie, there is hemolysis) at this point and positive otherwise.

If the patient's serum contains antibodies against the antigen of interest, they will bind to the antigen in step 3 to form antigen-antibody complexes. The complement proteins will react with these complexes and be depleted. Thus when the sRBC-antibody complexes are added in step 4, there will be no complement left in the serum. However, if no antibodies against the antigen of interest are present, the complement will not be depleted and it will react with the sRBC-antibody complexes added in step 4, lysing the sRBCs and spilling their contents into the solution, thereby turning the solution pink.

== Testing for antigen ==
While detection of antibodies is the most common test format, it is equally possible to test for the presence of antigen. In this case, the patient's serum is supplemented with specific antibody to induce formation of complexes; addition of complement and indicator sRBC is performed as before.

== Semi-quantitative testing ==
The test can be made quantitative by setting up a series of dilutions of patient serum and determining the highest dilution factor that will still yield a positive CF test. This dilution factor corresponds to the titer.
