= Robovirus =

Zoonotic virus

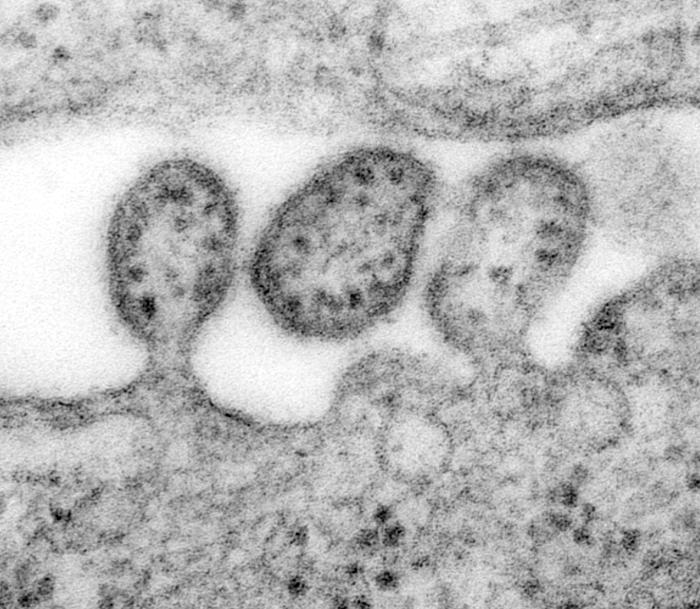
Electron micrograph of the Robovirus responsible for Lassa fever

A rodent-borne virus, abbreviated as robovirus, is a zoonotic virus that is transmitted by a rodent vector.

Roboviruses mainly belong to the virus families Arenaviridae and Hantaviridae. Like arbovirus (arthropod borne) and tibovirus (tick borne) the name refers to its method of transmission, known as its vector. This is distinguished from a clade, which groups around a common ancestor. Some scientists now refer to arbovirus and robovirus together with the term ArboRobo-virus.

== Methods of transmission ==
Rodent borne disease can be transmitted through different forms of contact such as rodent bites, scratches, urine, saliva, and feces as well as contaminated air and food.

=== Viral diseases transmitted by rodents ===
One example of a robovirus is hantavirus, which causes hantavirus pulmonary syndrome. Humans can be infected with Hantavirus Pulmonary Syndrome through direct contact with rodent droppings, saliva, or urine infected with strains of the virus. These components mix into the air and get transmitted when inhaled through airborne transmission.

Lassa virus from the Arenaviridae family causes Lassa hemorrhagic fever and is also a robovirus transmitted by the rodent genus Mastomys natalensis. The multimammate rat is able to excrete the virus in its urine and droppings. These rat are often found in the savannas and forests of Africa. When these rats scavenge and enter households this provides an outlet for direct contact transmission with humans. It has also been found that airborne transmission can occur by engaging in cleaning activities such as sweeping. In some areas of Africa, the Mastomys rodent is caught and used as a source of food. This process can also lead to transmission and infection.

=== Viral diseases indirectly transmitted by rats ===
Colorado tick fever virus causes high fevers, chills, headache, fatigue and sometimes vomiting, skin rash, and abdominal pain. The virus is caused by a Rocky Mountain wood tick (Dermacentor andersoni). It is an arbovirus, but rodents serve as the reservoir. The tick is carried by five species of rodents: the least chipmunk (Eutamias minimus), Richardson's ground squirrel (Urocitellus richardsonii), deer mice (Peromyscus maniculatus), the golden-mantled ground squirrel (Callospermophilus lateraliss), and the Uinta chipmunk (Neotamias umbrinus). The infected tick will be carried by its rodent host and infect another host (animal or human) as it feeds.

=== Factors affecting roboviruses ===
Rodent populations are affected by a number of diverse factors, including climatic conditions. Warmer winters and increased rainfall will make it more likely for rodent populations to survive, therefore increasing the number of rodent reservoirs for disease. Increased rainfall accompanied by flooding can also increase human to rodent contact Global climate change will affect the distribution and prevalence of roboviruses. Inadequate hygiene and sanitation, as seen in some European countries, also contribute to increase rodent populations and higher risks of rodent borne disease transmission.
