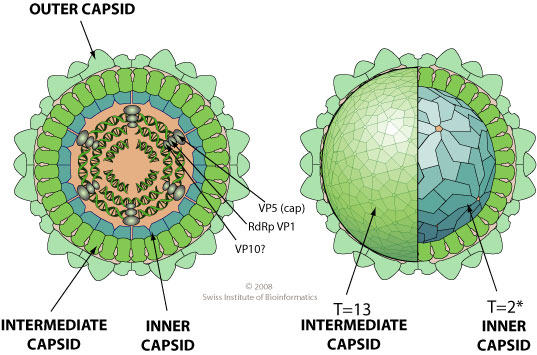
- Coltivirus virion.

Virus classification
- (unranked): Virus
- Realm: Riboviria
- Kingdom: Orthornavirae
- Phylum: Duplornaviricota
- Class: Resentoviricetes
- Order: Reovirales
- Family: Spinareoviridae
- Genus: Coltivirus

= Coltivirus =

Genus of viruses

Coltivirus is a genus of viruses (belonging to the Spinareoviridae family) that infects vertebrates and invertebrates. It includes the causative agent of Colorado tick fever. Colorado tick fever virus can cause a fever, chills, headache, photophobia, myalgia, arthralgia, and lethargy. Children, in particular, may develop a hemorrhagic disease. Leukopenia with both lymphocytes and neutrophils is very common for Colorado tick fever virus. In either case, the infection can lead to encephalitis or meningitis.

== Virology ==
Coltivirus is a genus of viruses. Viruses are intracellular parasites that do not have the necessary means to reproduce on their own, so they have instead to hijack the machinery of a host cell. Only then can they synthesize their viral proteins and create progeny. There are two types of viruses, distinguished by their type of genetic material.

DNA viruses have genomes consisting of deoxyribonucleic acid (or DNA), while RNA viruses, like Coltivirus, have an RNA (ribonucleic acid) genome, which is segmented (multipartite).

== General description ==
Ixodes ricinus range map, the European Eyach virus vector

The name "Coltivirus" is derived from the type species of the genus, the Colorado tick fever virus ("Colorado tick"). Coltivirus is in the family Spinareoviridae. Coltivirus and the related genus Orbivirus together contain about 109 serotypes, and only four of these cause human disease. Ticks are the main vectors of coltiviruses. Colorado tick fever was originally recorded in the 19th century, and today it is one of the most common tick-borne diseases in the United States.

The European Eyach virus and the Colorado tick fever virus are known relatives due to cognate genes, 55% to 88% of amino acid similarity, and similarities at the microscopic level that cannot be distinguished. To find these similarities, a genome sequence analysis was completed. One theory of how the European Eyach virus is proposed to have come about in Europe is by the migration of lagomorphs from North America over fifty million years ago. Since then, the virus took on some differences, and is now considered its own species of virus. European Eyach virus was isolated in 1976 from Ixodes ricinus ticks in Europe and in 1981 from the same species along with Ixodes ventalloi in 1981.

== Taxonomy ==
The genus contains the following species, listed by scientific name:

- Coltivirus dermacentoris, Colorado tick fever virus
- Coltivirus ixodis, Eyach virus
- Coltivirus kundalense, Kundal virus
- Coltivirus taiense, Tai Forest coltivirus
- Coltivirus tarumizuense, Tarumizu virus

== Other characteristics ==
=== Morphology and physiology ===
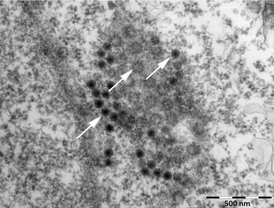
Taï Forest coltivirus (white arrows) with inner and outer icosahedral capsids of around 70 nm in diameter

The Coltivirus virions are about 60–80 nanometers in diameter and are not enveloped, and are generally a spherical shape with icosahedral symmetry. Each virion has two concentric capsid shells surrounding a core of about 50 nanometers in diameter. The surface of the particle is relatively smooth. The virus loses its infectivity when the surrounding fluid becomes acidic, around a pH of three, but is stable when the pH is between seven and eight. It also stops being a threat when the temperature becomes about fifty-five degrees Celsius.

Genus	Structure	Symmetry	Capsid	Genomic arrangement	Genomic segmentation
Coltivirus	Icosahedral	T=13, T=2	Non-enveloped	Linear	Segmented

=== Genome and genomic organization ===
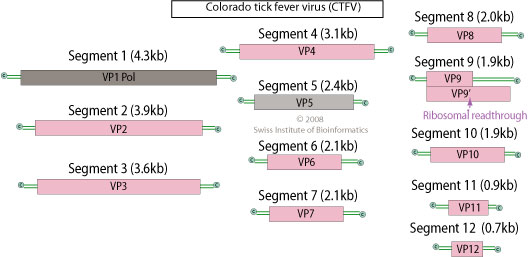
Genome map of species Colorado tick fever virus (CTFV) showing several segments.

Coltiviruses have twelve segments of linear, double-stranded RNA. When the genome is processed with gel electrophoresis, the segments migrate as three class sizes (three bands). Each segment is replicated, and the largest segment encodes RNA polymerase. Locations of other proteins along the genome have yet to be determined.

=== Pathogenesis and viral reproduction ===
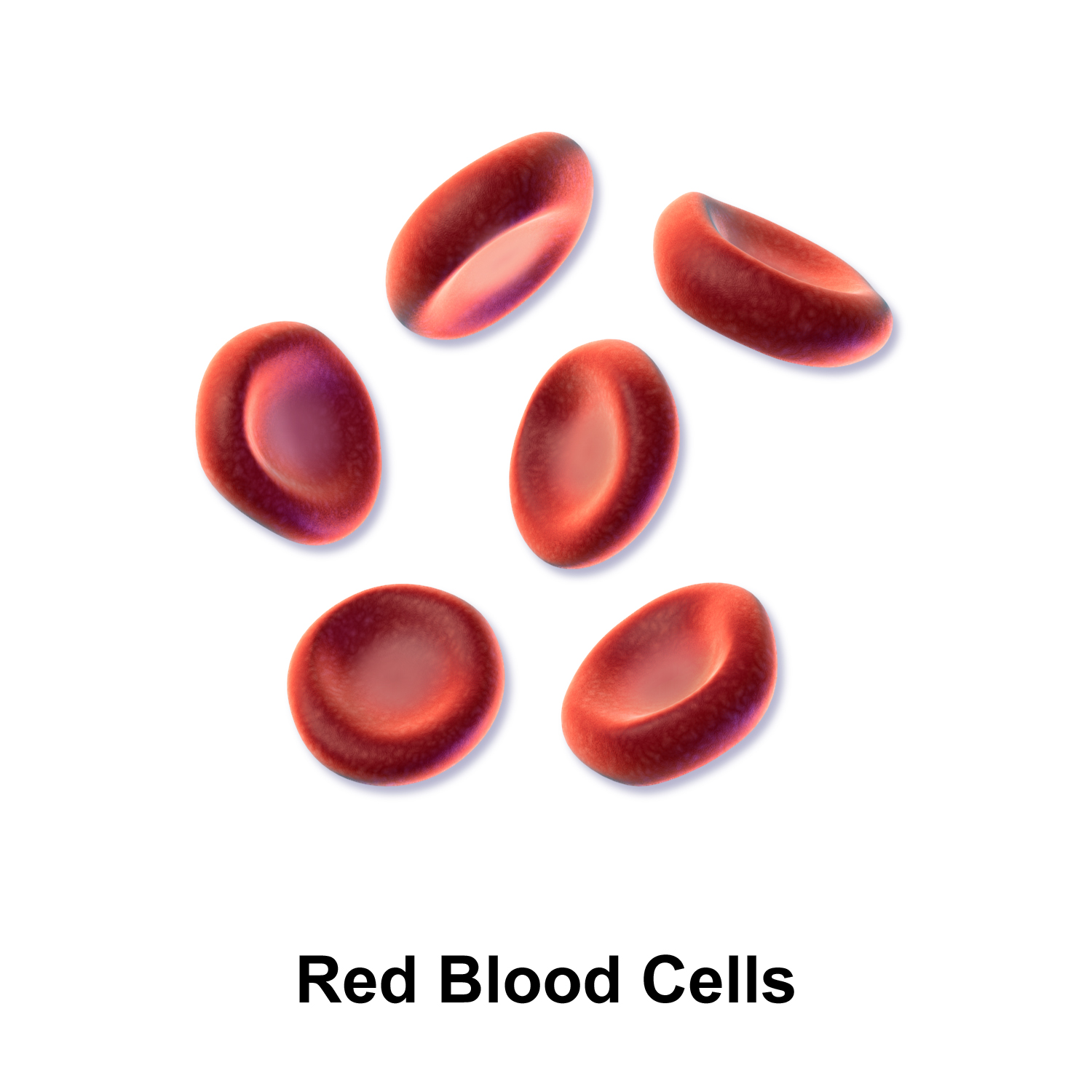
Red blood cells are the target of Colorado tick fever virus

Coltiviruses replicate in the cytoplasm in cells of both arthropods and vertebrates, but they are only transmitted by the arthropods. When the virus replicates, the virion outer shell has to be removed in order for RNA polymerase to be activated to continue the replication of the virion's RNA. Reassortment of the RNA segments in progeny is common, and this plays a role in some of the genetic diversity between the serotypes. Sometimes, this can lead to fast changes in the properties of the viruses.

The main species of Coltivirus, Colorado tick fever virus (CTF), infects the Rocky Mountain wood tick (Dermacentor andersoni). This species of tick can be found in areas with shrubs, lightly wooded locations, grasslands, and on hiking or biking trails. All life stages of this tick can infect vertebrates with Colorado tick fever virus (larva, nymph, and adult). Unfortunately, mature D. andersoni prefer to feed on medium or large mammals that are walking around the knee-high plants. Oftentimes, this infection takes place when the tick larvae feed on rodents, like squirrels, that are already infected with virus. The tick's saliva then contains the virus, and it becomes infectious for life. The adult tick then transmits the virus to humans through a bite, where it infects bone marrow cells.

The virus replicates in those bone marrow cells, which disrupts the development and replication of leukocytes (white blood cells), eosinophils, and basophils. Because of this, thrombocytopenia could also a potential result. Erythrocytes, which are enucleated red blood cells, seem to be infected while they are erythroblasts, their nucleated precursor stage. The virus stays in these red blood cells without harming it for up to four months. Here, it is protected from the immune system's attacks. Antibody to the virus is found only about two weeks after symptoms begin to show, but the virus can still be found in blood cells for about six weeks.

Genus	Host details	Tissue tropism	Entry details	Release details	Replication site	Assembly site	Transmission
Coltivirus	Humans; rodents; ticks; mosquitoe	Erythrocytes	Cell receptor endocytosis	Cell death	Cytoplasm	Cytoplasm	Arthropod bite

=== Symptoms and diagnosis of Colorado tick fever virus (CTFV) ===
Colorado tick fever virus can cause a fever, chills, headache, photophobia, myalgia, arthralgia, and lethargy. Children, in particular, may develop a hemorrhagic disease. Leukopenia with both lymphocytes and neutrophils is very common for Colorado tick fever virus. In either case, the infection can lead to encephalitis or meningitis.

For diagnosis, the erythrocytes can be isolated by injecting them into a tissue culture and checking to see if they are infected. Also, the antigen for Colorado tick fever virus can be identified using the immunofluorescence microscopy. In this method, the antigens on the surface of the erythrocytes are marked with fluorescence and examined under a fluorescence microscope.

=== Epidemiology and control ===
Range map of Dermacentor andersoni in the United States

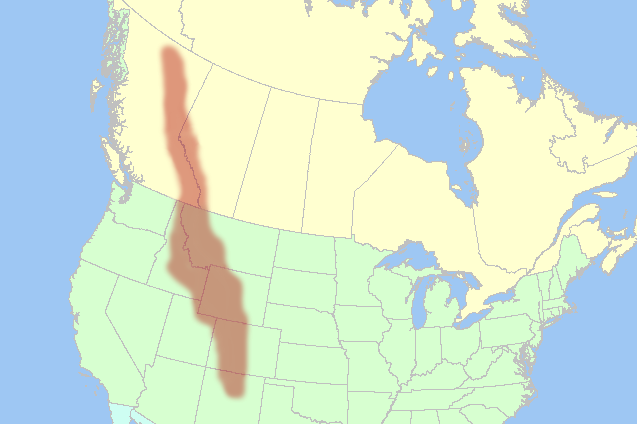
Brown shading represents the Rocky Mountain Range

The distribution of Colorado tick fever virus is in the Rocky Mountain area of the United States at elevations between four and ten thousand feet. Not surprisingly, Colorado tick fever virus can be found in places like California, Colorado, Idaho, Montana, Nevada, Oregon, Utah, Washington, Wyoming, British Columbia, and Alberta. This is roughly the same distribution as the tick that transmits the virus, shown in the adjacent picture.

The virus circulates between ticks and rodents, with humans being the secondary hosts. People at risk for catching the disease are hikers and campers that are in the risk areas. Also, April, May, and June are when the infections mainly occur, because this is the time when the adult ticks are prevalent in the environment. Unfortunately, this is also when the weather is pleasant for hiking and camping. The best way to avoid getting bitten and catching this disease is wearing long sleeves or pants, avoiding high tick-infested areas, and wearing tick repellent.

=== Treatment ===
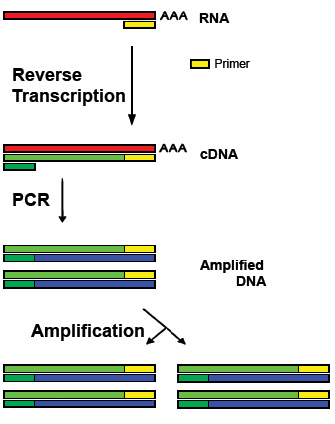
Reverse transcription-polymerase chain reaction (RT-PCR) procedure

Colorado tick fever virus can be detected in a patient with a reverse transcription polymerase chain reaction (RT-PCR), where even a single virion and its genetic material can be detected. The antigens to the virus can also be detected using immunofluorescence. There is currently no known vaccine or treatment available to treat these Coltiviruses, but 3'-fluoro-3'-deoxyadenosine, a nucleoside analog, halts replication of Colorado tick fever virus in vitro.
