= Heartland virus =

Virus classification
- (unranked): Virus
- Realm: Riboviria
- Kingdom: Orthornavirae
- Phylum: Negarnaviricota
- Class: Bunyaviricetes
- Order: Hareavirales
- Family: Phenuiviridae
- Genus: Bandavirus
- Species: Bandavirus heartlandense

Synonyms
- Heartland virus; Heartland bandavirus; Heartland banyangvirus

Tick-borne human pathogen

Heartland virus (HRTV) is a tick-borne phlebovirus of the Bhanja virus serocomplex discovered in 2009. The lone star tick transmits the virus to people when feeding on blood. As of 2022, there has been 60 cases of Heartland virus reported in 14 U.S. states including Arkansas, Indiana, Missouri, Oklahoma, North Carolina, Georgia, Illinois, Iowa, Kansas, New York, Pennsylvania, Virginia, Kentucky, and Tennessee. Symptoms resemble those of two other tick-borne infections ehrlichiosis and anaplasmosis. The reservoir host is unknown, but deer, raccoon, coyotes, and moose in 13 different states have antibody titers against the virus. By 2023, over 50 human infections were reported in at least eleven states.

== History ==
The Heartland virus (HRTV) was discovered in 2009 in northwestern Missouri by Dr. Scott Folk of Heartland Regional Medical Center in St. Joseph, Missouri. The virus was first proven to infect humans in June 2009 when two farmers, living 60 miles (97 km) apart, presented with fever, fatigue, diarrhea, thrombocytopenia, and leukopenia. The Lone Star Tick transmits the virus to people when feeding on blood.

== Classification ==
The Heartland virus is part of the Bunyaviricetes class of viruses which contain 3 segments of −ssRNA. The genus of the virus is Bandavirus and the species is the Bandavirus heartlandense. Segmented RNA consists of three parts described as Small (S), Medium (M), and Large (L) segments. Small segment encodes the nucleocapsid, medium segment encodes a polypeptide cleaved into two surface glycoproteins (Gc and Gn) vital for viral entry, and large segment encodes the RNA-dependant RNA polymerase. The Gc glycoprotein found in the Heartland virus forms into a fusion protein conformation similar to the severe fever with thrombocytopenia syndrome virus (SFTSV). SFTSV is a tick-borne virus seen in East Asia with similar clinical symptoms as the Heartland virus.

== Transmission ==
In 2013, researchers from the CDC and Missouri Western State University first isolated the Heartland virus (HRTV) from the Lone Star Tick (Amblyomma americanum). As of 2013, work continued to identify the reservoir host, as HRTV has not been isolated from any wild or domestic animals, though many white-tailed deer and raccoons from northwestern Missouri had antibodies to HRTV, suggesting that they may be hosts.

In a 2015 retrospective study, convenience samples of wild animal sera from deer, raccoons, coyotes, and moose had antibodies against HRTV. They lived in thirteen states: Florida, Georgia, Illinois, Indiana, Kansas, Kentucky, Missouri, North Carolina, Tennessee, Texas, New Hampshire, Maine, and Vermont. The infections could have occurred as early as 2003, based on the estimated ages of affected deer. Since the Lone Star tick does not occur in northern New England, it is assumed that a second type of tick can carry HRTV.

== Infection ==
=== Signs and symptoms ===
Signs and symptoms include fever over 100.4 °F (38 °C), lethargy (weakness), headaches, muscle pain (myalgia), loss of appetite, nausea, diarrhea, weight loss, joint pain (arthralgia), low white blood cell count (leukopenia) and easy bruising due to a low platelet count (thrombocytopenia). Elevated liver transaminases may also be present.

=== Risk factors ===
Individuals with outdoor (e.g., walking, camping, gardening) exposure in areas where Lone Star tick is endemic were the most affected. Majority of illness onset started between May and September, coinciding with peak tick activity. Tick bites were reported two weeks before symptom onset.

=== Diagnosis ===
Diagnosis is through the elimination of other causes of infectious diseases with related symptoms like ehrlichiosis and anaplasmosis or if the patient fails to respond to treatment with the antibiotic doxycycline. RT-PCR may then be used to detect viral ssRNA in the blood. Antibody titers against the virus may also be used to indicate infection with the Heartland virus.Serological testing is very important. These include microsphere immunoassays (MIAs) for IgM and IgG immunoglobulins against HRTV which were developed indicating a 95% sensitivity and specificity differentiating between past and recent infections.

=== Treatment ===
Treatment for HRTV is currently only supportive as no antiviral drugs and vaccines have been approved yet. Primary management involves intravenous fluids and pain relief medications. It had been demonstrated that antiviral therapies showed promise in animal models specifically ribonucleoside analog 4’fluororidine showed protection against HRTV in mice by decreasing viral loads when administered after disease onset. Ribavirin and favipiravir both showed efficacy, with favipiravir being a more promising candidate for treatment.

=== Prevention ===
Prevention of HRTV infection focuses on reducing tick exposure in places where virus is present. Recommended measure includes wearing pants and long sleeves to cover body, avoid wooded/bushy areas, applying insect repellents even though DEET-based repellents might not be helpful in repelling ticks. Tick checks are crucial when individual has outdoor exposure. Any attached ticks must be immediately removed using fine-tipped tweezers. Crushing unattached ticks should be avoided to prevent release of pathogens which could enter skin. Currently no vaccine is available however multi-epitope vaccine designed through molecular modeling and immunoinformatics show promising results, but further studies are needed before clinical use.

=== Ecology ===
The primary vector for HRTV is the lone star tick (Amblyomma americanum) which exhibited transstadial and vertical transmission of the virus. White-tailed deer and raccoons showed significant seroprevalence for HRTV antibodies indicating their role as an important reservoirs or maintenance hosts. Climate change and land-use changes have caused the lone star tick to move northeastward increasing human exposure to HRTV. Warming temperatures and habitat destruction increased tick population and shifts in distribution shaping epidemiological trends of HRTV by expanding places where ticks and reservoirs co-exist.

=== Human cases ===
As of November 2022, there has been 60 cases of Heartland virus reported in 14 U.S. states including Arkansas, Indiana, Missouri, Oklahoma, North Carolina, Georgia, Illinois, Iowa, Kansas, New York, Pennsylvania, Virginia, Kentucky, and Tennessee.

Heartland virus cases
Year	Location	Deaths	Cases
2009	Northwestern Missouri	0	2
2012–2013	Missouri, Tennessee	1	6
2014	Missouri, Oklahoma	1	3
2017	Northwestern Arkansas, Indiana	0	3
2023	Maryland/Virginia	1	1
