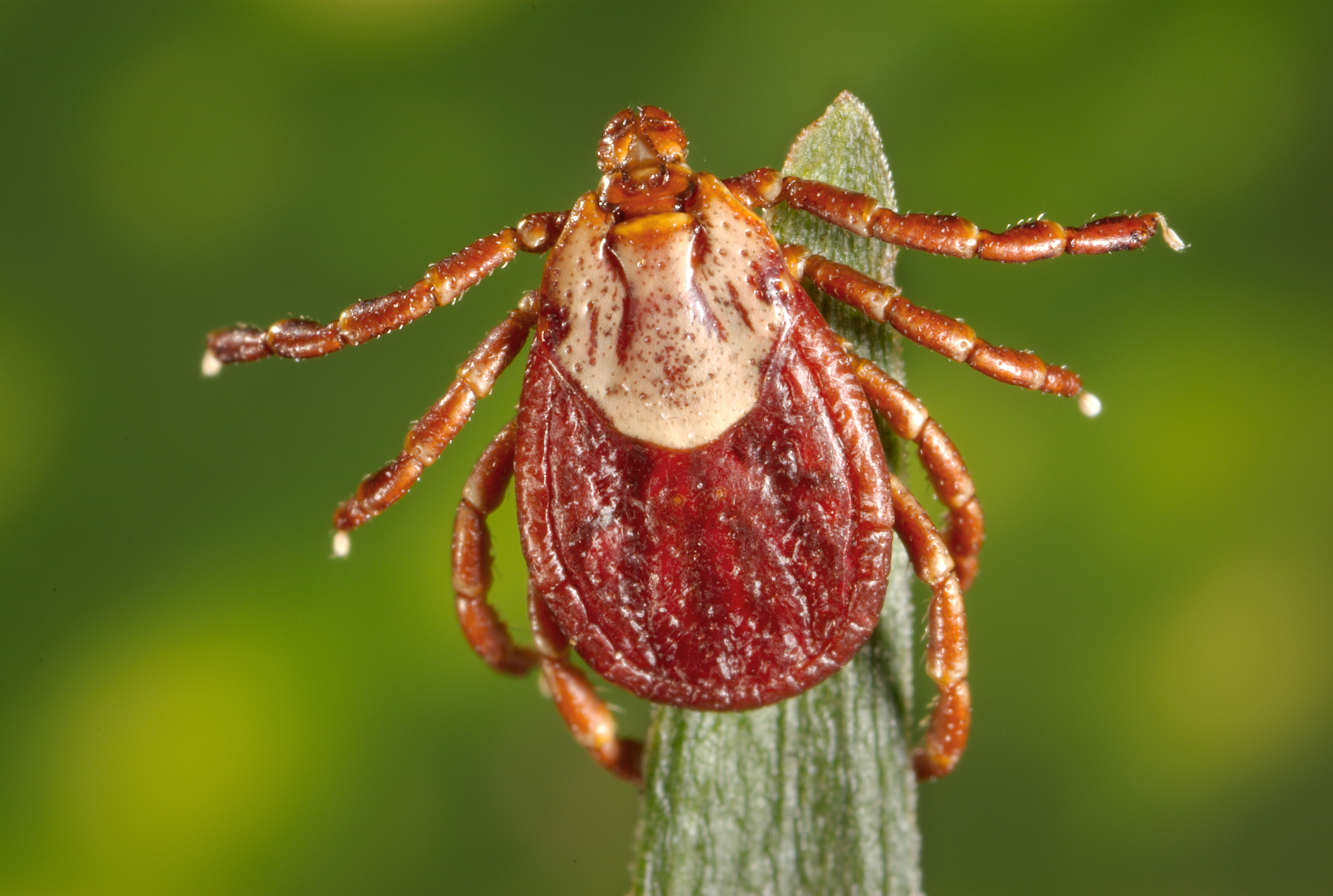

Conservation status
- Secure (NatureServe)

Scientific classification
- Kingdom: Animalia
- Phylum: Arthropoda
- Subphylum: Chelicerata
- Class: Arachnida
- Order: Ixodida
- Family: Ixodidae
- Genus: Dermacentor
- Species: D. andersoni

Binomial name
- Dermacentor andersoni Stiles, 1908

= Dermacentor andersoni =

Species of tick

Dermacentor andersoni, commonly known as the Rocky Mountain wood tick, is a hard tick, or member of the Ixodidae family, with three life stages including larvae, nymph, and finally adult, or, more entomologically, imago. This tick is generally located in the northwest United States and southwest Canada along the Rocky Mountains. This tick is generally a vector for Colorado tick fever, but can also be a vector for Rocky Mountain spotted fever and tularemia. During the larval and nymphal stages, the tick does not feed on humans, but during the adult stage, it will. Prevention of infections associated with these ticks is based on control of exposure to the vector, including wearing proper clothing when in woods/wet areas, and checking oneself thoroughly after returning home. Adult female ticks can feed for 5 to 15 days, thus removing a tick if present is very important.

== Life cycle ==
Dermacentor andersoni is a three-host tick with larval, nymphal, and adult life stages. During each life stage, the tick takes a single blood meal from a mammalian host. The duration of the lifecycle varies between 1 and 3 years and is influenced by factors such as temperature, humidity, and host availability. From the beginning of May through June, ticks' eggs are deposited on moist vegetation after the engorged female ticks drop off their hosts. The female lays about 2500–4000 eggs over 10–33 days. Larval ticks hatch in early summer and begin questing for small mammalian hosts, seeking the stimuli of carbon dioxide, light, temperature, and humidity. A larva may cling to a passing host with the first pair of legs, climb upwards, and then attach with its gnathosoma to the neck or shoulder region. They feed about 2–6 days. After becoming engorged, larvae drop off the host, and molt into nymphs. Nymphs remain dormant for extended periods of time unless stimulated by presence of a host. Nymph feeding behavior is like that of larvae. Nymphs and larvae do not feed on humans, but adults do. If they find a host and attach, the adult females feed continuously throughout that time, around 5–15 days. Males, though, feed for a shorter period and copulate with several, partially fed females that are still on the host. Females drop off the host when fully engorged and seek an area to oviposit. Both sexes die shortly after reproducing.

== Morphology ==
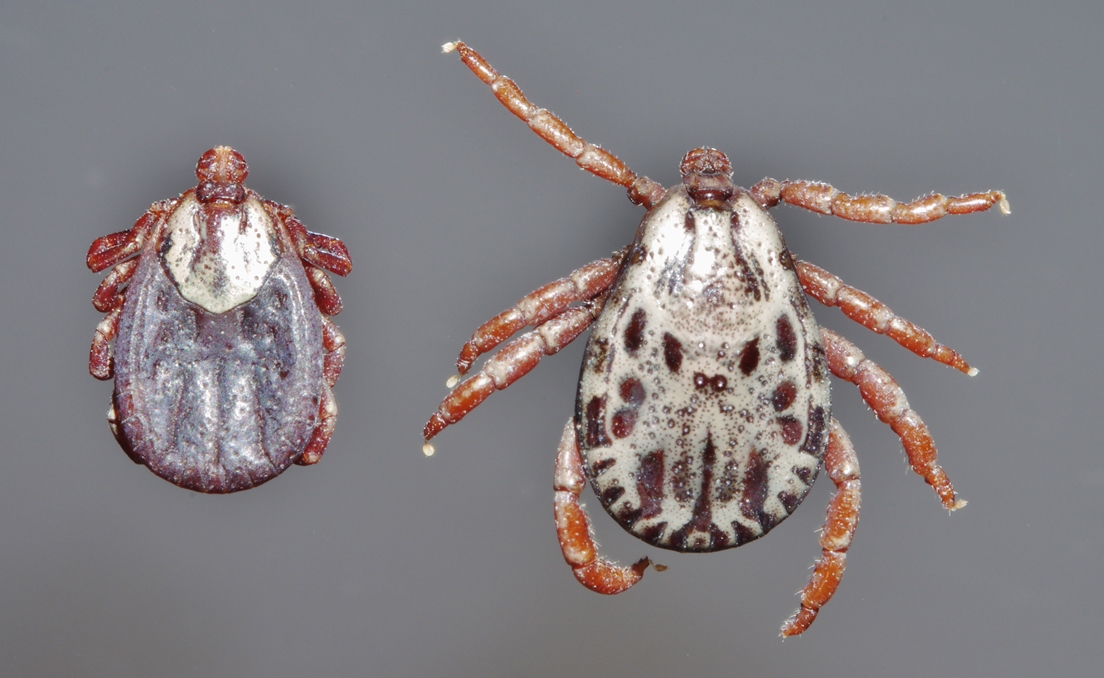
Female (left) and male (right) Dermacentor andersoni

Dermacentor andersoni hard ticks are generally brown or reddish brown in color. Females have a distinct dorsal silver-gray ornamentation that turns more gray when the tick feeds, while males are spotted gray and white with no distinctive shield marking. Their bodies are flat and pear-shaped, ranging from 2.0 to 5.3 mm in length, and have 11 festoons on their lower dorsal portion. This species is sexually dimorphic; females are generally larger and can increase their size by nearly three times when fully engorged. This species is also polymorphic, with much physical variation between individuals. Features that distinguish this species from other ticks include the number and size of goblets, which are used for respiration on its spiracular plates; D. andersoni typically has 100–200 goblets on average. This is only observable with a light microscope.

== Disease transmission ==
These ticks are generally a vector for Colorado tick fever and can possibly be a vector for Rocky Mountain spotted fever and tularemia. However, the related species, D. variabilis is more likely to be a vector for Rocky Mountain spotted fever than D. andersoni. As stated above, D. andersoni is generally located in the northwestern USA and southwestern Canada, whereas D. variabilis is generally located in the eastern USA. The border separating these two species could be considered to be the Missouri River. Thus, if one were to find a Dermacentor tick on oneself when west of the Missouri River, the risk for Colorado tick fever would be higher than for Rocky Mountain spotted fever. The tick can become infected with a disease by feeding on a small mammal during its larval or nymphal stage and can generally be a vector in its nymphal or adult stage. In addition to transmitting the infectious organisms above, D. andersoni can transmit a neurotoxin leading to tick paralysis.

== See also ==
- Ticks of domestic animals
