= Toscana virus =

Virus classification
- (unranked): Virus
- Realm: Riboviria
- Kingdom: Orthornavirae
- Phylum: Negarnaviricota
- Class: Bunyaviricetes
- Order: Hareavirales
- Family: Phenuiviridae
- Genus: Phlebovirus
- Species: Phlebovirus toscanaense

Synonyms
- Toscana phlebovirus

Species of virus

Toscana virus (TOSV) is an arbovirus (arthropod-borne virus) belonging to Bunyaviricetes, a class of negative-stranded, enveloped RNA viruses. The virus can be transmitted to humans by the bite of an infected sandfly of the genus Phlebotomus. Toscana is not normally associated with disease, as indicated by high seroprevalence rates (up to 25%) in endemic areas, but in common with other sandfly transmitted viruses such as Naples virus and Sicilian virus, infection may result in Pappataci fever, an illness with mild fever, headache and myalgia. In serious cases that go undiagnosed, acute meningitis, meningoencephalitis and encephalitis may occur. There is no specific treatment for infection, so treatment is supportive, reducing the severity of symptoms until the immune system has cleared the infection.

The virus is found in most countries that border the Mediterranean Sea, with the highest incidence in Italy. Infection rates peak during the summer time as sandfly populations grow more abundant.

== Virology ==
=== Structure and genome ===
TOSV has a spherical, enveloped body with an 80–120 nm diameter. The genome is encased in a nucleocapsid and consists of negative-sense RNA broken into three segments, termed L, M and S. L is about 6,400 nucleotides in length, M about 4,200 nucleotides in length, and S about 1,900 nucleotides in length. L encodes for the viral polymerase, M encodes for structural glycoproteins and S encodes for nucleic proteins.

== Diagnosis ==
Laboratory diagnosis of TOSV infection can be performed through the use of ELISA, immunofluorescence and/or neutralization tests, but reverse transcription, real-time polymerase chain reaction assays are preferred because they are less time-consuming and reduce the risk of contamination.

== History ==
Toscana virus (TOSV) was first isolated in 1971 from Phlebotomus perniciosus and Phlebotomus perfiliewi in Monte Argentario (Grosseto, Tuscany).
