= Candiru virus =

Virus classification
- (unranked): Virus
- Realm: Riboviria
- Kingdom: Orthornavirae
- Phylum: Negarnaviricota
- Class: Bunyaviricetes
- Order: Hareavirales
- Family: Phenuiviridae
- Genus: Phlebovirus
- Species: Phlebovirus candiruense

Synonyms
- Candiru phlebovirus; Chandiru virus

Species of virus

Candiru virus (CDUV) is a species of virus in the genus Phlebovirus. It has symptoms similar to Malaria, Dengue fever and other tropical diseases. Like other Phleboviruses it is believed to be spread through mosquitos, ticks and phlebotomine sandflies.

There are three strains under the Candiru species: the Candiru virus, the Morumbi virus and the Serra Norte virus. They are all self limiting fevers which were first discovered in Brazil.

== Related strains ==
CDUV forms a serocomplex of related viruses with other phlebovirus strains (not italicized) and species (italicized), including:

- Alenquer virus
- Ariquemes virus
- Echarate virus
- Itaituba virus
- Jacunda virus
- Maldonado virus
- Morumbi virus
- Mucura virus
- Nique virus
- Oriximina virus
- Serra Norte virus
- Turuna virus

The serocomplex, CDUV, Alenquer, Echarate, Maldonado, Morumbi, and Serra Norte were isolated from people experiencing febrile illness, whereas the others were isolated from mosquitoes and sandflies.

== Symptoms ==
Like most Phlebovirus strains, the majority of cases are thought to be asymptomatic; however common symptoms for Candiru virus (and many other Phlebovirus diseases) include: fever; malaise; anorexia (symptom); abdominal symptoms; photophobia; myalgia; coryza; arthralgia; prostration and rashes.
