= PTV =

PTV may refer to:

== Television ==
- "PTV" (Family Guy), a 2005 Family Guy episode
- PTV (PBS), a temporary branding of PBS Kids, used from 1994 to 1999
- PTV (Thailand) or People's Television, a Thailand-based satellite television station
- Pakistan Television Corporation, a state-run broadcaster of Pakistan
  - PTV Home, a cable and satellite entertainment channel
  - PTV News, a 24-hour state news channel
- People's Television Network, a government-owned broadcaster in the Philippines
  - PTV News (TV program), TV news show run by the broadcaster
- Paramount Television, a defunct American television production/distribution company (now CBS Television Studios)
- Personal televisions, screens located in seat-backs or armrests on passenger aircraft
- Prime7, formerly Prime Television, an Australian television network
  - PTV (TV station), a television station in Mildura, Victoria, Australia, which is part of Prime7
- People's Television (Montserrat), a television station in Montserrat

== Music ==
- Pierce the Veil, an American post-hardcore/experimental rock band
- Psychic TV, a video art and music group

== Other ==
- PTV (car), a microcar built in Manresa, Spain
- Passenger Transfer Vehicle, a type of mobile lounge used at some airports
- PTV Group, a German software company specializing in traffic and transportation planning
- Pactiv (NYSE: PTV0), a manufacturer of Hefty products and packaging
- Particle tracking velocimetry, a technique to measure velocity of particles
- Public Transport Victoria, which oversees public transport in Victoria, Australia
- Punta toro, a virus
- Protein-truncating variants (genetic mutations which cut short protein recipes; often especially harmful)
