= Sandfly fever Sicilian virus =

Virus classification
- (unranked): Virus
- Realm: Riboviria
- Kingdom: Orthornavirae
- Phylum: Negarnaviricota
- Class: Bunyaviricetes
- Order: Hareavirales
- Family: Phenuiviridae
- Genus: Phlebovirus
- Species: Phlebovirus siciliaense

Synonyms
- Sicilian phlebovirus

Species of virus

Sandfly fever Sicilian virus is a phlebovirus associated with sandfly fever. It is related to the Naples and Toscana viruses, which also cause sandfly fever.

== Discovery ==
The virus was discovered in Palermo, Sicilia, Italy where it affected troops of the World War II Allied Army Forces after the 1943 Sicily landings.

== Clinical ==
Sandfly fever is a nonfatal influenza-like illness. The incubation period is 3–6 days, and signs and symptoms include high fever that lasts 3–74 hours, malaise, abdominal pain, headache, severe retro-orbital pain, lower back pain, photophobia, and anorexia. Marked leukopenia may occur. Patients may also experience transient diarrhea or constipation with abdominal discomfort. The only sandfly fever virus known to be neurotropic is Toscana virus. However, there have been a report of encephalitis and aseptic meningitis associated with SFSV.

Treatment is supportive but ribavirin may be beneficial in severe or rapidly decompensating cases.

There is little or no serologic cross-reactivity between sandfly fever viruses. Infection can be confirmed through serologic IgM testing.

== Epidemiology ==
The virus is found in the Mediterranean, Middle East, and parts of central and southern Asia, such as Italy, Egypt, Pakistan, Iran, Cyprus, Algeria, and Turkey. The peak incidence occurs in warm months, especially August, when the Phlebotomus papatasi sandfly vectors, which transmit the virus during blood feeding, are most active. One study has suggested that living near wastewater treatment facilities and the presence of livestock inside the home are risk factors for infection.
