= ADRV =

ADRV may refer to:

- Anti-doping rules violation; see doping in sport
- Adria virus, known as ADRV, a viral infection present in Albania and Greece
- Rotavirus B, also known as adult diarrhea rotavirus
- Crash Worship, known in Spanish as Adoración de rotura violenta a music and performance group
