= Saint Abb's Head virus =

St. Abbs Head virus

Virus classification
- (unranked): Virus
- Realm: Riboviria
- Kingdom: Orthornavirae
- Phylum: Negarnaviricota
- Class: Bunyaviricetes
- Order: Hareavirales
- Family: Phenuiviridae
- Genus: Phlebovirus
- Virus: St. Abbs Head virus

Strain of Uukuniemi phlebovirus

St. Abbs Head virus (SAHV) is a virus in the genus Phlebovirus, order Bunyavirales. It is named after St Abb's Head, Scotland, where it was isolated from its vector, the tick Ixodes uriae.
