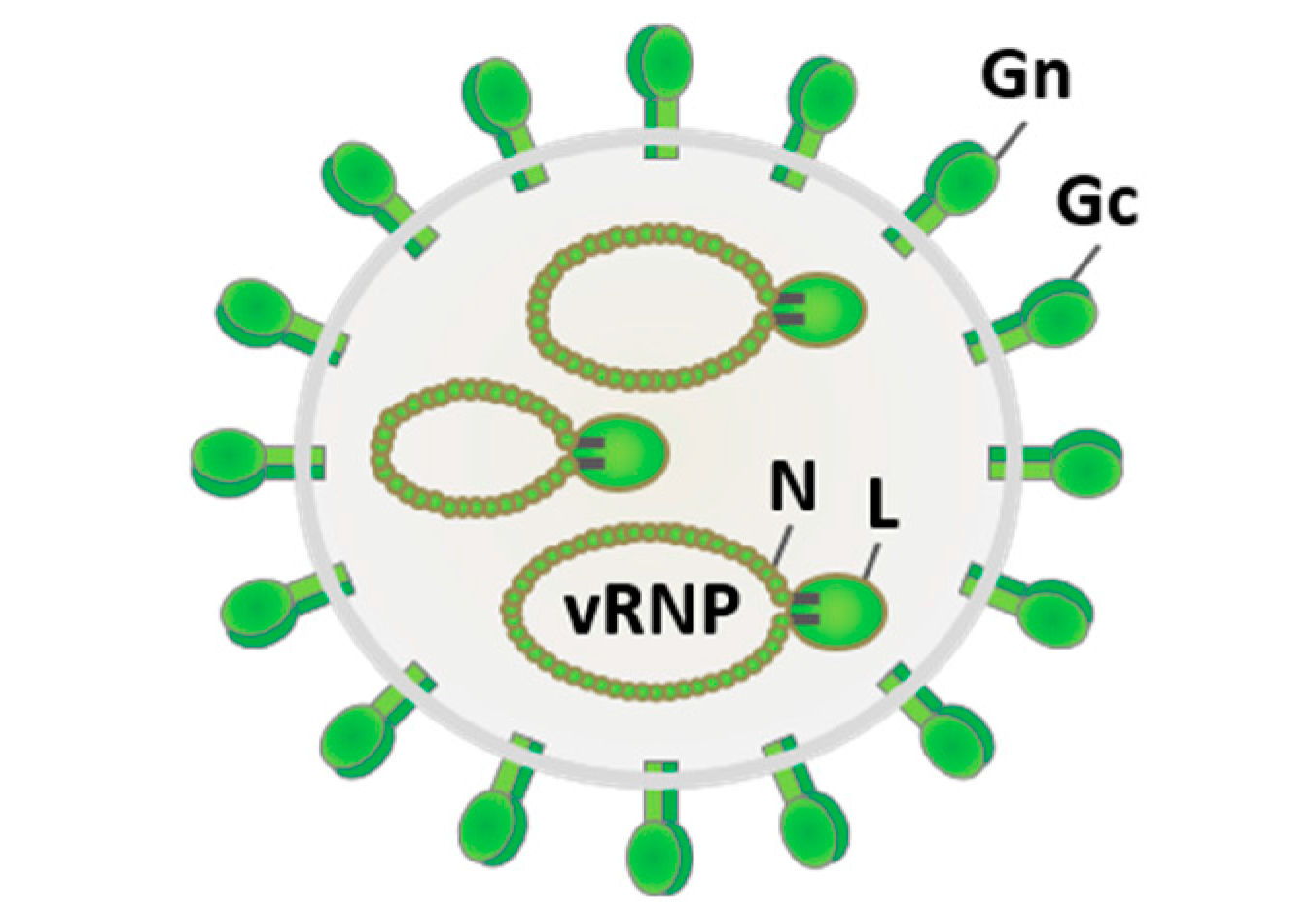

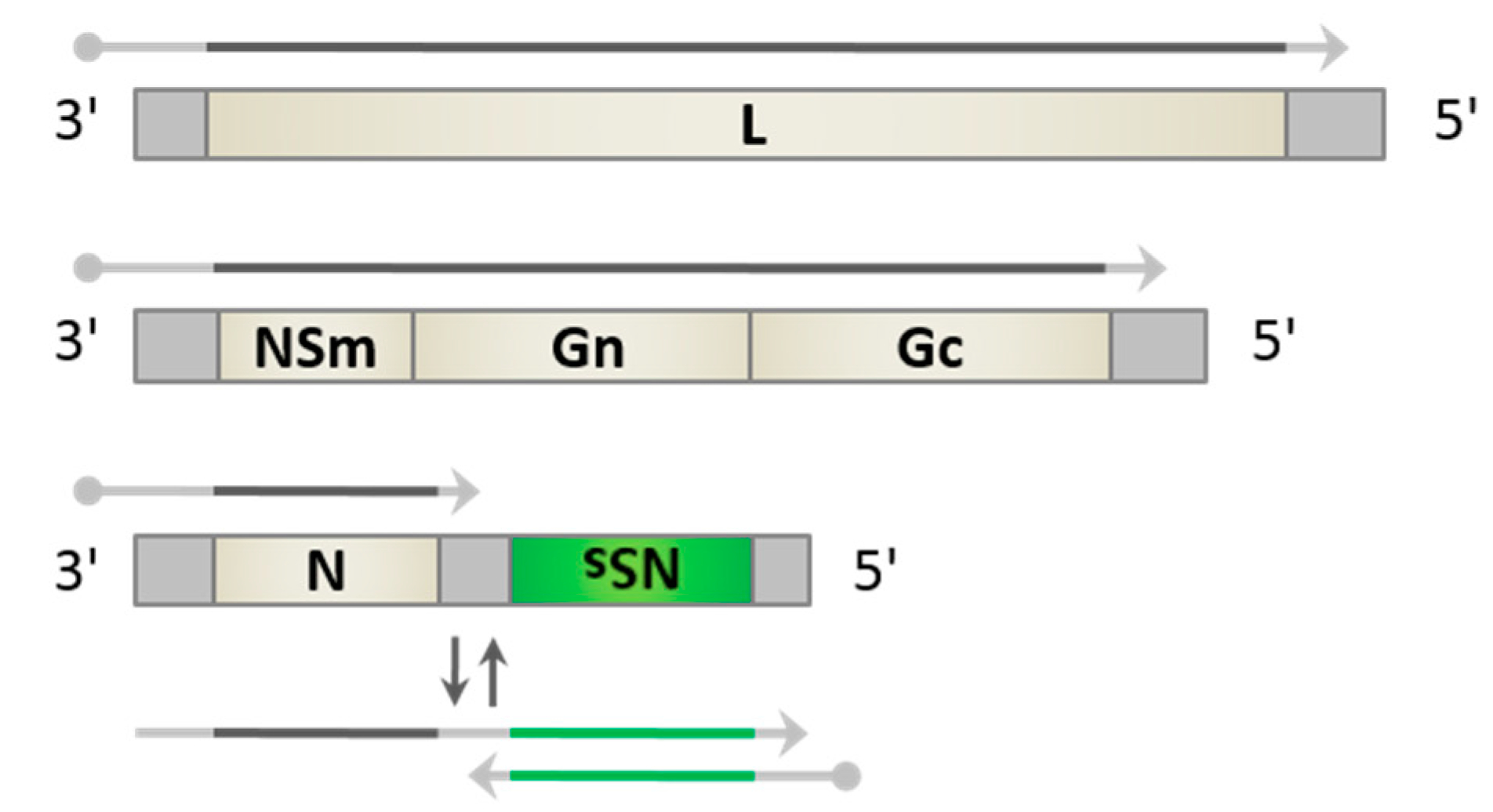
- Prototypic phlebovirus virion and genome organization.

Virus classification
- (unranked): Virus
- Realm: Riboviria
- Kingdom: Orthornavirae
- Phylum: Negarnaviricota
- Class: Bunyaviricetes
- Order: Hareavirales
- Family: Phenuiviridae
- Genus: Phlebovirus

Species
- See text

= Phlebovirus =

Genus of viruses

Phlebovirus is a genus of viruses in the family Phenuiviridae in the order Hareavirales. The genus contains 71 species. It derives its name from Phlebotominae, the vectors of member species sandfly fever Naples virus, which is said to be ultimately from the Greek phlebos, meaning "vein". The proper word for "vein" in Ancient Greek is, however, phleps (φλέψ).

== Virology ==
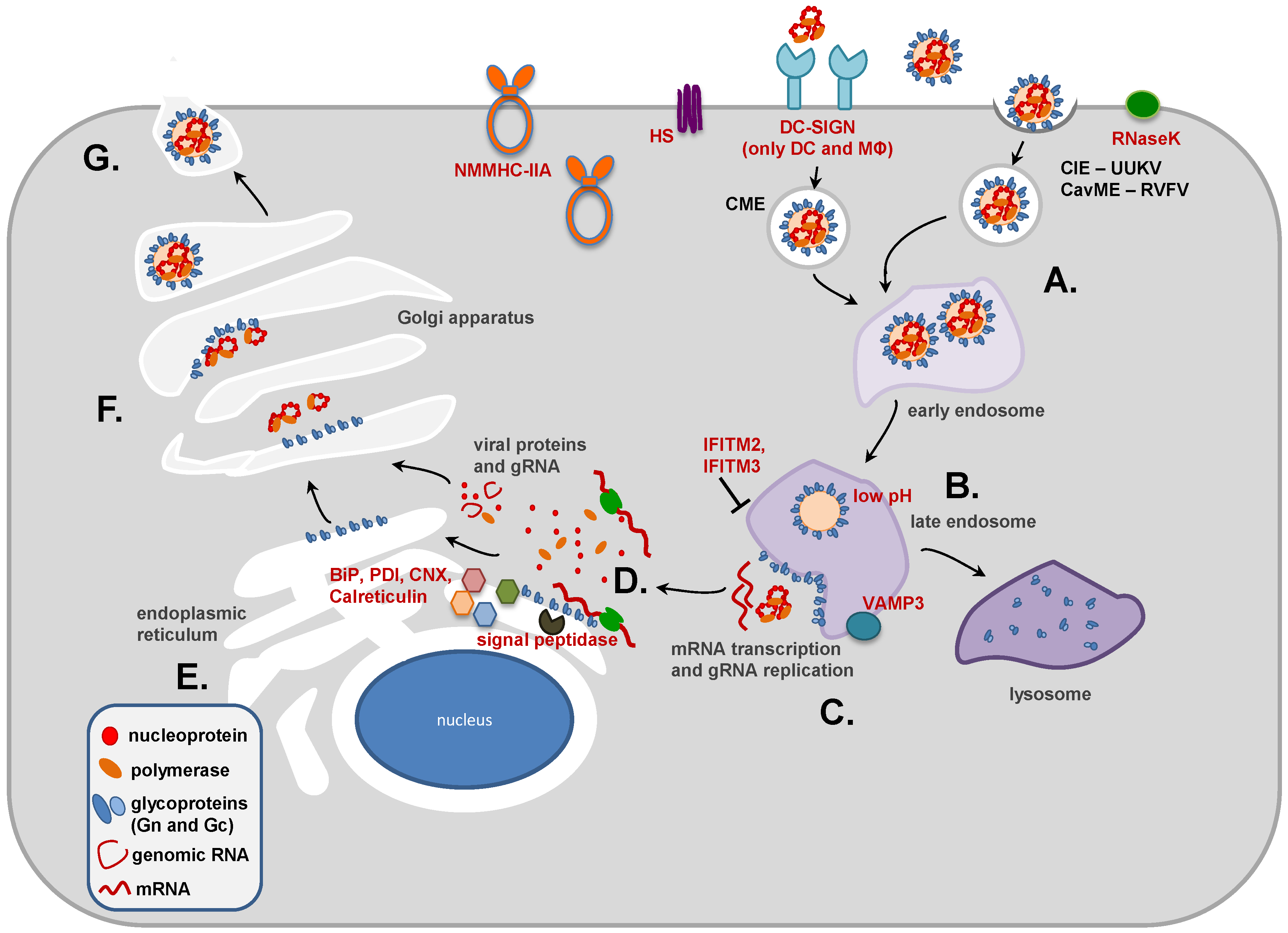
Replication cycle of phleboviruses.

Phleboviruses are viruses with a negative-sense RNA genome consisting of three segments. The small segment (S) codes for the viral N protein and a non structural protein, NSs via an ambisense coding strategy. The medium-sized segment (M) codes for a precursor of the viral glycoproteins and non-structural components. The product of the largest segment (L) is the viral RNA-dependent RNA polymerase.

== Replication ==
Phleboviruses replicate in a seven-step process. First, the cellular attachment is driven through the glycoprotein interactions with host cells. Examples of this are Dendritic Cell-Specific Intercellular Adhesion Molecule-3-Grabbing Non-Integrin (DC-SIGN), heparan sulfate (HS), or Non-Muscle Myosin Heavy Chain (NMMHC-IIA). Second, in the late endosome, the low pH causes fusion activity in the membrane of the Gc protein. Uukuniemi virus (UUKV) penetration is promoted by the expression of vesicle-associated membrane protein 3 (VAMP3). Additionally, the fusion of Rift Valley fever virus (RVFV) in late endosomes is inhibited by the interferon-induced transmembrane proteins 2 and 3 (IFITIM2 and IFITIM3). Third, the viral and endosomal membranes are fused to allow for the release of the viral ribonucleoprotein complexes into the cytoplasm (Also the site of viral transcription and replication). Fourth, the precursor protein, Gn/Gc, is translated at the rough endoplasmic reticulum (ER). This precursor protein is cleaved by signal peptidase. Synthesis of the viral nucleoprotein and viral polymerase in the cytoplasm combines with the newly formed genomic RNA (gRNA) ribonucleic protein complexes (RNP). Fifth, two ER chaperones, binding immunoglobulin protein (BiP) and calnexin, are required to ensure proper folding of GN/Gc. Gn/Gc are similarly catalyzed by protein-disulfide-isomerase through the formation of disulfide bonds. At the same time, calreticulin prevents any misfolded Gn/Gc from being exported to the Golgi. Sixth, The correctly folded Gn/Gc heterodimers are transported to the Golgi apparatus. The cytoplasmic tails of Gn in the budding process associate with RNPs during this time. Seventh, once the budding of the new virus particles is completed, vesicles that contain the virus are transported to the plasma membrane to be released by exocytosis.

=== Role of Gn and Gc in phlebovirus entry ===
A study of the family Bunyaviridae showed that bunyavirus particles are pleomorphic. This known fact caused some surprise when studies showed that UUKKV and RVFV particles are spherically shaped and highly ordered. The configuration of Gn and Gc proteins in the viral envelope imposes the order of the particle. The viral envelope forms an icosahedral lattice with a triangulation number of 12. Also included in the lattice composition are 110 hexametric and 12 pentameric capsomeres. For RVFV in particular, 720 Gn/Gc heterodimers are included in the capsomeres. In these cases, Gn forms the spikes of the capsomere while Gc is closer to the lipid membrane, thus placing it underneath. The pH surrounding the capsomere ultimately determines its shape. This is largely due to protonation triggering conformational changes in Gc, commonly included with membrane fusion. An assembly model for the RVFV envelope has been proposed which consists of Gc dimers positioned horizontally with respect to the viral membrane. This is known because the RVFV Gc ectodomain is crystallized as a dimer. This is opposed to the virion interior of bunyaviruses which has no matrix protein, and thus, has no defining organization. This means that on the virion surface, the Gc and Gn proteins must be present in a highly ordered placement.

To begin entry, phlebovirus particles bind to various components of the plasma membrane. These components interact with the viral glycoproteins of phlebovirus and regulate entry efficiency. While these components are not crucial to the actual entry of the virus itself, receptors are components of the plasma membrane that bind to the glycoproteins and are critical for entry. In phleboviruses, it was determined that glycan-protein interactions play a crucial role in phlebovirus entry.

Heparan sulfate (HS) is another crucial component aspect in phlebovirus attachment. It is a glycosaminoglycan (GAG), which is an unbranched polysaccharide made of disaccharide repeats, that results in the creation of a proteoglycan. Cell lines with defined glycosylation defects were analyzed and showed that HS is necessary for the entry of RVFV. This was confirmed by the removal of HS using an enzyme. HS is charge-dependent in their interactions with virus particles, and studies showed that there are basic amino acid clusters on the P78 protein that interact with negative sulfate clusters on HS. In comparison, there were no identified HS binding sites on Gn and Gc. The P78 protein is plentiful in RVFV-infected cells in insects, while infected cells in mammals produce significantly less P78 proteins. The P78 protein is much more efficiently produced in RVFV in mosquito cells as it is required for viral spread in mosquitos. Overall, the cell line is heavily dependent on HS in RVFV entry.

A computational study provided evidence that phlebovirus Gc proteins might be class II membrane fusion proteins. Final proof for this theory was given by the elucidation of the ectodomain's structure of RVFV Gc in its pre-fusion status. Gc has three domains with characteristics that resembled other class II proteins. An internal fusion loop was discovered, which is a critical aspect of all class II proteins. The location of a histidine in Gc resembled a pH sensing feature, which matches class II characteristics. Although there were many similarities within the structure of the RVFV Gc and class II proteins, the interface between domains I and II in RVFV Gc is more rigid and bigger than other class II proteins. Additionally, RVFV Gc has more disulfide bridges centralized in different locations than the other compared proteins. However, its overall structure and functionality is most closely resembling a class II membrane fusion protein compared to any other class.

The pH sensing feature in the Gc protein is of note. The membrane fusion activity of the phlebovirus Gc proteins is very dependent on pH, as a low pH triggers the transport of virions into endolysosomes. Elevating intravesicular pH inhibits phlebovirus entry. However, it is still unclear whether Gc proteins must bind to a receptor before being triggered by pH or not.

After the viral and endosomal membranes have been fused together, the L, M, and S genomic segments (associated with viral polymerase) are released into the cytoplasm. This initiates the transcription to genomic RNA into mRNA. Viral proteins begin undergoing translation before the transcription of mRNA has finished. The Gn and Gc phlebovirus proteins are encoded on the M-segment and undergo synthesis. The precursor Gn/Gc protein cannot be detected in a cell already infected with phlebovirus. It only is visible after the expression of the M-segment. If microsomal membranes are present, the precursor is cleaved, indicating cleaving by a host factor during the synthesis of the viral protein. The signal peptidase complex in the ER membrane is responsible for the cleaving of the precursor. This precursor is then translocated into the ER lumen, in which two hydrophobic domains are inserted with a third, cleaved hydrophobic domain in between.

== Emerging group of arthropod-transmitted pathogens ==
Phleboviruses are arboviruses taxonomically split into tick- and dipteran-borne viruses. Phlebotomine sandflies are the primary vectors for dipteran-borne phleboviruses, with Rift Valley fever virus being the exception (RVFV is associated with mosquitoes and has a greater variety in its vector range). Maintenance of the viruses is mainly completed through the vector species by means of vertical (transovarial) transmission. Concerns over the potential introduction of RVFV into susceptible areas has grown due to the increasing spread of vector species. The potential ramifications of this spread could cause massive economic loss through the harming of livestock.

Two new members of phlebovirus as causative agents of traumatic human disease have been identified. In rural China, SFTSV, which is transmitted by ticks, was identified as the result of increased cases of a febrile illness combined with thrombocytopenia, leukenocytopenia, multiple organ dysfunction, and a high case-fatality rate. After this discovery, SFTSV was reported in Japan and Korea as well. North America had a similar case, which was found to be a result of the Heartland virus, which is transmitted by ticks. These two discoveries changed the perception of the effect of tick-borne phleboviruses with regards to public health. These discoveries caused the re-classification of the Bhanja virus (BHAV) into the tick-borne phlebovirus group. Novel associations of phlebovirus diseases have been reported in the Mediterranean area. Examples include the sandfly fever Turkey virus, Adria virus, Granada virus, Adana virus, and Medjerda virus, among others.

The Toscana virus has a high rate of vertical transmission, as demonstrated in sandflies through experimental infection. This suggests that there is an amplified role for vertebrate hosts despite the maintenance in nature coming mainly from sandflies. A sandfly is a name for members of any species or genus of flying, blood-sucking dipteran in sandy areas. For example, "sandfly" in the United States refers to horse flies or members of the family Ceratopogonidae. In other parts of the world, "sandfly" refers to members of the subfamily Phlebotominae within Psychodidae. Two of the three main genera were found in the Old World, Phlebotomus and Sergentomyia, and contain the prominent species that transmit the viral pathogens. The third genus was found in the New World and is called Lutzomyia. Other examples are biting midges, or Austrosimulium, a black fly found in New Zealand.

The result of many of these viruses are some sort of fever. Pappataci fevers, or Phlebotomus fevers, are mild 3-day fevers that are similar to influenza and have a rapid onset. They are most common in endemic areas during the summer months, particularly August, which is when sandflies are active. Some more extreme cases are the Toscana virus, which is associated with meningitis in humans, and the Rift Valley fever virus which has caused wide-spread epidemics in livestock in Africa.

== Clinical significance ==
The following viruses have been linked to disease in humans: Alenquer virus, Bhanja virus, Candiru phlebovirus, Chagres virus, sandfly fever Naples virus, Punta Toro virus, Rift Valley fever virus, sandfly fever Sicilian virus, Toscana virus, Uukuniemi virus, and the sandfly Turkey virus (discovered in China in 2011).

== Taxonomy ==
Phlebovirus is derived from Phlebotominae, which is the taxon of vectors of member species Sandfly fever Naples virus. The name comes from the Greek root phlebos, which means "vein". Serological cross reactivity previously defined species in the genus. A change in classification rules was prompted due to the difficulty in detecting new phlebovirus in serological assays. As a result, viral species are now defined by 95% or greater identity in the amino acid sequences of their respective RNA-dependent RNA plymerase (RdRp). Currently, the genus consists of 67 species. Some of the viruses have other hematophagous arthropods as their main vectors. Examples of this include mosquitos for the Rift Valley fever virus, and the Mukawa virus, which has been isolated from ticks, but remains in Phlebovirus despite the common shift of tick-borne viruses from Phlebovirus to Uukuvirus. In addition to ticks and mosquitos, some phleboviruses have been isolated from vertebrates like rodents in America and opossums or sloths in Africa. This wide variety of sources shows the possible presence of diversified epidemiological cycles.

The genus contains the following species, listed by scientific name and followed by the exemplar virus of the species:

- Phlebovirus adanaense, Adana virus
- Phlebovirus aguacateense, Aguacate virus
- Phlebovirus alcubeense, Alcube virus
- Phlebovirus alenquerense, Alenquer virus
- Phlebovirus almendrasense, Tres Almendras virus
- Phlebovirus alxaense, Alxa tick phlebovirus
- Phlebovirus ambeense, Ambé virus
- Phlebovirus anhangaense, Anhangá virus
- Phlebovirus arumowotense, Arumowot virus
- Phlebovirus baishanense, Mǔdānjiāng phlebovirus
- Phlebovirus bogoriaense, Bogoria virus
- Phlebovirus buenaventuraense, Buenaventura virus
- Phlebovirus bujaruense, Bujaru virus
- Phlebovirus cacaoense, Cacao virus
- Phlebovirus campanaense, Campana virus
- Phlebovirus candiruense, Candirú virus
- Phlebovirus chagresense, Chagres virus
- Phlebovirus claroense, Rio Claro virus
- Phlebovirus cocleense, Coclé virus
- Phlebovirus corfouense, Corfou virus
- Phlebovirus dashliense, Dāshlī virus
- Phlebovirus duraniaense, Durania virus
- Phlebovirus echarateense, Echarate virus
- Phlebovirus embossosense, Embossos virus
- Phlebovirus florisense, Saint-Floris virus
- Phlebovirus gabekense, Gabek forest virus
- Phlebovirus gloriaense, La Gloria virus
- Phlebovirus gordilense, Gordil virus
- Phlebovirus hediense, Hédi virus
- Phlebovirus icoaraciense, Icoaraci virus
- Phlebovirus itaitubaense, Itaituba virus
- Phlebovirus itaporangaense, Itaporanga virus
- Phlebovirus ixcanalense, Ixcanal virus
- Phlebovirus karimabadense, Karimabad virus
- Phlebovirus kiborgochense, Kiborgoch virus
- Phlebovirus leticiaense, Leticia virus
- Phlebovirus limboense, Frijoles virus
- Phlebovirus maldonadoense, Maldonado virus
- Phlebovirus manidae, Pangolin phlebovirus
- Phlebovirus massiliaense, Massilia virus
- Phlebovirus medjerdaense, Medjerda Valley virus
- Phlebovirus monagritaense, Mona Grita virus
- Phlebovirus mukawaense, Mukawa virus
- Phlebovirus mungubaense, Munguba virus
- Phlebovirus napoliense, Sandfly fever Naples virus
- Phlebovirus niqueense, Nique virus
- Phlebovirus ntepesense, Ntepes virus
- Phlebovirus odrenisrouense, Odrénisrou virus
- Phlebovirus oriximinaense, Oriximiná virus
- Phlebovirus pantanalense, Viola virus
- Phlebovirus penablancaense, Peña Blanca virus
- Phlebovirus penshurtense, Penshurt virus
- Phlebovirus perkerraense, Perkerra virus
- Phlebovirus puniqueense, Punique virus
- Phlebovirus riftense, Rift Valley fever virus
- Phlebovirus riograndense, Rio Grande virus
- Phlebovirus salangaense, Salanga virus
- Phlebovirus salehabadense, Salehabad virus
- Phlebovirus saloboense, Salobo virus
- Phlebovirus siciliaense, Sandfly fever Sicilian virus
- Phlebovirus taparaense, Tapará virus
- Phlebovirus tehranense, Tehran virus
- Phlebovirus ticoense, Tico virus
- Phlebovirus toroense, Punta Toro virus
- Phlebovirus torosense, Toros virus
- Phlebovirus toscanaense, Toscana virus
- Phlebovirus turunaense, Turuna virus
- Phlebovirus uriuranaense, Uriurana virus
- Phlebovirus urucuriense, Urucuri virus
- Phlebovirus wuxiangense, Wǔxiāng virus
- Phlebovirus zerdaliense, Zerdali virus

As of 2015, within the Phlebovirus genus there are four genetic groups of tick-borne phleboviruses: the SFTS group, the Bhanja group, the Uukuniemi group, and the Kaisodi group.

== See also ==
- Saint Abb's Head virus
