= Three-day fever =

The term three-day fever may refer to

- Pappataci fever, a vector-borne arboviral infection
- Exanthema subitum, or the sixth disease, a childhood illness
