= United States Army during World War II =

United States Army
- Founded: June 14, 1775
- Country: United States
- Type: Army
- Role: Land warfare
- Part of: United States Armed Forces; Department of the Army
- Headquarters: The Pentagon; Arlington County, Virginia, U.S.
- Motto: "This We'll Defend"
- Colors: Black, gold and white
- Mascot: Army Mules
- Equipment: List of U.S. Army equipment

Commanders
- Commander-in-Chief: President Franklin D. Roosevelt; Harry S. Truman
- Department of War: Harry Hines Woodring; Henry L. Stimson
- Chief of Staff: GEN George C. Marshall

During World War II, the United States Army underwent significant changes and played a crucial role in the conflict, fundamentally shaping its purpose and structure. The primary objective of the U.S. Army during this period was to mobilize and deploy forces to combat Axis powers, including Nazi Germany, Italy, and Japan. This required a vast expansion of personnel and resources, leading to the largest military mobilization in American history up to that point.

In response to the war's demands, the Army implemented several reforms. The establishment of the Selective Service Act in 1940 allowed for the conscription of millions of American men, dramatically increasing the size of the Army from about 190,000 active-duty personnel in 1940 to over 8 million by 1945. Training programs were enhanced, and new units were formed, including specialized divisions like the Army Air Forces, which emphasized the importance of air power against the Axis powers of Adolf Hitler, Benito Mussolini and Hideki Tojo.

The Army also adopted more modern organizational structures and tactics, reflecting lessons learned from earlier conflicts. Innovations in strategy, logistics, and technology were prioritized to improve combat effectiveness. The integration of women into the military through organizations like the WAVES (Women Accepted for Volunteer Emergency Service) and the WACs (Women's Army Corps) marked a significant shift in personnel policy, although racial segregation remained a prominent issue within the forces.

== Command, control and organization ==
At the beginning of the war, the Army and Air Force were under the command of the War Department, which in turn was subordinate to the President. The command structures were the same as those used during World War I. In 1940, there were six branches within the Army that were considered combat arms: Infantry, Cavalry, Field Artillery, Coast Artillery, Air Corps and the Corps of Engineers.

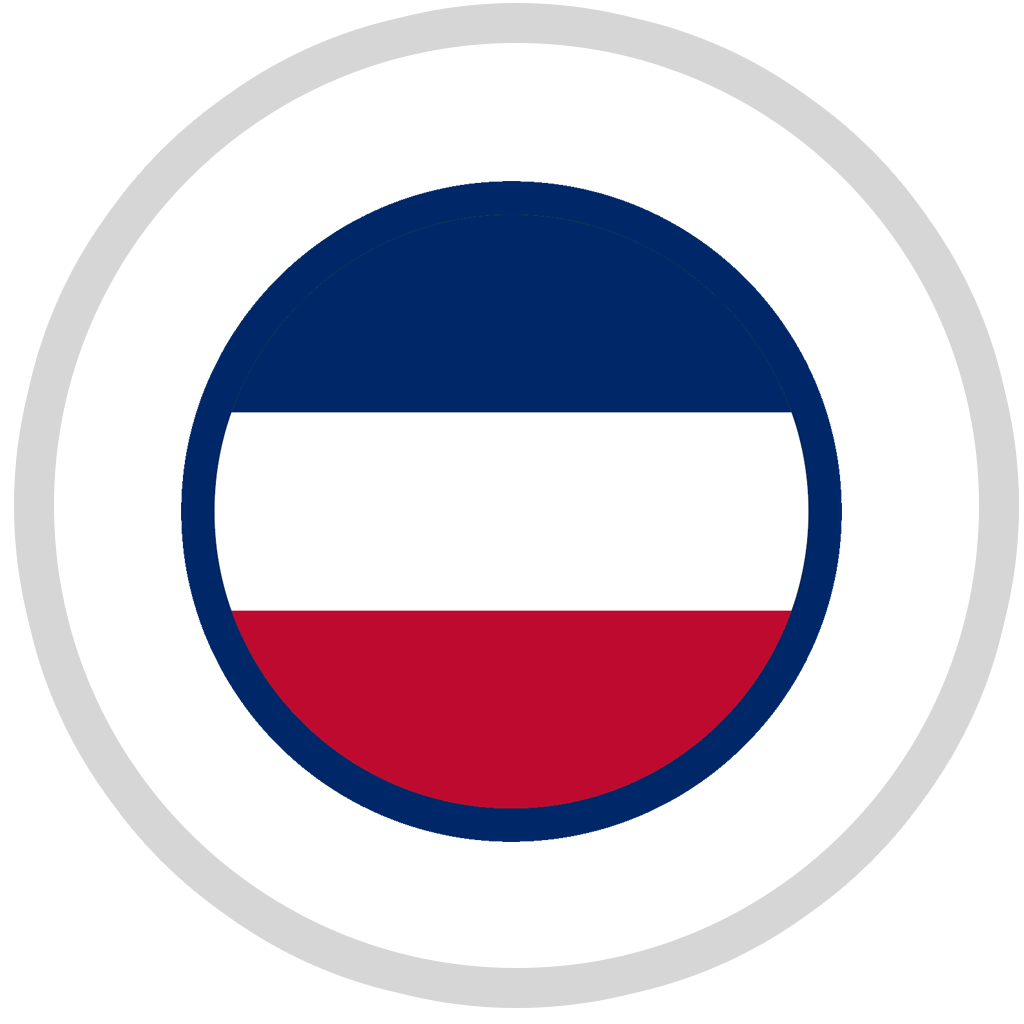
US Army General HQ

The War Department had authorized a General Headquarters, United States Army (GHQ) in 1921, but it was not activated until July 26, 1940. Its purpose was to facilitate mobilization by overseeing the organization and training of the Army's field forces on the American mainland (Zone of Interior). In October 1940, the command of the corps areas was separated from the four armies that had been established in 1932. On March 17, 1941, the United States was divided into four defense commands that would become operational areas in the event of an impending invasion. In addition to these training duties, GHQ was assigned command and planning for military operations in the Zone of Interior on July 3, 1941. GHQ was replaced by the Army Ground Forces on March 9, 1942. The four defense commands and all operational areas were transferred to the War Department General Staff.

=== General Staff ===
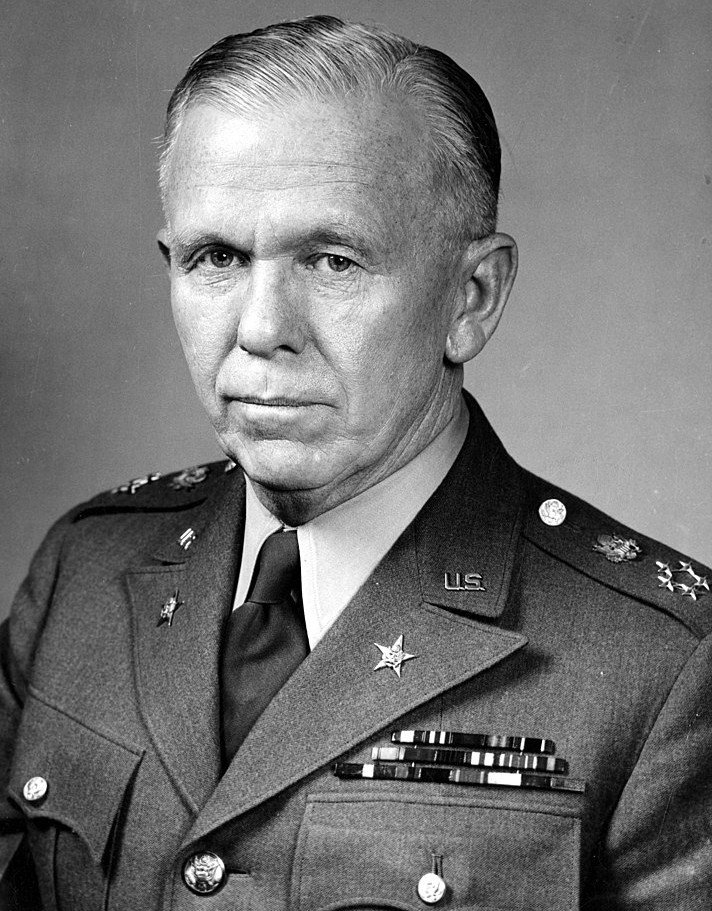
General of the Army George Catlett Marshall

The US Army General Staff was the centerpiece of strategic planning and coordination. It consisted of several departments:

- G-1 (Personnel): Responsible for personnel management, recruiting and troop strength.
- G-2 (Intelligence): Responsible for gathering and analyzing intelligence on the enemy.
- G-3 (Operations): Coordinated the planning and execution of military operations.
- G-4 (Logistics): Focused on supplying troops with supplies and equipment.

The head of the US Army was the Chief of the General Staff, a role filled by General George C. Marshall during World War II. There was also a special staff consisting of the Legislative and Liaison Division, the Inspector General, the Manpower Board, the Budget Division and the Civil Affairs Division.

=== Field army ===
A field army theoretically consisted of three corps, an anti-aircraft artillery brigade, engineers with three general regiments, six separate battalions, two heavy pontoon battalions and a battalion for topography, water supply and camouflage, three tank destroyer battalions, two signal battalions and a large number of companies and service units. A total of 11 armies were formed during the Second World War.

- First United States Army (October 1, 1933)
- Second United States Army (October 1, 1933)
- Third United States Army (October 1, 1933)
- Fourth United States Army (October 1, 1933)
- Fifth United States Army (January 5, 1943)
- Sixth United States Army (January 25, 1943)
- Seventh United States Army (July 10, 1943)
- Eighth United States Army (June 10, 1944)
- Ninth United States Army (April 15, 1944)
- Tenth United States Army (June 20, 1944)
- Fifteenth United States Army (August 21, 1944)

The First, Third, Fifth, Seventh, Ninth and Fifteenth Armies served in Europe, while the Sixth, Eighth and Tenth Armies were deployed in the Pacific. The Fifth and Seventh were deployed to North Africa, while the Second and Fourth remained in the United States and took on training duties.

=== Corps ===
The corps theoretically consisted of three infantry divisions, an anti-aircraft regiment, a mechanized cavalry regiment, two engineer regiments, a field artillery brigade, a tank destroyer group, a signal battalion and various service units. The size of corps staffs was drastically reduced by Army Ground Forces in 1943 as the corps concept evolved along flexible guidelines that allowed for individual combat battalions to be assigned or attached as needed. A corps became a variable combination of divisions and battalions, essentially consisting of a commander and a small staff directing combat operations and leading the non-divisional combat units under his command. These included elements such as the corps artillery, cavalry squadrons and tank destroyer battalions. They were distributed among the divisions, deployed for massive support or held in reserve. As the divisions had been streamlined, the corps became the headquarters for the deployment of combat elements in the right tactical combinations for the task at hand.

=== Division ===
Divisions were the largest units of the army with a prescribed structure and functioned as the smallest formation comprising units of different arms and services. They were designed for normal operational self-sufficiency, which varied depending on the type of division. Since it was assumed that the armored division would normally operate at a considerable distance from the mass of forces, as would the mechanized division at a somewhat lesser distance and the infantry division the least, maintenance, supply, and engineering support was distributed accordingly. All were kept to a minimum, as corps and armies were designed as pools of specialized units to provide needed support in unusual circumstances.

During the Second World War, a total of 92 divisions were deployed, 89 of which remained after the war. By May 1945, the five hardest hit divisions (3rd, 4th, 9th, 36th and 45th) had suffered a loss of 176%. To partially offset these losses, the divisions not yet deployed were ruthlessly plundered. This wiped out much of the careful preparation and training programs that had prepared the divisions, and many of them were deployed as hastily upgraded formations with minimal training. A typical infantry division consisted of 3 infantry regiments, a reconnaissance platoon, four artillery battalions, an engineer battalion, a medical battalion and six special units such as a signal company, military police and military band.

The initial armored division consisted of a tank brigade with three tank regiments, two with light tanks and one with medium tanks, as well as a field artillery regiment with two battalions. There was also an armored reconnaissance battalion and an attached air observation squadron for reconnaissance, while the support and service elements consisted of an armored infantry regiment, a field artillery battalion, an engineer battalion, a signal company, a maintenance company, a QM truck battalion and a medical battalion. With the second major reorganization, which came into effect on September 15, 1943, the light tank division was introduced. It reduced the tank strength by replacing the two regiments (i.e. six tank battalions) with three tank battalions.

The regimental level was abolished in all armored divisions with the exception of the 2nd and 3rd, which remained in the old structure. This should have meant a halving of the armored division (three instead of six battalions); in fact, the reduction amounted to about a third. An additional combat command was introduced to control the division reserves, which was designated CCR (or CCC). The reconnaissance battalion was replaced by a cavalry reconnaissance squadron, reducing the total strength of the division by almost 4,000 men. During the Second World War, the armored divisions underwent six separate reorganizations, two of which were actually significant. The first, which came into effect on March 1, 1942, resulted in heavy tank divisions.

The tank brigade was disbanded together with one of the tank regiments, so that two combat commands (CCA and CCB) and two tank regiments were created in its place. There were three tank battalions in each regiment, whereby the ratio of light to medium tanks was changed and each regiment now had two medium and one light battalion. The artillery was also reorganized into three separate battalions. The combat commands gave the division more flexibility, as their composition could be varied according to the division commander's assessment of the battle situation.

=== Regiment, company and platoon ===
The strength of the Standard Infantry Regiment changed several times during the course of the war. In June 1941, it was increased from 2,542 to 3,340 men and then reduced to 3,118 men by July 15, 1943, and to 3,068 men by January 24, 1945. An infantry regiment consisted of a staff company, three infantry battalions, an anti-tank company, a gun company and a support and supply company. An infantry battalion consisted of 871 men in four companies plus staff. The companies were 187 men strong and consisted of four platoons. A company was commanded by a captain, a platoon by a lieutenant or sergeant. At full strength, a platoon had 3 squads of 12 men.

== Recruitment ==
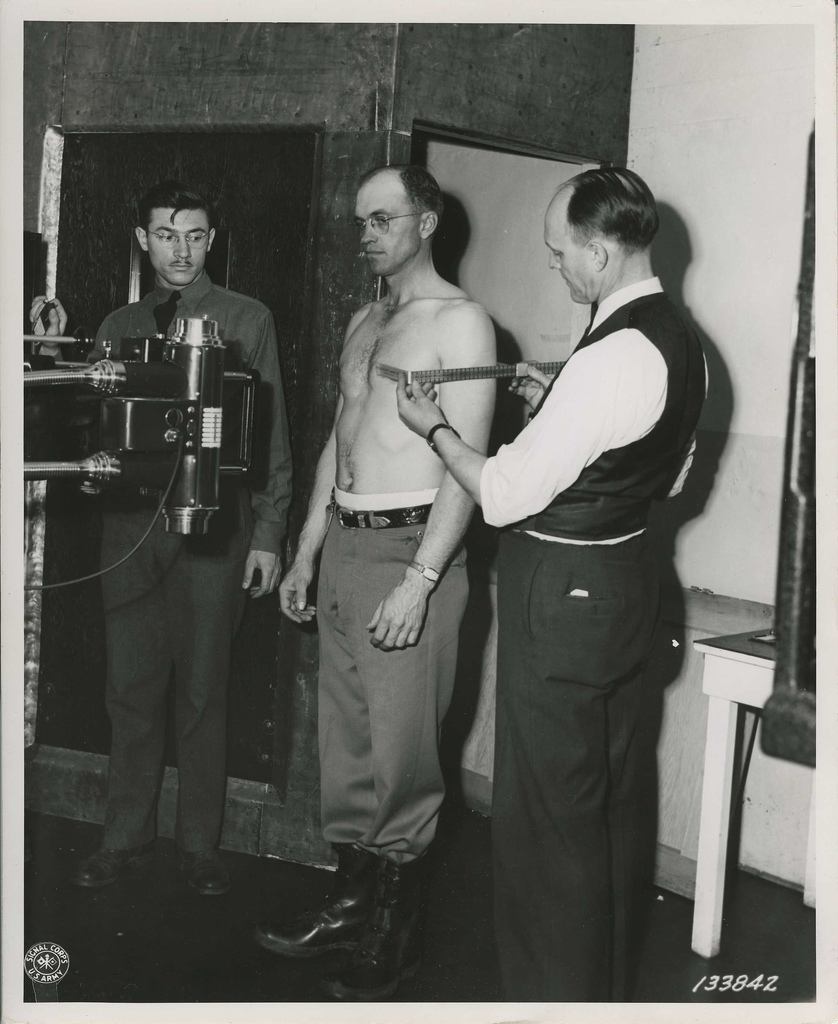
A draftee receiving a chest x-ray as a part of his physical examination at the reception center, Fort Douglas, Utah

At the start of the war in December 1941, the army had a strength of 1,686,000 soldiers divided into 29 infantry, 5 armored and 2 cavalry divisions. Of these divisions, only two were outside the continental United States, the remaining 34 lacked essential equipment and only 17 had received sufficient training to be considered combat ready. By 1945, the number of troops had grown to 7.7 million soldiers. The army consisted of the Regular Army, the National Guard and the Reserve. The Selective Training and Service Act of September 16, 1940, set the draft age at 21 to 45. Recruitment was carried out by the Selective Service. The Selective Service consisted of a national office and 53 branch offices spread across the individual states. In addition to an office for each of the 48 states, there was also an office in Hawaii, Alaska and Puerto Rico as well as one each for the city of New York and the District of Columbia.

At the local level, physicians appointed to 6,443 local boards were responsible for initially assessing the physical condition of registrants. In contrast to the process employed during World War I, the Selective Service System did not induct men into the service. The final decision regarding a man's qualifications for service was not made by the local board, except in cases where the man was rejected outright. The local board considered all aspects of civilian manpower requirements in order to determine whether a man was available for service. If the man was not deemed essential to the civilian effort, a physician examined him for physical defects. If he was not indisputably disqualified under current procedures, he was sent to the Armed Forces for further examination and induction. At Army induction stations, medical examining boards made the final determination of a registrant's physical qualifications. Advisory boards and appeal boards were also set up to assist selective service and Army officials as well as registrants. Examining boards were to be located in centers of population, preferably in or adjacent to a military post or station, while at the same time reducing the distance traveled by registrants from their homes to the examining board. It was determined that about half of these boards could he established at military installations. Locations for boards were suggested by The Surgeon General, but actual placement was to be left as a matter for decision by corps area commanders concerned.

The Army medical examining board was to consist of 11 medical officers and 1 dental officer, preferably reserves. The officer in charge was to have been on active duty for a sufficient period to enable him or her to supervise the preparation of the examining room and to check supplies and equipment. The responsibility for the supervision of all boards in a given military area was to be borne by a Regular Army medical officer. However, the scarcity of Regular Army medical officers rendered this impractical. In addition to the officer in charge, the board was to consist of one general surgeon, three internists, one orthopedist, two ophthalmologists, one otorhinolaryngologist, one neuropsychiatrist, one clinical pathologist, and one dentist.

In order to facilitate the work of the board, it was deemed essential to have the assistance of a total of 22 enlisted personnel or qualified civilians. This complement was to comprise two noncommissioned officers (preferably of the Medical Department), one stenographer, one typist, two laboratory technicians, eight individuals to serve as clerks, and eight individuals to serve as messengers and to perform general duties. During the medical examination, which included vision and hearing, weight, height, dental health and a check for hereditary diseases, the recruits were divided into three classes: 1-A fully physically qualified for general active military service., 1-B Physically unfit for general active military service, but fit for special and limited military service., 4 unfit.

== Living conditions ==
=== Accommodation and food supply ===
During World War II, the living conditions of U.S. soldiers varied greatly depending on where they were stationed, the phase of the war, and the branch of the military to which they belonged. Overall, conditions were difficult, but the U.S. Army was better equipped and organized than it had been in World War I, thanks to advancements in logistics, medical care, and technology. American soldiers were generally well-fed compared to other armies. They were issued various types of rations, including A and B-Rations (used behind the front lines), C-Rations (canned food for combat situations) and K-Rations (lighter, portable meals). A and B rations provided about 4,300 calories per day and C rations about 3,300 calories a day.

While the quality of food was often adequate, soldiers frequently grew tired of the repetitive meals. Soldiers in the European and Pacific theaters found it difficult to maintain regular meals during intense combat or in remote areas. While in World War I soldiers often faced food shortages in World War II the process of feeding soldiers in combat zones had improved, though problems of malnutrition and lack of fresh food persisted in some theaters.

=== Health and hygiene ===
Disease was a major issue in both theaters. In the Pacific, diseases like malaria, dysentery, and sandfly fever were common. In Europe, cold-related ailments like trench foot were prevalent, especially during winter campaigns like the Battle of the Bulge. Hygiene was often poor in the field, with soldiers going weeks without proper washing or clean clothes. Combat fatigue (now recognized as PTSD) became a significant issue during the war. The exposing to prolonged combat, led to several psychological effects. Soldiers often suffered from nightmares, heavy startle response, panic attacks or hysteria. There were also psychosomatic symptoms like: gastrointestinal complaints such as spasms and inflammation, cardiophobia or bedwetting. The U.S. Army began to take steps to address mental health during the war, though treatment options were still limited. Soldiers dealing with severe combat stress were sometimes rotated out of the front lines and given rest periods.

Americans troops in Merrill's Marauders relied on halizone tablets to purified water and often suffered from water borne intestinal diseases since they didn't boil water, unlike Chinese soldiers who drank only boiled water. Ogbum said "took time to boil all their drinking water, [while] ... far from boiling what they drank, many of the Marauders could not even be bothered to await the action of the halizone tablets in their canteens but would pop the tablets in their mouths like aspirin and wash them down with a pint of water dipped out of a trail side stream." and Hunter said "Only too late at Walawbum did we learn that the Chinese units were using the stream, from which we obtained our drinking water, as a latrine. Those men who, through force of circumstance or by choice, relied on halizone tablets to purify their drinking water soon became the victims of amoebic dysentery of the worst type."

=== Military justice ===
US military justice during World War II was governed under the Articles of War enacted by Congress on June 4, 1920. These Articles were in effect through World War II and up until the Uniform Code of Military Justice came into effect in 1951. By 1945, there were 12 million American soldiers in uniform making the administration of military justice a complex undertaking. Some 50,000 American soldiers deserted during World War II of which more than 21,000 soldiers were convicted of desertion. Of these, 49 were sentenced to death but only one was executed (Private Eddie Slovik). The death penalty was applied more frequently for other offences, in particular for the crimes of murder and rape. It was also utilized in cases where enemy soldiers or civilians were convicted of violating the laws of war.

== Training ==
=== Enlisted men ===
At the beginning of 1940, the only military training facilities in the USA were the General and Special Service Schools, small institutions with the task of training a limited number of individuals. The much larger task of basic training for all new recruits was left to the units. It was clear that this system was unacceptable in view of the huge influx of 'citizen soldiers' that the draft would generate. In 1940, the War Department therefore adopted a new plan and special training facilities, known as Replacement Training Centers (RTCs), were set up throughout the country. The purpose of these RTCs was to provide tactical units with a steady stream of trained men to relieve these units of their training burden during mobilization and combat.

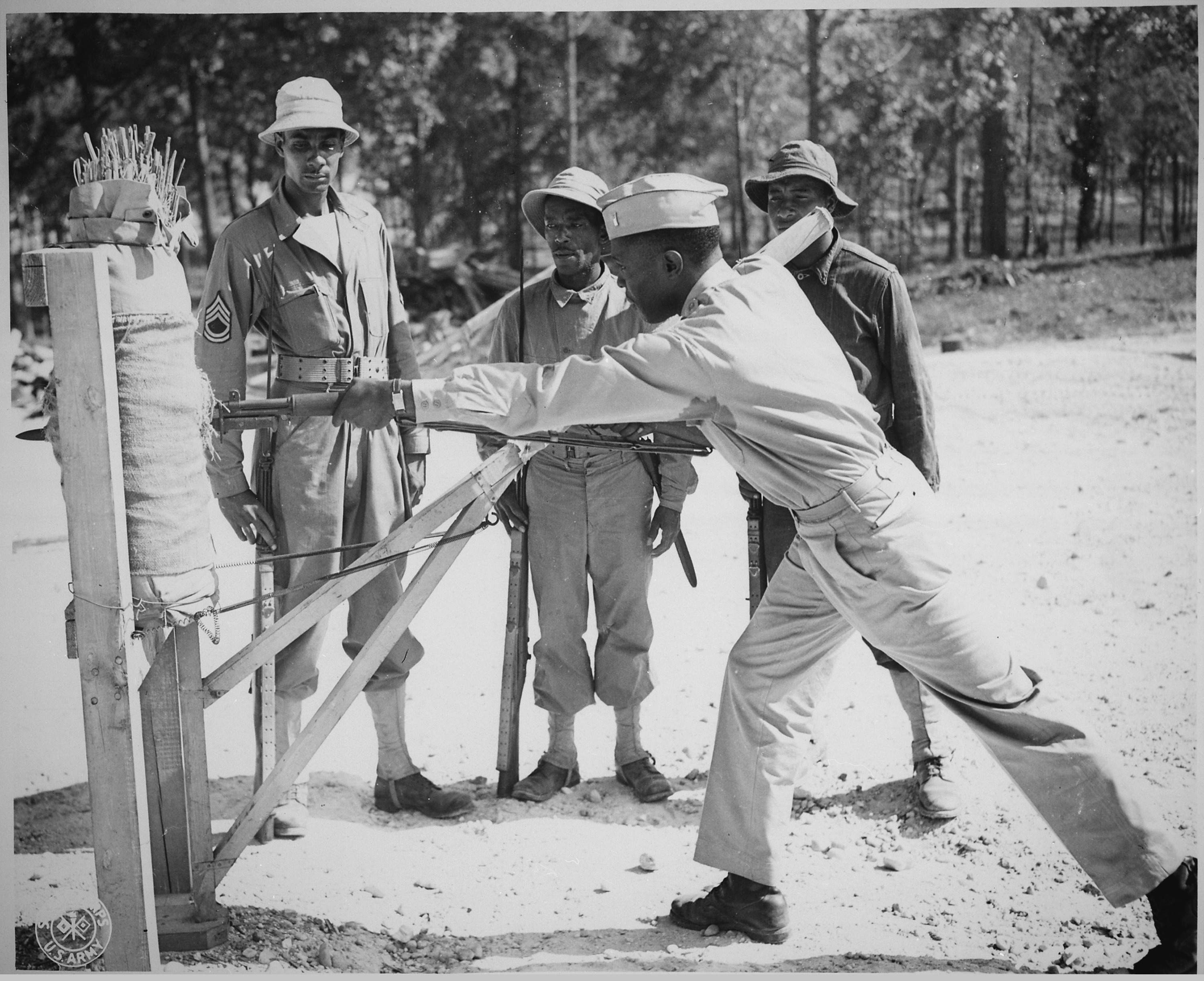
African-American soldiers during bayonet practice

Twelve centers for ground troops began their work in March 1941: three for the coastal artillery, one for the tank troops, one for the cavalry, three for the field artillery and four for the infantry. In the course of 1941, they trained over 200,000 men. Further RTCs were set up for the new branches of the armed forces, such as air defense and tank destroyers. They trained the newly recruited men in the basic military subjects and in the elementary special techniques of their respective branch of arms or service. The former included subjects such as military discipline, personal hygiene, first aid, guard duty and the care and use of personal weapons. Originally, the courses lasted 12 to 13 weeks, but immediately after the attack on Pearl Harbor, many RTC programs were shortened to 8 weeks. This did not last long, however, and by the fall of 1943 all courses, with a few exceptions, had been set to last 17 weeks.

Since Ground combat in World War II required complex skills, the Army General Classification Test were developed. Its purpose was to assess the cognitive abilities of military recruits. There were:

- Classification tests designed to classify all soldiers in terms of their ability to learn their duties in the Army. On the whole, they measured the general level of a man's abilities rather than his abilities in a specific field. In many cases, the tests were also useful in screening out particular men. Those who were slow learners, for example, may be poor risks for specialized training regardless of their special aptitudes.
- Aptitude tests designed to classify soldiers in terms of their ability to learn certain Army jobs. The most widely used were the general aptitude tests, that was, tests which measured ability for a general field, such as mechanical or clerical work. Specific aptitude tests, not so widely used, were intended to measure aptitude for a particular task.
- Educational achievement tests to assess the educational status of a man. Educational achievement tests were given when a background in a particular academic subject was important in a job or for training.
- Trade knowledge tests to measure information about a particular job just as educational achievement tests measure knowledge of an academic subject. They may have been used to check experience as far as indicated by information about the job.

=== Officers ===
Officer Candidates were trained and selected for appointment in a section of the armed forces schools known as Officer Candidate Schools (OCS). These Officer Candidate Schools were established in July 1941 and replaced the officer training camps of the First World War, but with the special feature that candidates were restricted to warrant officers and recruits who had served for at least four to six months at the time of admission. The basic aim was to create a meritocratic and democratic system of recruitment rather than the rather arbitrary selection of young officers from a social and intellectual elite. The task of the OCS was to train soldiers of the respective branch of the armed forces as combat officers in order to cover mobilization needs that could not be met by officers of the regular armed forces, the reserve or the National Guard.

In courses lasting between 12 and 17 weeks, the schools trained the candidates in the basic duties of an officer candidate of the respective branch of the armed forces or service and decided whether or not they were suitable for an officer's commission. In 1942, they also took over the training of members of the Reserve Officers' Training Corps (ROTC) who had left college to join the Army before completing their ROTC course. This group made up about one-tenth of all OCS graduates and received a reserve officer's commission upon graduation. In 1940, the Army had only 14,000 career officers; by the end of 1943, there were 300,000. There were constant efforts, particularly by the Army Service Forces, to extend the length of the course to six months, but this was rejected.

=== Pay ===
Pay displayed is monthly

Flag officer
Rank	Time of Service														
	less than 3 years	over 3 years	over 5 years	over 6 years	over 9 years	over 10 years	over 12 years	over 15 years	over 17 years	over 18 years	over 21 years	over 23 years	over 24 years	over 27 years	over 30 years
General of the Army	1,125 $	″″	″″	″″	″″	″″	″″	″″	″″	″″	″″	″″	″″	″″	″″
General	$666	″″	″″	″″	″″	″″	″″	″″	″″	″″	″″	″″	″″	″″	″″
Lieutenant-General	$666	″″	″″	″″	″″	″″	″″	″″	″″	″″	″″	″″	″″	″″	″″
Major-General	$666	″″	″″	″″	″″	″″	″″	″″	″″	″″	″″	″″	″″	″″	″″
Brigadier general	$500	″″	″″	″″	″″	″″	″″	″″	″″	″″	″″	″″	″″	″″	″″

Senior officer
Rank	Time of Service														
	less than 3 years	over 3 years	over 5 years	over 6 years	over 9 years	over 10 years	over 12 years	over 15 years	over 17 years	over 18 years	over 21 years	over 23 years	over 24 years	over 27 years	over 30 years
Colonel	$333	$350	″″	$366	$383	″″	$400	$416	″″	$433	$450	″″	$466	$483	$500
Lieutenant Colonel less than 30 years service	$291	$306	″″	$320	$335	″″	$350	$364	″″	$379	$393	″″	$408	$422	
Lieutenant-Colonel more than 30 years service	$333	$350	″″	$366	$383	″″	$400	$416	″″	$433	$450	″″	$466	$483	$500
Major less than 23 years service	$250	$262	″″	$275	$287	″″	$300	$312	″″	$325	$337				
Major more than 23 years service	″″	″″	″″	″″	″″	″″	″″	″″	″″	″″	″″	$393	$408	$422	$437

Junior officer
Rank	Time of Service														
	less than 3 years	over 3 years	over 5 years	over 6 years	over 9 years	over 10 years	over 12 years	over 15 years	over 17 years	over 18 years	over 21 years	over 23 years	over 24 years	over 27 years	over 30 years
Captain less than 17 years service	$200	$210	″″	$220	$230	″″	$240	$250							
Captain more than 17 years service	″″	″″	″″	″″	″″	″″	″″	″″	$312	$325	$337	″″	$350	$362	$375
First Lieutenant less than 10 years service	$166	$175	″″	$183	$191										
First Lieutenant more than 10 years service	″″	″″	″″	″″	″″	$230	$240	$250	″″	$260	$270	″″	$280	$290	$300
Second Lieutenant less than 5 years service	$150	$157													
Second Lieutenant more than 5 years service	″″	″″	$175	$183	$191	″″	$200	$208	″″	$216	$225	″″	$233	$241	$250

Non-commissioned officers
Rank	Time of Service														
	less than 3 years	over 3 years	over 5 years	over 6 years	over 9 years	over 10 years	over 12 years	over 15 years	over 17 years	over 18 years	over 21 years	over 23 years	over 24 years	over 27 years	over 30 years
Warrant officer	$150	$157	″″	$165	$172	″″	$180	$187	″″	$195	$202	″″	$210	$217	$225
Chief Warrant officer	$175	$183	″″	$192	$201	″″	$210	$218	″″	$227	$236	″″	$245	$253	$262

Enlisted rank
Rank	Time of Service														
	less than 3 years	over 3 years	over 5 years	over 6 years	over 9 years	over 10 years	over 12 years	over 15 years	over 17 years	over 18 years	over 21 years	over 23 years	over 24 years	over 27 years	over 30 years
Corporal	$66	$69	″″	$72	$75	″″	$79	$82	″″	$85	$89	″″	$92	$95	$99
Private First Class	$54	$56	″″	$59	$62	″″	$64	$67	″″	$70	$72	″″	$75	$78	$81
Private	$50	$52	″″	$55	$57	″″	$60	$62	″″	$65	$67	″″	$70	$72	$75

=== Promotion ===
With the exception of recommendations for the promotion of officers to the grades of colonel and lieutenant colonel from units subordinate to the Commander in Chief, Army Ground Forces, all recommendations were made directly to the Adjutant General, (the principal administrative officer of the US Army). The sole criterion for promotion was demonstrated aptitude and ability for the duties and responsibilities of the next higher grade. Except in units engaged in combat operations in an active theater of operations, no officer was normally promoted more than one grade at a time, and no officer once promoted was promoted again until he had served at least six months in the rank to which he was last promoted. As a general rule, no officer, except a second lieutenant, was recommended for promotion until he had demonstrated by at least six months' distinguished service his fitness for promotion to the next higher grade and his ability to perform the duties involved. If an officer who was not a second lieutenant had, in the opinion of a general who had personal knowledge of the circumstances, clearly demonstrated his fitness for promotion in a shorter period, the War Department considered waiving this requirement, provided the recommendation clearly set forth the circumstances which prompted the recommendation and justified the promotion.

=== Medic ===
==== Training ====
Medics underwent basic military training alongside regular infantry soldiers to prepare them for the battlefield environment. This training included physical fitness, weapons handling (though most medics did not carry weapons), and military tactics. After basic training, medics received specialized medical training. This included instruction on:

- First aid (bandaging, splinting, stopping bleeding).
- Treating shock.
- Administering morphine for pain relief.
- Applying tourniquets.
- Treating burns, fractures, and other common battlefield injuries.
- Basic sanitation and disease prevention.

The training for medics was typically shorter than that of doctors and nurses but highly focused on the practical application of life-saving techniques in high-pressure, combat environments. Many Army medics attended the Medical Field Service School at Carlisle Barracks, Pennsylvania, where they learned about battlefield evacuation, triage, and other advanced medical techniques. This training emphasized rapid decision-making and the ability to work under extreme stress.

==== Medic equipment ====
A World War II U.S. Army medic was equipped with a variety of medical tools and supplies to provide immediate care on the battlefield. These supplies were carried in a distinctive medic bag or kit. The following items were typically part of a medic's standard loadout:

- First Aid Kits: These contained bandages, gauze, adhesive tape, antiseptics, and scissors.
- Morphine Syrettes: Small, pre-loaded syringes of morphine were used to provide pain relief for severely injured soldiers.
- Tourniquets: Medics carried these to stop severe bleeding from limb injuries.
- Sulfa Powder: This was an antibacterial agent used to prevent infection in wounds. Soldiers were also issued individual packets of sulfa powder.
- Bandages and Splints: Medics had access to a variety of bandages and splints to stabilize fractures and protect wounds.
- Water Purification Tablets: Medics also carried these to ensure clean drinking water in the field.
- Litter (Stretcher): When treating soldiers, medics often had to carry a litter to evacuate the wounded from the battlefield.
- Medical Tags: Medics used metal medical tags (field medical cards) to record a soldier's injuries and treatments administered before evacuation.
- Medics were clearly marked with a Red Cross insignia on their helmets and armbands, though this protection was not always respected by enemy forces.

==== Treatment of injured soldiers ====
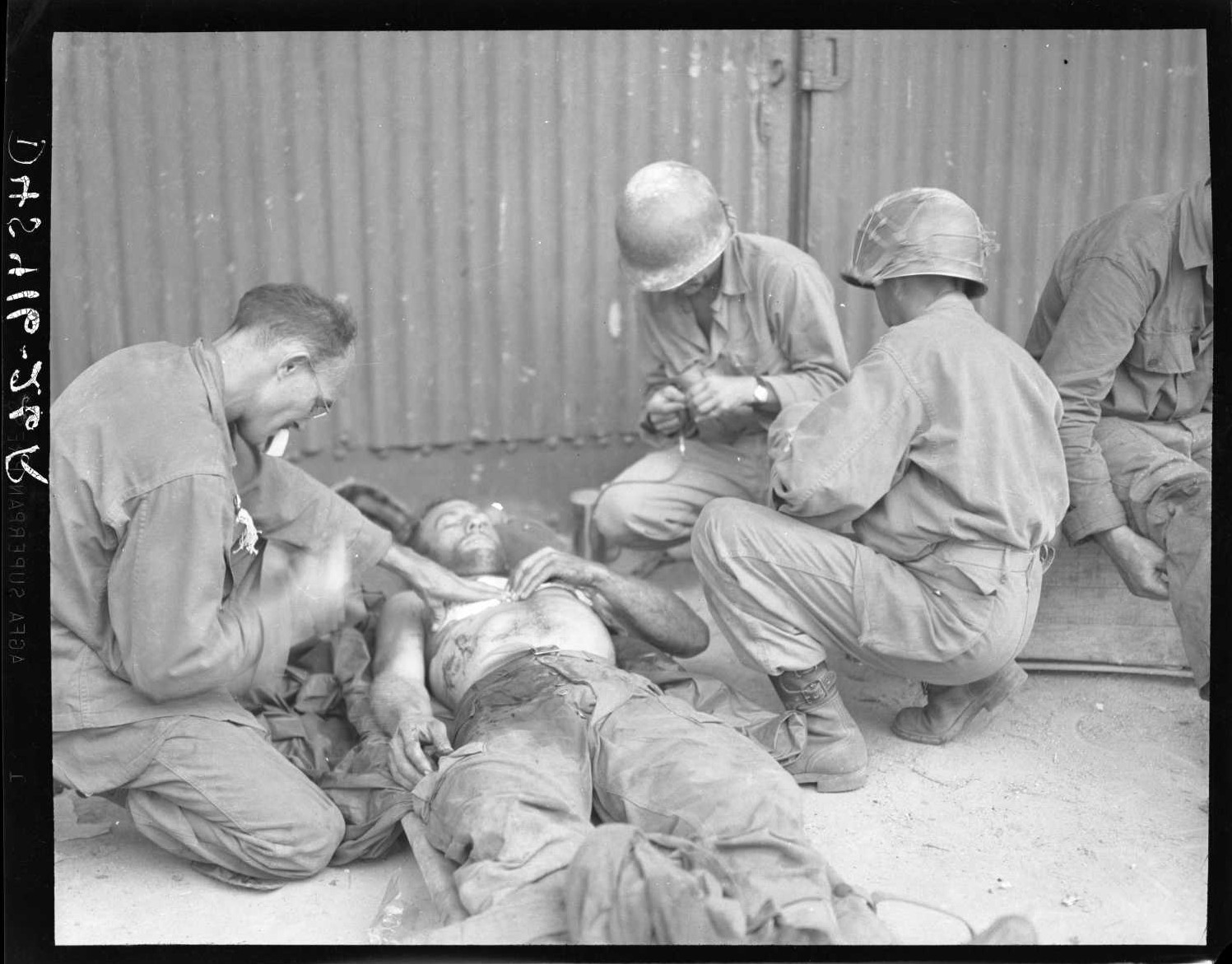
Patient arrives at rear section of 2nd Battalion Aid Station, 129 Infantry, from forward section. He will be given as much emergency treatment as is necessary prior to travelling to the Collection Station. Manila, Philippine Islands.

The treatment of wounded soldiers in World War II followed a structured system, starting from immediate care on the battlefield and continuing through various levels of medical facilities: The first stage of care occurred directly on the battlefield. Medics would rush to the injured, often under fire, to provide immediate care. This typically involved stopping bleeding, administering morphine, and stabilizing the patient for transport. After receiving initial treatment, soldiers were evacuated to battalion or regimental aid stations located just behind the front lines. At these aid stations, medical officers would perform triage—prioritizing soldiers based on the severity of their injuries—and provide more advanced care, such as blood transfusions or emergency surgery. From the aid stations, seriously wounded soldiers were evacuated to larger medical facilities, such as field hospitals or evacuation hospitals. These hospitals were often located several miles behind the front lines and offered more extensive surgical and medical treatment. Soldiers with severe injuries that could not be treated adequately in the field were evacuated from the combat theater to general hospitals, which were often located in the U.K. or the United States. These hospitals provided long-term care, rehabilitation, and recovery services.

Wounded soldiers were transported by various means, including jeeps, trucks, ambulances, and, in some cases, airplanes. The use of air evacuation was a significant advancement in WWII, allowing soldiers to be transported to hospitals much faster than in previous wars. One of the most critical advances during WWII was the widespread use of penicillin to treat infections. This antibiotic significantly reduced the number of deaths from infected wounds.

== Departments ==
=== Women's Army Corps ===
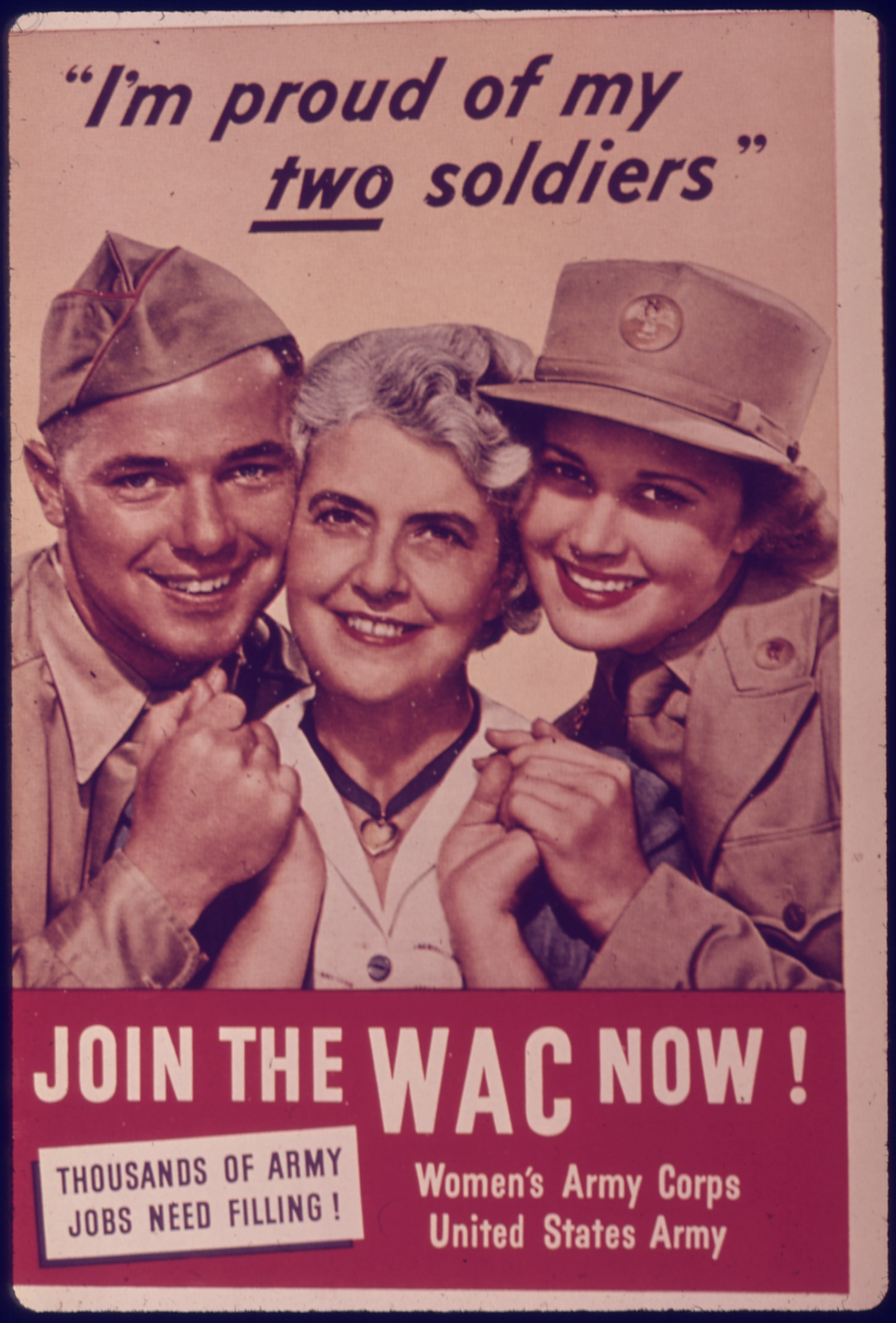
Recruiting poster of the WAC

The Women's Army Corps (WAC) was originally founded as the Women's Army Auxiliary Corps (WAAC) on May 15, 1942. Its formation was initiated by Congresswoman Edith Nourse Rogers, who introduced a bill to officially integrate women into military service. The aim was to employ women in non-combat roles in order to free up men for frontline service. The introduction of the WAAC faced various challenges. Firstly, social prejudice against women in the military was widespread and there was skepticism about their capabilities and potential. In addition, the initial legal structure of the WAAC was problematic, as women did not have the same status as male soldiers and therefore did not receive the same rights and benefits. This changed in July 1943 when the WAAC was transformed into the Women's Army Corps, giving women full military status. Like the men, the women also had to undergo a medical examination to determine their fitness. Applicants had to be between 21 and 45 years old, could not have a family, had to be at least 4.98 ft tall and weigh at least 99.20 lbs. The standard training at the WAC lasted around four to six weeks. This basic training included military discipline, physical fitness and specific training depending on the planned role. Depending on the specialization, training could take longer if additional technical or specialized skills were required.

=== Army Ground Forces ===
The Army Ground Forces (AGF) were composed of infantry, cavalry, armor and artillery. Less than half of the Army Ground Forces tactical troops were actually assigned to divisions; they were instead in non-divisional combat and service units. The ratio on March 31, 1945, for example, was about 15:12 (1,468,941 million to 1,194,398 million). In addition, there were a further 1,204,976 million in ASF-related units in the communications zone ("Com Z"). In 1943, all these units were listed as GHQ Reserve. These reserve units were grouped into battalions. Corps and armies were then equipped with these battalions as required, with the brigade and regiment levels being dropped.

==== Infantry ====
The Second World War led to the largest buildup of the US infantry to date. Between 1941 and 1943, there was a 60 percent increase, so that 317 infantry regiments of various types were mobilized by the end of the war. These included previously unknown infantry types such as the three mountain, 12 glider and 16 paratrooper regiments. In addition, there were 99 different battalions, some of which were entrusted with highly specialized tasks. The army's ordnance rifle was the M1 Garand, introduced in 1936. However, overseas support units were still equipped with the Springfield M1903 until 1944. Even when armed with the M1, units carried an M1903 with an M1 grenade launcher until late 1943, when the M7 grenade launcher became available for the M1. The standard sidearm was the Colt M1911. Additionally, there was the Smith & Wesson Model 10 revolver and the M1917 revolver. Starting in 1943, a carbine version of the M1 was issued to supplement or replace the Smith & Wesson Model 10 revolver, intended for officers and second-line troops such as drivers, gunners, MPs, etc.

==== Artillery ====
The artillery was divided between the field artillery and the coastal artillery corps. The field artillery was responsible for the artillery that accompanied the army into the field, while the coastal artillery defended the land against air and sea attacks. The field artillery, which included light, mountain, medium and heavy guns, had the task of supporting the advancing combat troops with fire at close Ranke and continuously. In addition, it supported the troops in depth with barrage fire, fire on enemy reserves, fire to restrict movement in the rear and to disrupt command structures. Before 1943, each army corps was supported by an independent field artillery brigade consisting of a 155-mm gun and two 155-mm howitzer regiments as well as an observation battalion.

A field artillery brigade, consisting of a 155-mm howitzer regiment and two 75-mm howitzer regiments, was incorporated into each square division, but in the course of the tripartition of these divisions, their brigades were disbanded. During 1943, the Army introduced the battalion/group system, which abolished the old fixed brigade and replaced it with a flexible brigade structure. The army had a wide Ranke of field artillery battalions, each with a specific weapon and means of transportation. They were divided into light artillery (75-mm to 105-mm), medium artillery (115-mm to 155-mm) and heavy artillery (155-mm to 240-mm). Due to the critical supply of ammunition in Europe, the field artillery even converted some battalions and batteries to various German and French cannons in order to benefit from the captured ammunition stocks.

==== Armored Corps ====
The Armored Corps was established in July 1940, influenced by the success of the German blitzkrieg tactics. Within a week, the I Armored Corps was formed, consisting of the 1st and 2nd Armored Divisions, both activated on July 15. Additionally, the "Armored Force" included the 70th Tank Battalion as a separate unit outside the division. As the Army expanded, so did the armored divisions and armored corps. The II Armored Corps was established in February 1942, the III in August 1942, and the IV in September 1942. This aligned with the doctrine at the time, which stated that armored divisions should be deployed in specialized corps made up of two armored and one motorized division. However, in February 1944, all armored units were reassigned to corps and armies, and the armored corps were converted into regular corps.

==== Cavalry ====
At the beginning of the fighting in Europe, the cavalry of the US Army was already partially mechanized. The 1st and 13th Cavalry Regiments were already fully equipped and combined as the 7th Cavalry Brigade as part of the armored forces. The 4th and 6th Cavalry Regiments were partially mechanized, i.e. their horses were transported in large wagons that could keep up with the other motor vehicles, unload quickly and be deployed on horseback. Ten purely horse-based regiments remained in the Regular Army, eight of which were combined into two cavalry divisions by the end of 1941. With the abolition of the Chief of Cavalry Office in March 1942, the Army Ground Forces accelerated the completion of mechanization. The 2nd, 3rd, 11th and 14th Cavalry Regiments were disbanded in 1942 and reactivated in 1943 as numerically equal fully mechanized cavalry. The four cavalry divisions and seventeen cavalry regiments of the National Guard were disbanded in 1940, leaving only seven partially mechanized regiments and one brigade from two Texas cavalry regiments. The latter two regiments were used as foot infantry, while the others were fully mechanized.

=== Army Air Forces ===
The Army Air Forces (AAF) was the successor to the Army Air Corps and predecessor of today's US Air Force. The AAF was founded in June 1941 as an independent division within the Army. In 1941, there were four American air fleets stationed on the American mainland. Two other units, the Philippine Department Air Force and the Hawaiian Department Air Force, were stationed in the Pacific, while the Panama Department Air Force was located in the Caribbean. An equally small Alaskan Air Force guarded Alaska and the Aleutian Islands. The basic continental defense focused on the Tactical Air Forces, of which there were four at the outbreak of World War II: the 1st AF (Mitchel Field, Long Island, New York), the 2nd AF (HQ Geiger Field, Spokane, Washington State), the 3rd AF (HQ MacDill Field, Tampa, Florida), and the 4th AF (HQ March Field, Riverside, California). All were established in the winter of 1940 to 1941 as Air Districts under the old GHQAF.

They were organized as air combat units, each assigned a specific area of the United States in which to operate: 1st AF, East Coast; 2nd AF, Northwest and Mountains; 3rd AF, Southeast; and 4th AF, along the West Coast and in the Southwest. Their original mission was to provide units and aircraft for the defense of the continental United States and to participate in combat exercises and maneuvers with the Army Ground Forces. Later, they mainly organized and trained bomber, fighter and other units and crews for overseas operations. The Chief of the Air Staff was a member of the Combined Chiefs of Staff and the Joint Chiefs of Staff, who set the strategic objectives and plans of the Allied forces. The Air Staff was the instrument of the Commanding General, enabling him to direct and control all parts of the AAF worldwide. The AAF high command also included the Deputy Commander and Chief of Air Staff, the Air Staff, which consisted of four Deputy Chiefs, six Assistant Chiefs of Air Staff (each responsible for plans, operations, commitments and requirements, personnel, intelligence, training and materiel, maintenance and distribution), and several specialist officers, each of whom was a specialist in a particular field.

=== Army Service Forces ===
The Army Service Forces (ASF) consisted of the Corps of Engineers, the Signal Corps, the Ordnance Department, the Quartermaster Corps, the Chemical Warfare Service and the Medical Department. The primary duties of the Army Service Forces included logistics and supply, organizing and managing the resupply of food, fuel, ammunition and other materials to ensure a continuous flow of resources to the front lines. The ASF were also responsible for transportation, coordinating the movement of troops and equipment by land, sea and air. Another important area was the maintenance and repair of vehicles, weapons and equipment. The ASF set up workshops and depots in the war zones to ensure the operational readiness of the army. In addition, they were responsible for the construction of military facilities, roads and airfields, which also included the development of infrastructure in liberated areas. Medical care was also a central task of the ASF. They organized the medical service and the evacuation of the wounded as well as the administration of field hospitals and clinics. Finally, they took over the administration and personnel management, including the recruitment and training of soldiers for logistical tasks.

== Racism ==
The Selective Service Act of 1940 also allowed the induction of a number of African Americans equal to their percentage of the national population, which translated into 10.6 per cent. However, since the majority of African Americans were generally ranked in the lowest two intelligence classes there were strong resistance inducting that predetermined percentage. The Army argued that if 10.6 per cent of all draftees were black, it would have to organize ten of its combat units completely with colored Americans.

Although the black soldiers were exposed to racial resentment as soon as they were called up, they were more upset about the government's inability to protect them and use them in combat than about the problem of racial segregation. Indeed, the majority of black soldiers seemed to have accepted the reality of a segregated military. A 1943 survey of black troops conducted by the War Department revealed that only 20% of respondents considered the Army to be unfair. This resignation did not, however, translate into acquiescence to the status quo. The same War Department survey inquired of black soldiers which subject they would raise with President Roosevelt if they were to be afforded an audience. Half of the respondents indicated that they would discuss racial discrimination. The survey demonstrates that the Second World War represented a pivotal moment in the lives of these black GIs. They anticipated greater outcomes, voiced their opinions, and resisted oppression. For instance, when black soldiers were asked whether they believed they would enjoy enhanced rights and privileges following the war, 43 percent responded in the affirmative.

Although the number of black soldiers in the Army peaked at some 700,000, segregation limited the positions they could hold. For example, at the end of 1943 only 20 percent of black soldiers actually served in combat units. In spite of the contributions of black service units, military officials had generally refused to send black troops into combat during the first two years of World War II. Yet until January 1944, no high-ranking military official had exposed the racial stereotypes that were keeping black soldiers out of combat. Then Secretary of War Henry Stimson ignited a controversy with his response to a letter from Representative Hamilton Fish, a congressman from New York. Fish, a white man who had commanded black troops in World War I, wanted to know why the Army had failed to send black troops into battle during the current war.

In reply, Stimson explained that the low educational scores of black conscripts meant black units “have been unable to master efficiently the techniques of modern weapons.” Representative Fish had Stimson's letter read into the Congressional Record, and a firestorm of controversy erupted. Black newspapers used headlines such as “Too Dumb to Fight” to explain Stimson's letter to their readers. Black Congressman William Dawson wrote a letter of protest to Undersecretary of War John McCloy that made his thoughts on the matter abundantly clear. “The letter of the Secretary of War,” Dawson wrote, “is widely regarded as a direct insult to every Negro in the country and a gratuitous slap in the face of many thousand Negro soldiers in the Army.” As a veteran of World War I, Dawson was familiar with racism in the army. He wrote that Stimson's letter “represents the attitude with which I . . . am all too familiar.” Together with Truman Gibson the Civilian Aide to the Secretary of War, who had the ear of Stimson they were able to send black troops into combat by spring 1944. Even though there were some reforms during the war to prevent an escalation of conflicts and to give black soldiers a legal basis for voicing their complaints about discrimination, racial segregation was only abolished in 1948 by Executive Order 9981.

== See also ==
- Military history of the United States during World War II
