= Sandfly fever =

Sandfly fever can refer to:

- Visceral leishmaniasis, or kala-azar
- Pappataci fever, or Papatasi fever, an acute febrile arboviral infection (most commonly referred to if not otherwise specified)
