= Punta Toro virus =

Virus classification
- (unranked): Virus
- Realm: Riboviria
- Kingdom: Orthornavirae
- Phylum: Negarnaviricota
- Class: Bunyaviricetes
- Order: Hareavirales
- Family: Phenuiviridae
- Genus: Phlebovirus
- Species: Phlebovirus toroense

Strains
- PTV-A; PTV-B

Synonyms
- Punta Toro phlebovirus

Species of virus

Punta Toro virus is a member of the genus Phlebovirus of the family Phenuiviridae. It was initially isolated from patients in Colombia and two key patients in Panama. Two individual serotypes of PTV were isolated from these patients, PTV-Adames (A) and PTV-Balliet (B), with PTV-A appearing to be more virulent. PTV is considered to be relatively contained to the Americas with no cases being reported outside of this region. Along with a few other human pathogenic phleboviruses, PTV is considered to be a significant virus in terms of public health as little information is known about its clinical effects and with further research underway, PTV could have unforeseen impacts on health and virology.

== Structure ==
PTV possesses many structural characteristics typical of viruses in Phlebovirus. PTV has a helical nucleocapsid as well as an outer envelope. On the viral envelope PTV has two major glycoproteins, Gn and Gc, that function in host-cell binding and entry. Within the genus Phlebovirus, these glycoproteins form a characteristic icosahedral lattice with a triangulation number of T=12. Due to this structure, PTV appears as a relatively spherical particle when viewed in an electron micrograph with a diameter from 80 to 120 nm.

== Genome ==
The genome structure of PTV is negative sense, linear segmented RNA genome. The genome consists of three individual segments or varying length: S (1.7kb), M (3.2kb), and L (6.4kb) that encode for a total of six viral proteins. In terms of gene expression, PTV operates by using a strong hairpin sequence on the terminal end of each segment, coupled with the use of ambisense for the S segment and leaky scanning for the M segment. The process of transcription takes place in the host cell cytoplasm with the use of an RNA-dependent RNA polymerase, and enters replication after enough nucleoprotein has built up to form new intact virus particles.

== Clinical ==
PTV is a member of the phlebotomus fever subgroup of phleboviruses, and as the name suggests, causes an acute febrile illness. Acute febrile illness in humans is characterized by a rapid onset of fever that is often accompanied by secondary symptoms such as a headache, chills, myalgias and arthralgias. This illness will last for about 2–5 days and is not considered to be highly virulent in humans, however, testing in Syrian hamsters has revealed high virulence for the PTV-A serotype and a low virulence for the PTV-B serotype. Although relatively low numbers of human infection with this virus have been reported, the virus is of public health interest and further research will need to be conducted.
