= Alenquer virus =

Virus classification
- (unranked): Virus
- Realm: Riboviria
- Kingdom: Orthornavirae
- Phylum: Negarnaviricota
- Class: Bunyaviricetes
- Order: Hareavirales
- Family: Phenuiviridae
- Genus: Phlebovirus
- Species: Phlebovirus alenquerense

Synonyms
- Alenquer phlebovirus

Species of virus

Alenquer virus (ALEV) is a virus in the genus Phlebovirus. Alenquer virus was one of eight arthropod-borne viruses first isolated in the early 1980s from sites along roads built into the Amazon rainforest in Brazil for settlers. Sporadic cases of febrile illness have occurred in humans who live in jungle areas in Brazil and Panama.
