= Lone star virus =

Virus classification
- (unranked): Virus
- Realm: Riboviria
- Kingdom: Orthornavirae
- Phylum: Negarnaviricota
- Class: Bunyaviricetes
- Order: Hareavirales
- Family: Phenuiviridae
- Genus: Bandavirus
- Species: Bandavirus amblyommae

Synonyms
- Lone star bandavirus; Lone star virus

Species of virus

Lone star virus is a highly divergent bunyavirus, which is carried and transmitted by the lone star tick, Amblyomma americanum. This is the same vector that transmits the SFTS virus, and the newly discovered Bhanja and Heartland viruses.

Lone star virus shares the same vector as these viruses and has many characteristics of them, it shares less than sixty-one percent of its amino acid identity with them. Though the virus has never been a cause of illness in humans, it has the ability to infect both human and monkey cells, and its effects are seen, in both cell lines, 72 hours after contact.

It was first discovered and studied by the Center for Zoonoses Research, at the University of Illinois, in 1966. The virus was taken from a lone star tick, which had been removed from a woodchuck in the Land Between the Lakes region of Western Kentucky.

== Characteristics ==
Lone star virus's genome consist of negative, single-stranded RNA. It is in the Phenuiviridae family of viruses. Its genus is Bandavirus and its species name is Bandavirus amblyommae. It has been proven to produce titers in human and monkey cells seventy-two hours after inoculation. Although it was discovered in 1967, it has never been genetically characterized.

Interest has recently increased in it due to the emergence of STARI, or Southern Tick-borne Rash Illness, an unknown disease which is also associated with Amblyomma americanum. It is the hope of the scientific community that researching Lone star virus can give clues to the etiology of STARI. They are also curious as to whether LSV virus could be found in patients who have STARI. Finding a link between the two will help them to understand both of these viruses on a greater level.

The viruses size is between 90 and 100 micrometers.

== Transmission ==
There has not been any documented case of Lone star virus causing illness in a human. It is found to be present in the Lone star tick. This tick used to exist mainly in the South-Central United States, however it has increased in both range and abundance over the past twenty years, to now exist along most of the Southern states and the Eastern Coast of the United States. This increase in number will cause more humans to come in contact with lone star ticks, and could possible lead to a human being affected by the virus.

== Signs and symptoms ==
The virus is shown to have a cytopathic effect on both human (HeLa) and monkey (vero) cells. As part of the minimal research that has been done, death occurred in mice that were infected with the virus.

== Risk factors ==
No human cases have been found thus far, however evidence points to the fact that it does have pathogenic effects in humans. This means this disease could likely be something that affects humans in the future, or has had an effect, but has not been documented, or traced back to this source.

it has a Biosafety level of 2.

== Research ==
After the virus was isolated from the A. americanum nymph, it was inoculated into many test animals including: newborn and full-grown mice, woodchucks, raccoons, as well as chicken and duck eggs. The virus was most pathogenic to the newborn mice, causing death in many of them. In the full grown mice, their reaction to the virus was determined by how the virus was inoculated in them. Mice who received the virus intraperitoneally, showed no reaction or symptoms to the virus. However about seventy-five percent of mice who were inoculated in their cerebrum showed sickness or even death, due to the virus. One out of the six woodchucks studied showed signs of being infected while the others had no response to the inoculation. Only raccoons developed antibodies against the virus, and did not show any other signs of being exposed. The chicken and duck eggs were not affected in any way.
