= Adria virus =

Virus classification
- (unranked): Virus
- Realm: Riboviria
- Kingdom: Orthornavirae
- Phylum: Negarnaviricota
- Class: Bunyaviricetes
- Order: Hareavirales
- Family: Phenuiviridae
- Genus: Phlebovirus
- Strain: Adria virus

Species of virus

Adria virus (ADRV), named after the Adriatic Sea, is a phlebovirus transmitted by sandflies that can cause a febrile illness in humans. It has been found in sandfly populations in Albania and northern Greece.

== Background of discovery ==
In 2005, Papa and Velo collected 438 sandflies across Albania and divided them into 12 pools. In two pools, phlebovirus RNA was detected. One consisted of 6 sandflies and the other 23 sandflies. Sequencing and phylogenetic study elucidated that the two strains are very similar, differing only 0.08% at the nucleotide level. They were quite different from all known phleboviruses. This strain was provisionally named Adria virus. Sequences were submitted in GenBank under the accession numbers HM043725 and HM043726.

== Pathogenesis in humans ==
In 2011, Anagnostou reported genetic detection and sequencing of an Adria virus in a boy who was hospitalized because of a simple febrile seizure. This sequence was identical to the one in sandflies detected in a coastal area in Albania. The patient was febrile and had vomited once. He had no previous neurologic or developmental disabilities and no family history of epilepsy or febrile seizures. Clinical examinations including a thorough general and detailed neurologic evaluation revealed no abnormalities except mild rhinitis. Blood levels of various proteins and metabolites were in the physiological level. An electroencephalogram showed no brain malfunctions. After two days of hospitalization, he recovered from the disease, had no symptoms and was discharged from the hospital. One year after discharge from the hospital, his mother reported that the child remained well without any recurrence of febrile or any other type of seizures.

Viral RNA was extracted from the patient's blood sample and reverse transcription-PCR was used to amplify a 222-bp fragment of the RNA segment of phleboviruses. The obtained sequence was identical to sequences collected in 2005 in Adriatic coastal region of Albania. The Adria virus is distinct from other recognized members of the genus phlebovirus and clusters with phleboviruses of the Salehabad serocomplex, such as the Salehabad virus and Arbia virus, differing by 21.6% and 29.6% from Salehabad and Arbia at the nucleotide level and by 3% and 17.7% at the amino acid level.

The detection of the Adria virus sequence inside the patient's blood sample implies that the virus is pathogenic to humans. As the virus was distinct from the classification of virus, serologic testing of the samples resulted negative for phlebovirus. Although the symptoms of the patient were mild, further studies are needed to show the detailed pathogenesis in public health.
