= Rift Valley fever =

Human and livestock viral disease

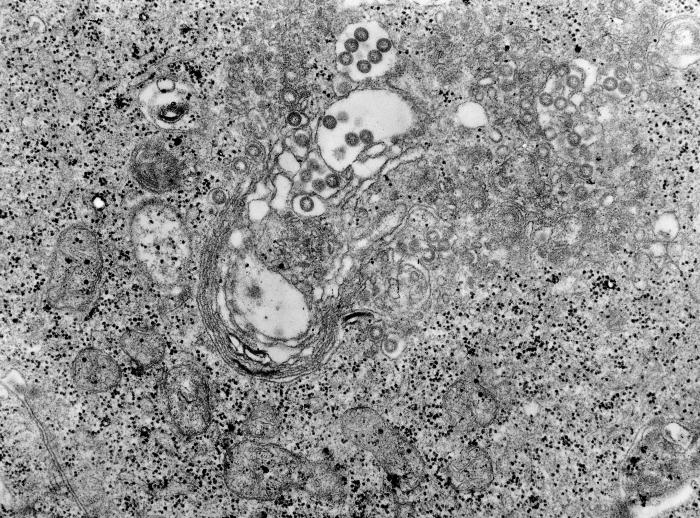
- TEM micrograph of tissue infected with Rift Valley fever virus
- Specialty: Infectious diseases, veterinary medicine
- Symptoms: Fever, muscle pains, headaches
- Complications: Loss of sight, confusion, bleeding, liver problems
- Duration: Up to a week
- Causes: Phlebovirus spread by an infected animal or mosquito
- Diagnostic method: Finding antibodies or the virus in the blood
- Prevention: Vaccinating animals against the disease, decreasing mosquito bites
- Treatment: Supportive care
- Frequency: Outbreaks in Africa and Arabia

Rift Valley fever (RVF) is a viral disease of humans and livestock that can cause mild to severe symptoms. The mild symptoms may include: fever, muscle pains, and headaches which often last for up to a week. The severe symptoms may include: loss of sight beginning three weeks after the infection, infections of the brain causing severe headaches and confusion, and bleeding together with liver problems which may occur within the first few days. Those who have bleeding have a chance of death as high as 50%.

The disease is caused by the RVF virus. It is spread by either touching infected animal blood, breathing in the air around an infected animal being butchered, drinking raw milk from an infected animal, or the bite of infected mosquitoes. Animals like cows, sheep, goats, and camels may be affected. In these animals it is spread mostly by mosquitoes. It does not appear that one person can infect another. The disease is diagnosed by finding antibodies against the virus or the virus itself in the blood. Prevention of the disease in humans is accomplished by vaccinating animals against the disease. This must be done before an outbreak occurs because if it is done during an outbreak it may worsen the situation. Additional preventive measures include avoiding contact with infected animal blood or tissues, safe handling of animal products, and protection against mosquito bites. Stopping the movement of animals during an outbreak may also be useful, as may decreasing mosquito numbers and avoiding their bites. A human vaccine has been developed, but it is not licensed or commercially available. There is no specific treatment and medical efforts are supportive.

Outbreaks of the disease have only occurred in Africa and Arabia. Outbreaks usually occur during periods of increased rain which increases the number of mosquitoes. Outbreaks typically occur during years of unusually heavy rainfall and flooding, which increase mosquito hatching and transmission.The disease was first reported among livestock in Rift Valley of Kenya in the early 1900s, and the virus was first isolated in 1931.

== Signs and symptoms ==
In humans, the virus can cause several syndromes. Usually, they have either no symptoms or only a mild illness with fever, headache, muscle pains, and liver abnormalities. In a small percentage of cases (< 2%), the illness can progress to hemorrhagic fever syndrome, meningoencephalitis (inflammation of the brain and tissues lining the brain), or affect the eye. Patients who become ill usually experience fever, generalised weakness, back pain, dizziness, and weight loss at the onset of the illness. Typically, people recover within two to seven days after onset. About 1% of people with the disease die of it. In livestock, the fatality level is significantly higher. Pregnant livestock infected with RVF abort virtually 100% of foetuses. In livestock, outbreaks of RVF are often first recognized by a wave of unexplained abortions.

Other signs in livestock include vomiting and diarrhea, respiratory disease, fever, lethargy, anorexia, and sudden death in young animals.

== Cause ==
=== Virology ===
Rift Valley fever virus
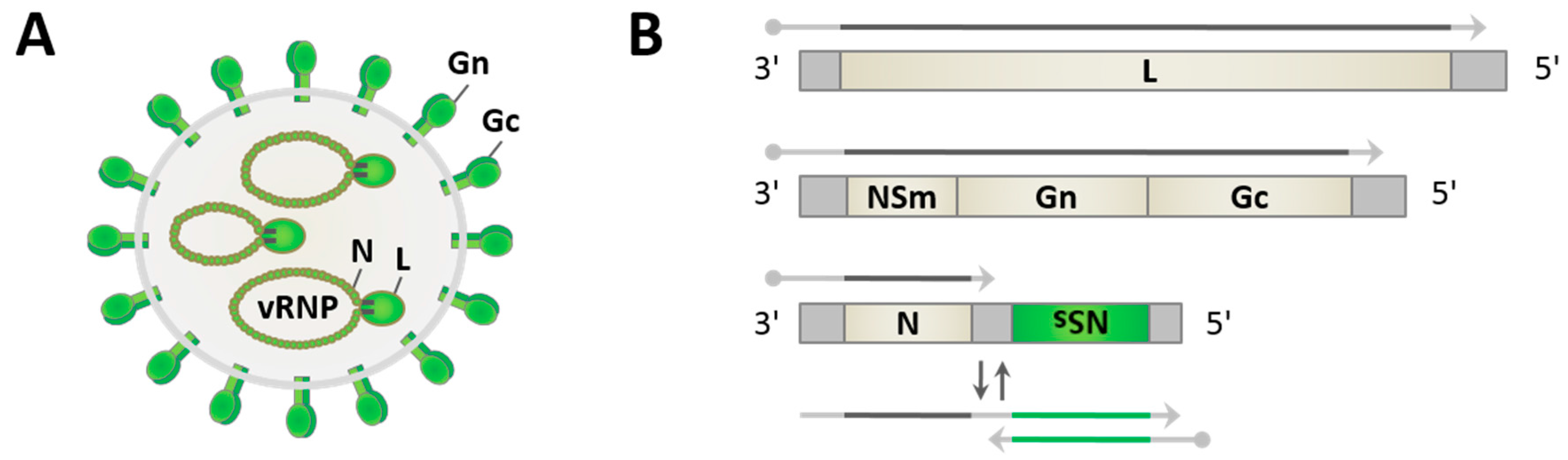
- Phlebovirus virion and genome

Virus classification
- (unranked): Virus
- Realm: Riboviria
- Kingdom: Orthornavirae
- Phylum: Negarnaviricota
- Class: Bunyaviricetes
- Order: Hareavirales
- Family: Phenuiviridae
- Genus: Phlebovirus
- Species: Phlebovirus riftense

Synonyms
- Rift Valley fever phlebovirus

The virus belongs to the Bunyaviricetes class. This is a class of enveloped negative single-stranded RNA viruses. All bunyaviruses have an outer lipid envelope with two glycoproteins—G(N) and G(C)—required for cell entry. They deliver their genome into the host-cell cytoplasm via endocytosis of prepackaged virions .

The virus' G(C) protein has a class II membrane fusion protein architecture similar to that found in flaviviruses and alphaviruses. This structural similarity suggests that there may be a common origin for these viral families.

The virus' 11.5 kb tripartite genome is composed of single-stranded RNA. As a Phlebovirus, it has an ambisense genome. Its L and M segments are negative-sense, but its S segment is ambisense. These three genome segments code for six major proteins: L protein (viral polymerase), the two glycoproteins G(N) and G(C), the nucleocapsid N protein, and the nonstructural NSs and NSm proteins.

=== Transmission ===
The virus is transmitted through mosquito vectors, as well as through contact with the tissue of infected animals. Two species—Culex tritaeniorhynchus and Aedes vexans—are known to transmit the virus. Other potential vectors include Aedes caspius, Aedes mcintosh, Aedes ochraceus, Culex pipiens, Culex antennatus, Culex perexiguus, Culex zombaensis and Culex quinquefasciatus. Contact with infected tissue is considered to be the main source of human infections. The virus has been isolated from two bat species: the Peter's epauletted fruit bat (Micropteropus pusillus) and the aba roundleaf bat (Hipposideros abae), which are believed to be reservoirs for the virus.

== Pathogenesis ==
Although many components encoded by RVFV's RNA play an important role in the virus' pathology, the nonstructural protein encoded on the S segment (NSs) is the only component that has been found to directly affect the host. NSs is hostile and combative against the host interferon (IFNs) antiviral response. IFNs are essential for the immune system to fight off viral infections in a host. This inhibitory mechanism is believed to be due to several reasons, the first being, competitive inhibition of the formation of the transcription factor. On this transcription factor, NSs interacts with and binds to a subunit that is needed for RNA polymerase I and II. This interaction cause competitive inhibition with another transcription factor component and prevents the assembly process of the transcription factor complex, which results in the suppression of the host antiviral response. Transcription suppression is believed to be another mechanism of this inhibitory process. This occurs when an area of NSs interacts with and binds to the host's protein, SAP30 and forms a complex. This complex causes histone acetylation to regress, which is needed for transcriptional activation of the IFN promoter. This causes IFN expression to be obstructed. Lastly, NSs has also been known to affect regular activity of double-stranded RNA-dependent protein kinase R. This protein is involved in cellular antiviral responses in the host. When RVFV can enter the host's DNA, NSs forms a filamentous structure in the nucleus. This allows the virus to interact with specific areas of the host's DNA that relates to segregation defects and induction of chromosome continuity. This increases host infectivity and decreases the host's antiviral response.

== Diagnosis ==
Diagnosis relies on viral isolation from tissues, or serological testing with an ELISA. Other methods of diagnosis include Nucleic Acid Testing (NAT), cell culture, and IgM antibody assays. As of September 2016, the Kenya Medical Research Institute (KEMRI) has developed a product called Immunoline, designed to diagnose the disease in humans much faster than in previous methods.

== Prevention ==
A person's chances of becoming infected can be reduced by taking measures to decrease contact with bodily fluids or tissues of infected animals and protect against mosquitoes and other bloodsucking insects. The use of mosquito repellents and bed nets are two effective methods. For persons working with animals in RVF-endemic areas, wearing protective equipment to avoid any exposure to blood or tissues of animals that may potentially be infected is an important protective measure. Potentially, establishing environmental monitoring and case surveillance systems may aid in the prediction and control of future RVF outbreaks.

No vaccines are currently available for humans. While vaccines have been developed for humans, it has only been used experimentally for scientific personnel in high-risk environments. Trials of several vaccines, such as NDBR-103 and TSI-GSD 200, are ongoing. Different types of vaccines for veterinary use are available. The killed vaccines are impractical in routine animal field vaccination because of the need for multiple injections. Live vaccines require a single injection but are known to cause birth defects and abortions in sheep and induce only low-level protection in cattle. The live-attenuated vaccine, MP-12, has demonstrated promising results in laboratory trials in domesticated animals, but more research is needed before the vaccine can be used in the field. The live-attenuated clone 13 vaccine was recently registered and used in South Africa. Alternative vaccines using molecular recombinant constructs are in development and show promising results.

A vaccine has been conditionally approved for use in animals in the US. It has been shown that knockout of the NSs and NSm nonstructural proteins of this virus produces an effective vaccine in sheep as well.

== Epidemiology ==
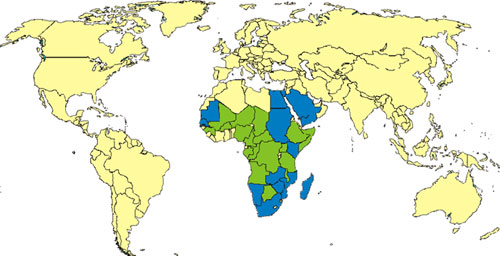
Distribution of Rift Valley fever in Africa: Blue, countries with endemic disease and substantial outbreaks of RVF; green, countries known to have some cases, periodic isolation of virus, or serologic evidence of RVF

RVF outbreaks occur across sub-Saharan Africa, with outbreaks occurring elsewhere infrequently. Outbreaks of this disease usually correspond with the warm phases of the EI Niño/Southern Oscillation. During this time there is an increase in rainfall, flooding, and greenness of vegetation index, which leads to an increase in mosquito vectors. RVFV can be transmitted vertically in mosquitos, meaning that the virus can be passed from the mother to her offspring. During dry conditions, the virus can remain viable for many years in the egg. Mosquitos lay their eggs in water, where they eventually hatch. As water is essential for mosquito eggs to hatch, rainfall and flooding cause an increase in the mosquito population and an increased potential for the virus.

As with other infectious diseases, climate change is expected to increase the prevalence of Rift Valley fever. In domestic animals, climate-induced heat stress can directly impair animals' immunity against all diseases, and climate change also impacts the distribution of many livestock pathogens themselves. Due to these factors, Rift Valley Fever outbreaks in East African livestock are expected to increase.

The first documented outbreak was identified in Kenya in 1931, in sheep, cattle, and humans; another severe outbreak in the country in 1950–1951 involved 100,000 deaths in livestock and an unrecorded number of humans with fever. An outbreak occurred in South Africa in 1974–1976, with more than 500,000 infected animals and the first deaths in humans. In Egypt in 1977–78, an estimated 200,000 people were infected and there were at least 594 deaths. In Kenya in 1998, the virus killed more than 400 people. Since then, there have been outbreaks in Saudi Arabia and Yemen (2000), East Africa (2006–2007), Sudan (2007), South Africa (2010), Uganda (2016), Kenya (2018), Mayotte (2018–2019), Kenya (2020–2021) and Burundi (2022).

== Biological weapon ==
Rift Valley fever was one of more than a dozen agents that the United States researched as potential biological weapons before the nation suspended its biological weapons program in 1969.

== Research ==
The disease is one of several identified by WHO as a likely cause of a future epidemic in a new plan developed after the Ebola epidemic for urgent research and development toward new diagnostic tests, vaccines and medicines.

== One Health Perspective ==
Rift Valley fever (RVF) is widely recognized as a One Health disease because its transmission and control involve interactions among humans, animals, and the environment. Human infections are commonly associated with exposure to infected livestock, and mosquitoes, while outbreaks in animals can result in substantial economic losses.Environmental factors such as heavy rainfall and flooding contribute to mosquito population growth and play and important role in the emergence and spread of RVF.

=== Human Health ===
Rift Valley fever (RVF) is a zoonotic disease primarily affecting livestock, but also known to cause illness in humans. Humans are most commonly infected through direct contact with organs, tissues, blood and other bodily fluids during veterinarian procedures, the handling of aborted animal fetuses and the slaughtering of infected animals. No human to human transmission has been documented. Occupational exposure is a risk factor for infection. Groups considered to be at risk due to their proximity to infected animals include veterinarians, farmers, slaughterhouse workers and laboratory workers. Human disease manifestations are variable in severity. Severe disease may result in hepatitis, meningoencephalitis, hemorrhagic fever or ocular disease with possible vision loss. However, most infected individuals are asymptomatic or develop mild flu-like symptoms. Additionally, there are recorded instances of RVF inducing obstetric syndromes.

=== Animal Health ===
Rift Valley fever (RFV) has major impacts on animal health, especially among camels, sheep, goats, cattle and buffalo. Young animals are particularly affected, with mortality rates among goat kids and lambs ranging from 70-100% during severe outbreaks, while adult mortality rates range from 10-20%. Another notable finding is that infected pregnant animals routinely experience abortion storms, a trademark feature of this disease. The rapid disease spread among livestock can additionally result in hefty production losses (agricultural, milk production), loss of economic stability, income and a substantial loss in food sources.

=== Environmental Drivers ===
Environmental factors play a critical role in the emergence and transmission of Rift Valley fever (RVF). Outbreaks are known to occur following periods of flooding or heavy rainfall, creating favorable breeding conditions for mosquito vectors. Additionally, anthropogenic environmental changes contributes to disease emergence. Construction of dams, irrigation systems and water storage projects can create permanent mosquito breeding habitats, increasing rates of breeding and transmission. Aedes mosquitoes are also able to transmit the virus to their eggs, which can survive dry conditions for many years, allowing RVF to subsist between epidemics until favorable conditions resume.

=== Integrated Surveillance and Control ===
Because Rift Valley fever (RVF) outbreaks are often dependent on climate conditions, environmental surveillance has become a significant part of disease prevention. Early warning systems now incorporate satellite monitoring, flooding events, rainfall patterns and vegetation changes to help identify regions at increased risk of RVF outbreaks. This allows for outbreak preparation, including livestock vaccinations and public health planning.

Veterinary surveillance can provide early warning signals for impending RVF outbreaks. Livestock abortion storms, sudden neonatal mortality increase and increases in animal infections may precede human disease, and can assist in public health outbreak preparedness.

Livestock vaccination is considered one of the most effective methods to reduce disease transmission and mitigate outbreak severity. Modeling studies suggest that vaccination programs may substantially reduce disease morbidity and mortality.

Additional prevention measures include mosquito control programs, public health education, personal protective equipment for individuals handling animals, movement restrictions during outbreaks and coordinated communication amongst various sectors.

=== One Health Approach ===
Rift Valley fever (RVF) is often recognized as a model disease for implementing a One Health approach as its transmission depends on interactions among animal hosts, mosquito vectors, environmental conditions and human populations. Several international organizations, including the World Health Organization (WHO), the Food and Agriculture Organization of the United Nations (FAO) and the World Organisation for Animal Health (WOAH), recommend a coordinated, multidisciplinary approach involving public health agencies, physicians, veterinary services, epidemiologists, environmental scientists, and laboratory networks. This collaborative framework supports surveillance, outbreak preparedness, outbreak response, and post outbreak evaluation, while improving communication across sectors.

== See also ==
- Coalition for Epidemic Preparedness Innovations
