= Sandfly fever Naples virus =

Virus classification
- (unranked): Virus
- Realm: Riboviria
- Kingdom: Orthornavirae
- Phylum: Negarnaviricota
- Class: Bunyaviricetes
- Order: Hareavirales
- Family: Phenuiviridae
- Genus: Phlebovirus
- Species: Phlebovirus napoliense

Synonyms
- Naples phlebovirus; Sandfly fever Naples phlebovirus

Species of virus

Sandfly fever Naples virus is an antigenic species of genus Phlebovirus within the family Phenuiviridae of the order Hareavirales. It is an enveloped RNA virus with a tripartite genome. Its natural reservoir is sandflies. The SFNV serogroup consists of two main serocomplexes associated with disease in humans, the Naples and Sicilian serocomplexes. Sandfly fever induces myalgia, fever, and elevated liver enzymes in humans. It is difficult to diagnose outside endemic areas.

== Natural reservoir ==
Phlebotomine sandflies (Psychodidae) are the natural reservoir and transmit to humans via bite. Psychodidae has a wide geographical distribution.
