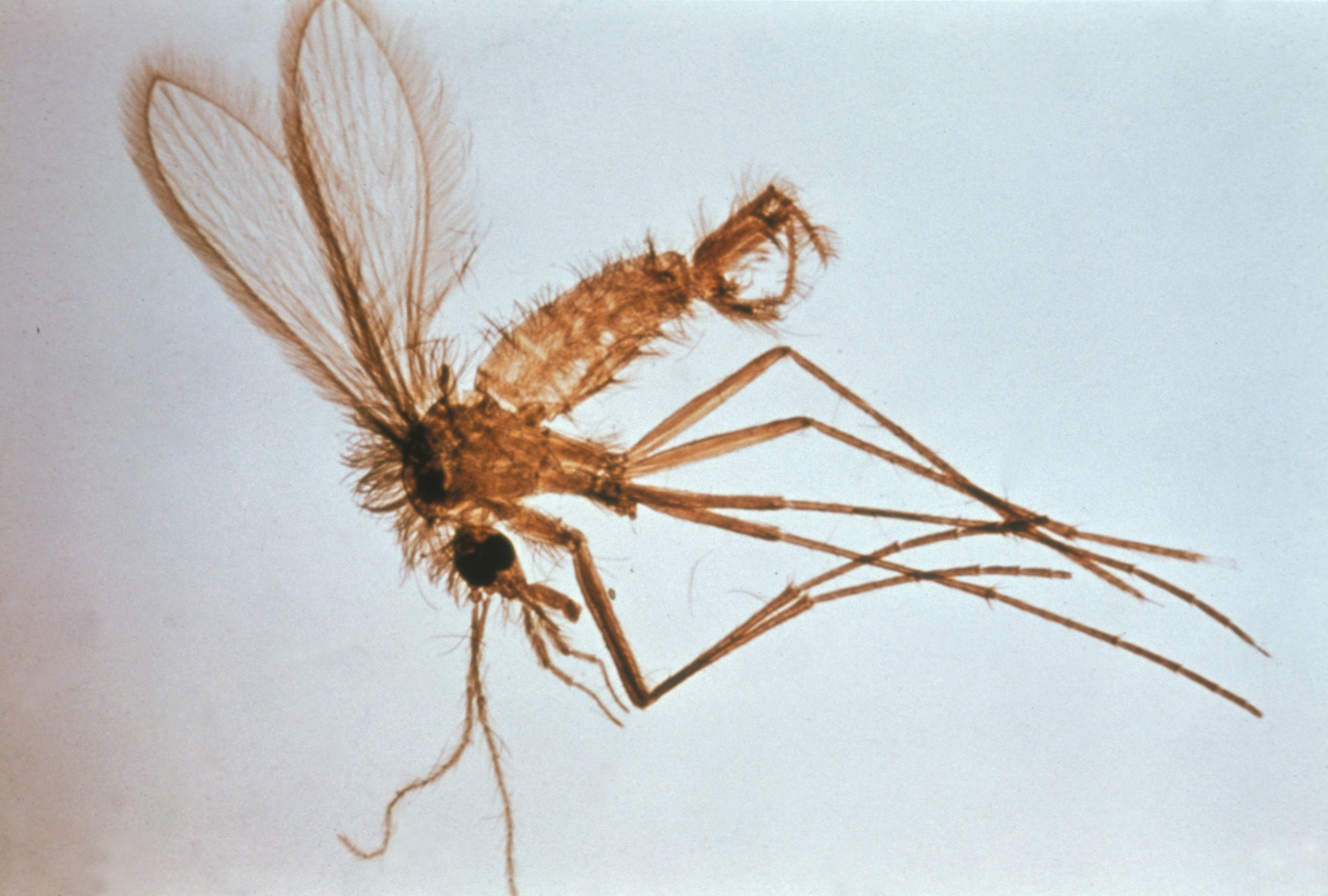
- A male Phlebotomus fly

Scientific classification
- Kingdom: Animalia
- Phylum: Arthropoda
- Clade: Pancrustacea
- Class: Insecta
- Order: Diptera
- Family: Psychodidae
- Subfamily: Phlebotominae
- Genus: Phlebotomus; Rondani & Berté, 1840

Species
- P. alexandri P. ariasi P. argentipes P. azizi P. balcanicus P. brevis P. chabaudi P. kyreniae P. langeroni P. longicuspis P. longiductus P. major P. mascittii P. papatasi P. perfiliewi P. perniciosus P. riouxi P. sergenti P. simici P. tobbi

= Phlebotomus =

Genus of flies

Phlebotomus is a genus of "sand flies" in the Diptera family Psychodidae. In the past, they have sometimes been considered to belong in a separate family, Phlebotomidae, but this alternative classification has not gained wide acceptance.

== Epidemiology ==
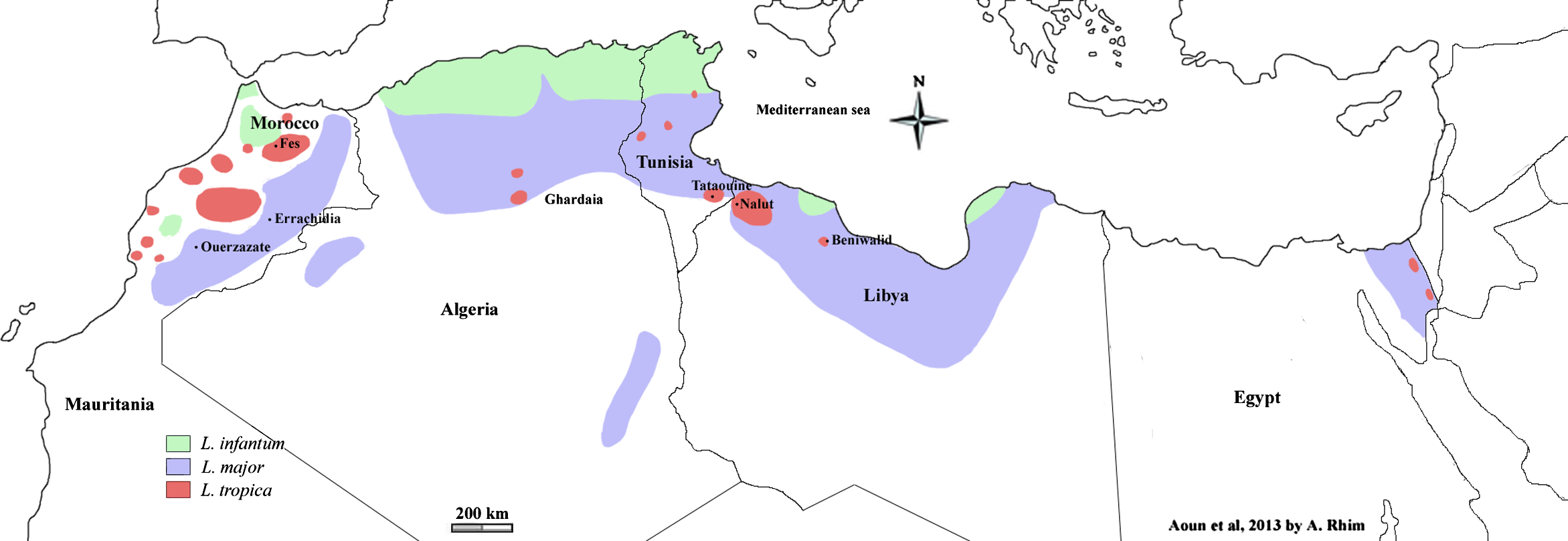
Cutaneous leishmaniasis, a disease transmitted by Phlebotomus, in North Africa; Leishmania infantum = green, Leishmania major = blue, Leishmania tropica = red

In the Old World, Phlebotomus sand flies are primarily responsible for the transmission of leishmaniasis, an important parasitic disease, while transmission in the New World, is generally via sand flies of the genus Lutzomyia. The protozoan parasite itself is a species of the genus Leishmania. Leishmaniasis normally finds a mammalian reservoir in rodents and other small animals such as canids (canine leishmaniasis) and hyraxes. The female sand fly carries the Leishmania protozoa from infected animals after feeding, thus transmitting the disease, while the male feeds on plant nectar.

The parasite Leishmania donovani is the main causative agent of visceral leishmaniasis (VL) in India, Nepal, and Bangladesh, where it is transmitted by the sand flies of the species Phlebotomus argentipes. This species of sand flies was on the brink of elimination in India during the 1960s following the widespread use of DDT for malaria control. However, there was a resurgence in their population a decade later.

Phlebotomus species are also vectors for bartonellosis, verruga peruana, and pappataci fever, an arboviral disease caused by sandfly fever viruses such as the Naples and Sicilian strains of the genus Phlebovirus (family Bunyaviridae), which also includes the closely related Toscana virus. In Egypt, two species of medical importance are Phlebotomus papatasii and P. langerni. These flies are short-lived. Females are bloodsuckers at night; males feed on plant juices. Adults are poor fliers, they usually hop for short distances.

== Morphology ==
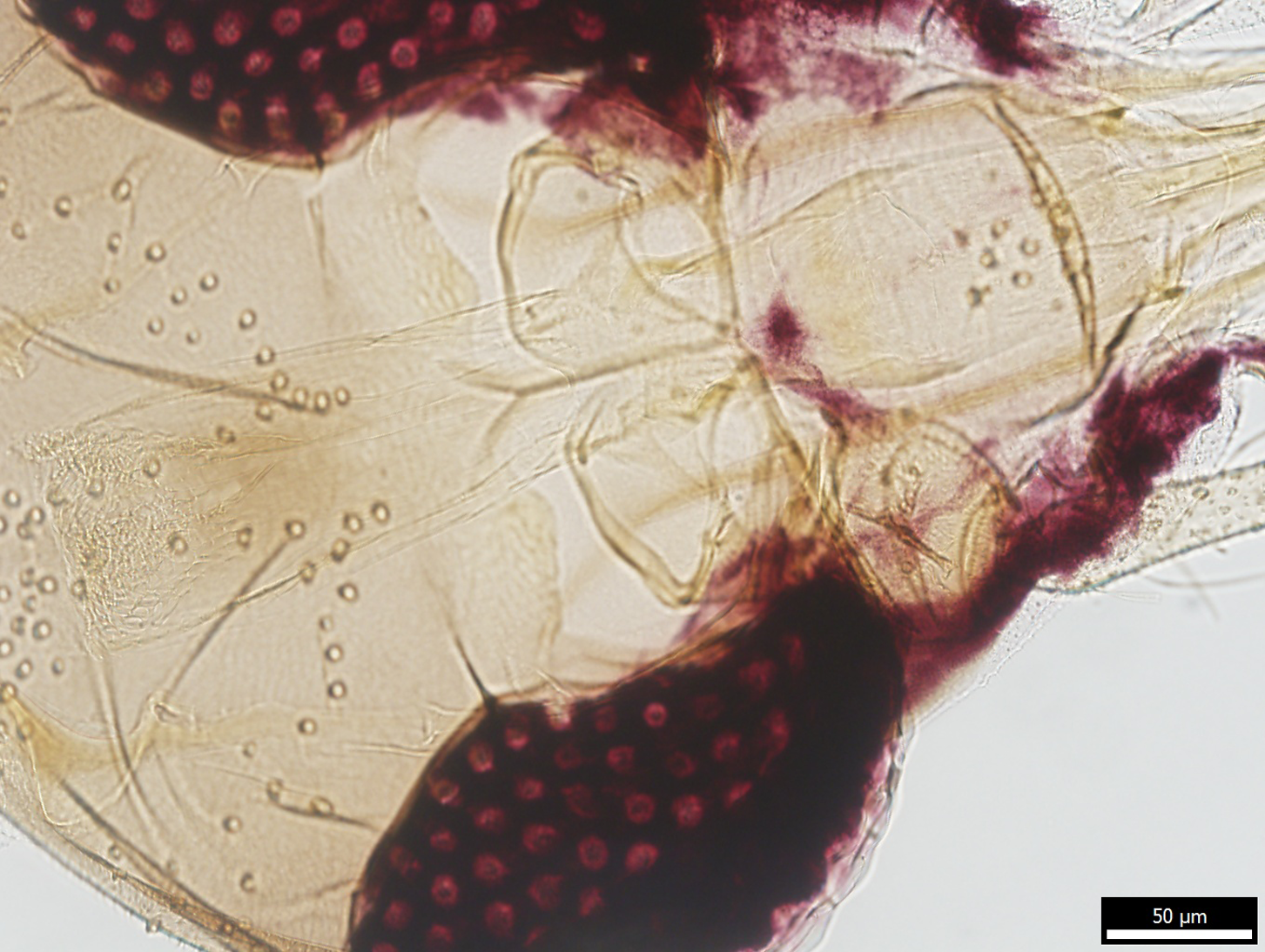
Pharynx of Phlebotomus mascittii

Adults are about 1.5–3.0 mm long and yellowish in colour, with conspicuous black eyes, and hairy bodies, wings, and legs. The oval lanceolate wings are carried erect on the humped thorax. Males possess long prominent genital terminalia known as claspers. Females have a pair of anal recti.

== Lifecycle ==
Batches of thirty to seventy eggs are laid in cracks and holes in the ground, in crevices in masonry and among leaf litter. The eggs require a humid environment to avoid desiccation, and hatch within about twenty days. The larvae are mainly scavengers, consuming fungi, leaf mould, rotting vegetation and detritus. The larvae are recognisable by their black heads, greyish twelve segmented bodies and conspicuous feathery, branching bristles on head and body, and two pairs of long hairs on the tip of the abdomen. The larvae pass through four instars over the course of three to four weeks, before selecting an upright position and pupating, with the final larval skin remaining attached to the pupa, the long hairs protruding. In cooler climates, the larvae may diapause over winter. Adults emerge from the pupae after about one to two weeks. The whole cycle takes thirty to sixty days unless the larvae diapause, when it may take four or five months. Laboratory colonies of several Phlebotomus species have been established for experimental study of their biology, behaviour, mutual relations with disease agents, and for testing methods of vector control.

== Behaviour ==
The adult flies are nocturnal, spending the day sheltering in dark humid places such as on bark, among foliage, among leaf litter, in animal burrows, in termite mounds, and in cracks and crevices. At nightfall they emerge to feed on sugary secretions and plant sap. The female needs a blood meal before it can reproduce; some species feed on mammals including humans, while others also feed on birds, reptiles and amphibians. The fly is a weak flier and takes short flights to find a victim, adopting a "hopping" style of flight when close to a host. Some sandflies are "exophagic", living entirely out of doors, while others are "endophagic" and invade houses. In the tropics, adults may breed all year round, but in temperate climates the adults die off in the autumn and new adults emerge in the spring. The adults have short mouthparts and are unable to bite through clothing.
