= Pappataci fever =

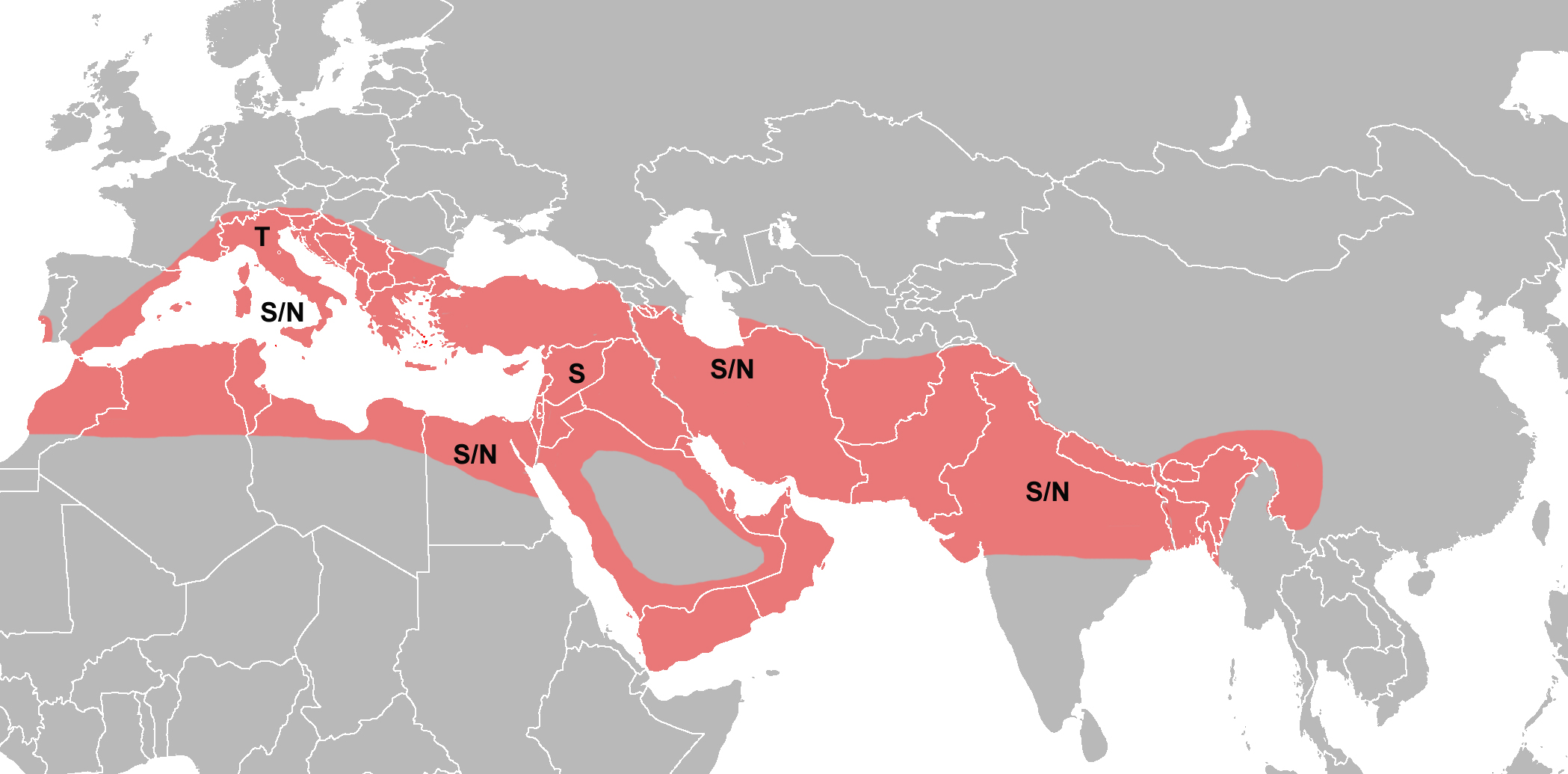
- Distribution of pappataci fever by serotype: T, Toscana, S, Sicilian; N, Naples
- Specialty: Infectious diseases

Pappataci fever (also known as phlebotomus fever and, somewhat confusingly, sandfly fever and three-day fever) is a vector-borne febrile arboviral infection caused by three serotypes of Phlebovirus. It occurs in subtropical regions of the Eastern Hemisphere. The name, pappataci fever, comes from the Italian word for sandfly; it is the union of the words pappa (usually this is used as a generic name for food, but in this case it is a verb meaning "eating") and taci (silent), distinguishing these insects from blood-feeding mosquitoes, which produce a typical noise while flying.

== Signs and symptoms ==
A few days after the infective bite, a feeling of lassitude, abdominal distress and chills develop followed by fever of 39 to 40 °C (102 to 104 °F), severe frontal headaches, muscle and joint aches, flushing of the face and a fast heart rate. After two days the fever begins to subside and the temperature returns to normal. Fatigue, a slow heart rate and low blood pressure may persist from a few days to several weeks but complete recovery is the rule.

== Cause ==
Three serotypes of Phlebovirus are known as the causative agents: Naples virus, Sicilian virus and Toscana virus.

== Diagnosis ==
Although commercial tests are not readily available, diagnosis can be confirmed by serology-based assays or quantitative PCR by laboratories that have developed assays to perform such identification.

== Prevention ==
Prevention of sandfly bites, and control of sandflies and their breeding grounds with insecticides are the principal methods for prevention. Mosquito nets may not be sufficient to prevent sandfly bites.

== Treatment ==
There is no specific treatment for the disease. Pain killers and fluid replacement may be useful.

== Epidemiology ==
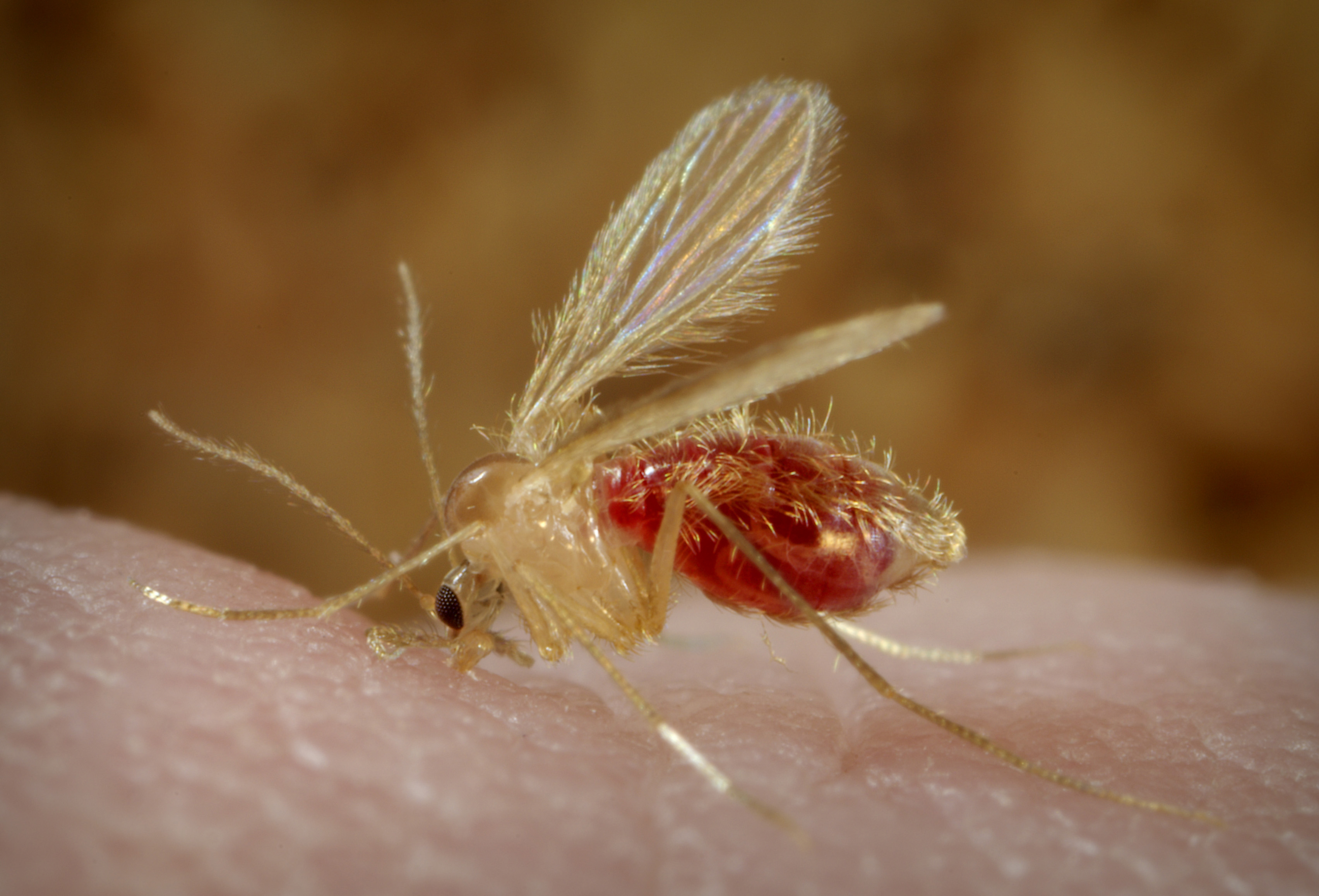
Phlebotomus papatasi taking a bloodmeal

Pappataci fever is prevalent in the subtropical zone of the Eastern Hemisphere between 20°N and 45°N, particularly in Southern Europe, North Africa, the Balkans, Eastern Mediterranean, Iraq, Iran, Pakistan, Afghanistan and India.

The disease is transmitted by the bites of phlebotomine sandflies of the genus Phlebotomus, in particular Phlebotomus papatasi, Phlebotomus perniciosus and Phlebotomus perfiliewi. The sandfly becomes infected when biting an infected human in the period between 48 hours before the onset of fever and 24 hours after the end of the fever, and remains infected for its lifetime. Besides this horizontal virus transmission from man to sandfly, the virus can be transmitted in insects transovarially, from an infected female sandfly to its offspring.

Pappataci fever is seldom recognised in endemic populations because it is mixed with other febrile illnesses of childhood, but it is more well known among immigrants and military personnel from non-endemic regions.
