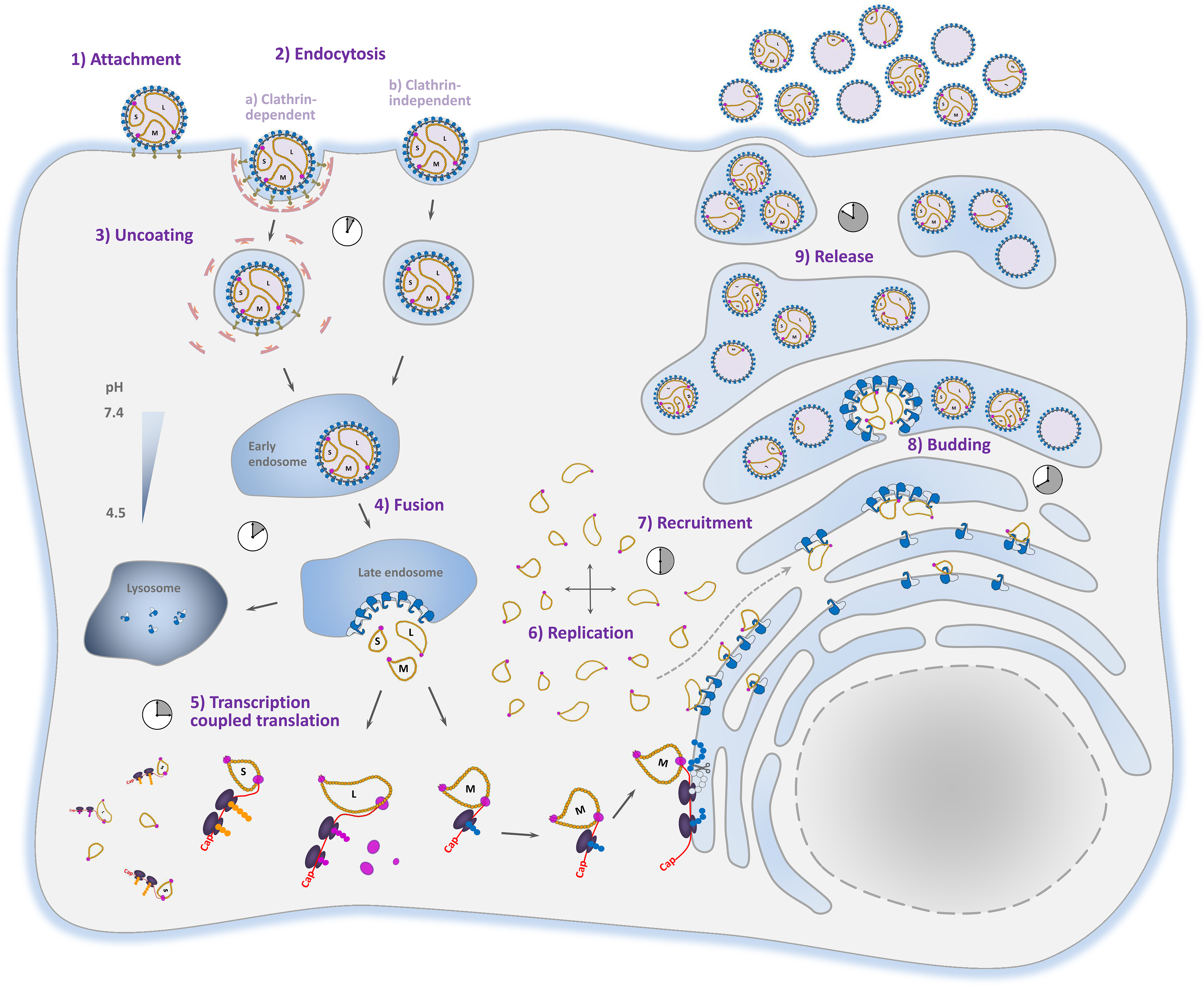
- Rift Valley fever virus replication cycle

Virus classification
- (unranked): Virus
- Realm: Riboviria
- Kingdom: Orthornavirae
- Phylum: Negarnaviricota
- Class: Bunyaviricetes
- Order: Hareavirales
- Family: Phenuiviridae

= Phenuiviridae =

Family of viruses

Phenuiviridae is a family of negative-strand RNA viruses in the order Hareavirales. Ruminants, camels, humans, and mosquitoes serve as natural hosts.

== Virology ==
=== Structure ===
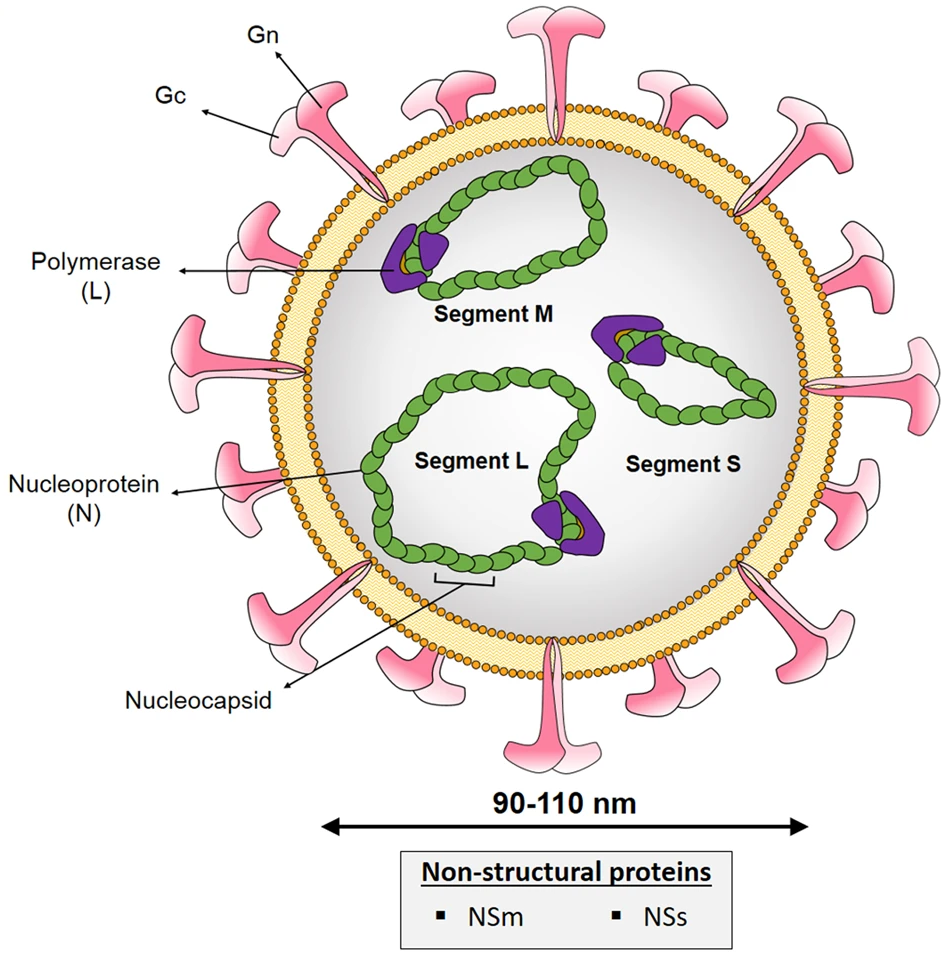
Rift Valley fever virus structure

Members of Phenuiviridae are enveloped viruses with helical capsid morphology. Envelope glycoproteins of these viruses are distributed with icosahedral symmetry (T=12).

=== Genome ===
Phenuiviridae is a negative-sense single-stranded RNA virus family. Its genome is segmented into three pieces: L segment (encoding RNA-dependent RNA polymerase), M segment, and S segment.

Some members of the family have ambisense gene encoding on the S segment (nucleocapsid proteins). The M segment includes envelope glycoproteins encoded in a polyprotein that is cleaved by host proteases. Multiple different proteins can be encoded on the M segment due to leaky scanning by the ribosome.

=== Life cycle ===
RNA transcripts are capped through cap snatching, but not polyadenylated. Translation is terminated by a hairpin sequence at the end of each RNA transcript.

== Taxonomy ==
The family contains the following genera:

- Bandavirus
- Beidivirus
- Bocivirus
- Citricivirus
- Coguvirus
- Entovirus
- Fusavirus
- Goukovirus
- Horwuvirus
- Hudivirus
- Hudovirus
- Ixovirus
- Laulavirus
- Lentinuvirus
- Mechlorovirus
- Mobuvirus
- Phasivirus
- Phlebovirus
- Pidchovirus
- Rubodvirus
- Tanzavirus
- Tenuivirus
- Uukuvirus
- Wenrivirus

== See also ==
- Lone star virus
