= List of MeSH codes (C02) =

The following is a partial list of the "C" codes for Medical Subject Headings (MeSH), as defined by the United States National Library of Medicine (NLM).

This list continues the information at List of MeSH codes (C01). Codes following these are found at List of MeSH codes (C03). For other MeSH codes, see List of MeSH codes.

The source for this content is the set of 2006 MeSH Trees from the NLM.

A section with updated MeSH virus-disease tree based on current NLM XML release

== MeSH C02 – virus diseases ==
=== MeSH C02.081 – arbovirus infections ===
==== MeSH C02.081.270 – dengue fever ====
- MeSH C02.081.270.200 – dengue hemorrhagic fever

==== MeSH C02.081.343 – encephalitis, arbovirus ====
- MeSH C02.081.343.340 – encephalitis, california
- MeSH C02.081.343.345 – encephalitis, japanese
- MeSH C02.081.343.350 – encephalitis, st. louis
- MeSH C02.081.343.360 – encephalitis, tick-borne
- MeSH C02.081.343.950 – west nile fever

==== MeSH C02.081.355 – encephalomyelitis, equine ====
- MeSH C02.081.355.177 – encephalomyelitis, eastern equine
- MeSH C02.081.355.355 – encephalomyelitis, venezuelan equine
- MeSH C02.081.355.677 – encephalomyelitis, western equine

==== MeSH C02.081.885 – tick-borne diseases ====
- MeSH C02.081.885.125 – african swine fever
- MeSH C02.081.885.200 – colorado tick fever
- MeSH C02.081.885.400 – encephalitis, tick-borne
- MeSH C02.081.885.430 – hemorrhagic fever, crimean
- MeSH C02.081.885.440 – hemorrhagic fever, omsk
- MeSH C02.081.885.475 – kyasanur forest disease
- MeSH C02.081.885.550 – nairobi sheep disease

=== MeSH C02.182 – central nervous system viral diseases ===
==== MeSH C02.182.500 – encephalitis ====
- MeSH C02.182.500.300 – encephalitis, viral
- MeSH C02.182.500.300.300 – encephalitis, arbovirus
- MeSH C02.182.500.300.300.200 – encephalitis, california
- MeSH C02.182.500.300.300.250 – encephalitis, japanese
- MeSH C02.182.500.300.300.300 – encephalitis, st. louis
- MeSH C02.182.500.300.300.350 – encephalitis, tick-borne
- MeSH C02.182.500.300.300.850 – west nile fever
- MeSH C02.182.500.300.350 – encephalitis, herpes simplex
- MeSH C02.182.500.300.400 – encephalitis, varicella zoster
- MeSH C02.182.500.300.450 – encephalomyelitis, equine
- MeSH C02.182.500.300.450.200 – encephalomyelitis, eastern equine
- MeSH C02.182.500.300.450.250 – encephalomyelitis, venezuelan equine
- MeSH C02.182.500.300.450.300 – encephalomyelitis, western equine
- MeSH C02.182.500.300.500 – leukoencephalopathy, progressive multifocal
- MeSH C02.182.500.300.600 – subacute sclerosing panencephalitis

==== MeSH C02.182.550 – meningitis, viral ====
- MeSH C02.182.550.500 – lymphocytic choriomeningitis
- MeSH C02.182.550.600 – meningitis, aseptic

==== MeSH C02.182.600 – myelitis ====
- MeSH C02.182.600.600 – paraparesis, tropical spastic
- MeSH C02.182.600.700 – poliomyelitis
- MeSH C02.182.600.700.600 – poliomyelitis, bulbar
- MeSH C02.182.600.700.800 – postpoliomyelitis syndrome

=== MeSH C02.256 – dna virus infections ===
==== MeSH C02.256.076 – adenoviridae infections ====
- MeSH C02.256.076.045 – adenovirus infections, human
- MeSH C02.256.076.381 – hepatitis, infectious canine

==== MeSH C02.256.430 – hepadnaviridae infections ====
- MeSH C02.256.430.400 – hepatitis b
- MeSH C02.256.430.400.100 – hepatitis b, chronic

==== MeSH C02.256.466 – herpesviridae infections ====
- MeSH C02.256.466.087 – bell palsy
- MeSH C02.256.466.175 – chickenpox
- MeSH C02.256.466.245 – cytomegalovirus infections
- MeSH C02.256.466.245.150 – cytomegalovirus retinitis
- MeSH C02.256.466.262 – encephalitis, herpes simplex
- MeSH C02.256.466.279 – encephalitis, varicella zoster
- MeSH C02.256.466.313 – epstein-barr virus infections
- MeSH C02.256.466.313.165 – burkitt lymphoma
- MeSH C02.256.466.313.400 – infectious mononucleosis
- MeSH C02.256.466.313.500 – leukoplakia, hairy
- MeSH C02.256.466.382 – herpes simplex
- MeSH C02.256.466.382.290 – herpes genitalis
- MeSH C02.256.466.382.316 – herpes labialis
- MeSH C02.256.466.382.410 – kaposi varicelliform eruption
- MeSH C02.256.466.382.465 – keratitis, herpetic
- MeSH C02.256.466.382.465.450 – keratitis, dendritic
- MeSH C02.256.466.382.834 – stomatitis, herpetic
- MeSH C02.256.466.423 – herpes zoster
- MeSH C02.256.466.423.466 – herpes zoster ophthalmicus
- MeSH C02.256.466.423.733 – herpes zoster oticus
- MeSH C02.256.466.423.970 – zoster sine herpete
- MeSH C02.256.466.488 – infectious bovine rhinotracheitis
- MeSH C02.256.466.606 – malignant catarrh
- MeSH C02.256.466.650 – marek disease
- MeSH C02.256.466.793 – pseudorabies
- MeSH C02.256.466.850 – roseolovirus infections
- MeSH C02.256.466.850.290 – exanthema subitum
- MeSH C02.256.466.860 – sarcoma, kaposi

==== MeSH C02.256.650 – papillomavirus infections ====
- MeSH C02.256.650.810 – warts
- MeSH C02.256.650.810.217 – condylomata acuminata
- MeSH C02.256.650.810.345 – epidermodysplasia verruciformis

==== MeSH C02.256.700 – parvoviridae infections ====
- MeSH C02.256.700.091 – aleutian mink disease
- MeSH C02.256.700.300 – erythema infectiosum
- MeSH C02.256.700.363 – feline panleukopenia

==== MeSH C02.256.721 – polyomavirus infections ====
- MeSH C02.256.721.500 – leukoencephalopathy, progressive multifocal

==== MeSH C02.256.743 – poxviridae infections ====
- MeSH C02.256.743.175 – cowpox
- MeSH C02.256.743.193 – ecthyma, contagious
- MeSH C02.256.743.239 – ectromelia, infectious
- MeSH C02.256.743.366 – fowlpox
- MeSH C02.256.743.494 – lumpy skin disease
- MeSH C02.256.743.611 – molluscum contagiosum
- MeSH C02.256.743.615 – monkeypox
- MeSH C02.256.743.665 – myxomatosis, infectious
- MeSH C02.256.743.826 – smallpox
- MeSH C02.256.743.929 – vaccinia

=== MeSH C02.290 – encephalitis, viral ===
==== MeSH C02.290.310 – encephalitis, arbovirus ====
- MeSH C02.290.310.140 – encephalitis, california
- MeSH C02.290.310.280 – encephalitis, japanese
- MeSH C02.290.310.406 – encephalitis, st. louis
- MeSH C02.290.310.530 – encephalitis, tick-borne
- MeSH C02.290.310.950 – west nile fever

==== MeSH C02.290.450 – encephalomyelitis, equine ====
- MeSH C02.290.450.200 – encephalomyelitis, eastern equine
- MeSH C02.290.450.225 – encephalomyelitis, venezuelan equine
- MeSH C02.290.450.250 – encephalomyelitis, western equine

=== MeSH C02.325 – eye infections, viral ===
==== MeSH C02.325.250 – conjunctivitis, viral ====
- MeSH C02.325.250.250 – conjunctivitis, acute hemorrhagic

==== MeSH C02.325.465 – keratitis, herpetic ====
- MeSH C02.325.465.450 – keratitis, dendritic

=== MeSH C02.440 – hepatitis, viral, human ===
==== MeSH C02.440.435 – hepatitis b ====
- MeSH C02.440.435.100 – hepatitis b, chronic

==== MeSH C02.440.440 – hepatitis c ====
- MeSH C02.440.440.120 – hepatitis c, chronic

==== MeSH C02.440.450 – hepatitis d ====
- MeSH C02.440.450.100 – hepatitis d, chronic

=== MeSH C02.782 – rna virus infections ===
==== MeSH C02.782.082 – arenaviridae infections ====
- MeSH C02.782.082.440 – cgi?mode=&term=Hemorrhagic+Fever,+American hemorrhagic fever, american
- MeSH C02.782.082.545 – lassa fever
- MeSH C02.782.082.580 – lymphocytic choriomeningitis

==== MeSH C02.782.147 – bunyaviridae infections ====
- MeSH C02.782.147.340 – encephalitis, california
- MeSH C02.782.147.420 – hantavirus infections
- MeSH C02.782.147.420.380 – hantavirus pulmonary syndrome
- MeSH C02.782.147.420.400 – hemorrhagic fever with renal syndrome
- MeSH C02.782.147.444 – hemorrhagic fever, crimean
- MeSH C02.782.147.633 – nairobi sheep disease
- MeSH C02.782.147.700 – phlebotomus fever
- MeSH C02.782.147.810 – rift valley fever

==== MeSH C02.782.160 – caliciviridae infections ====
- MeSH C02.782.160.927 – vesicular exanthema of swine

==== MeSH C02.782.310 – encephalitis, arbovirus ====
- MeSH C02.782.310.340 – encephalitis, california
- MeSH C02.782.310.345 – encephalitis, japanese
- MeSH C02.782.310.350 – encephalitis, st. louis
- MeSH C02.782.310.360 – encephalitis, tick-borne
- MeSH C02.782.310.950 – west nile fever

==== MeSH C02.782.350 – flaviviridae infections ====
- MeSH C02.782.350.250 – flavivirus infections
- MeSH C02.782.350.250.214 – dengue fever
- MeSH C02.782.350.250.214.200 – dengue hemorrhagic fever
- MeSH C02.782.350.250.300 – encephalitis, japanese
- MeSH C02.782.350.250.450 – encephalitis, st. louis
- MeSH C02.782.350.250.500 – encephalitis, tick-borne
- MeSH C02.782.350.250.560 – hemorrhagic fever, omsk
- MeSH C02.782.350.250.635 – kyasanur forest disease
- MeSH C02.782.350.250.650 – louping ill
- MeSH C02.782.350.250.900 – west nile fever
- MeSH C02.782.350.250.980 – yellow fever
- MeSH C02.782.350.350 – hepatitis c
- MeSH C02.782.350.350.120 – hepatitis c, chronic
- MeSH C02.782.350.675 – pestivirus infections
- MeSH C02.782.350.675.100 – border disease
- MeSH C02.782.350.675.106 – bovine virus diarrhea-mucosal disease
- MeSH C02.782.350.675.200 – classical swine fever
- MeSH C02.782.350.675.400 – hemorrhagic syndrome, bovine

==== MeSH C02.782.417 – hemorrhagic fevers, viral ====
- MeSH C02.782.417.214 – dengue fever
- MeSH C02.782.417.214.200 – dengue hemorrhagic fever
- MeSH C02.782.417.400 – cgi?mode=&term=Hemorrhagic+Fever,+American hemorrhagic fever, american
- MeSH C02.782.417.412 – hemorrhagic fever, crimean
- MeSH C02.782.417.415 – hemorrhagic fever, ebola
- MeSH C02.782.417.435 – hemorrhagic fever, omsk
- MeSH C02.782.417.450 – hemorrhagic fever with renal syndrome
- MeSH C02.782.417.475 – kyasanur forest disease
- MeSH C02.782.417.505 – lassa fever
- MeSH C02.782.417.560 – marburg virus disease
- MeSH C02.782.417.762 – rift valley fever

==== MeSH C02.782.450 – hepatitis d ====
- MeSH C02.782.450.100 – hepatitis d, chronic

==== MeSH C02.782.580 – mononegavirales infections ====
- MeSH C02.782.580.124 – borna disease
- MeSH C02.782.580.250 – filoviridae infections
- MeSH C02.782.580.250.400 – hemorrhagic fever, ebola
- MeSH C02.782.580.250.500 – marburg virus disease
- MeSH C02.782.580.600 – paramyxoviridae infections
- MeSH C02.782.580.600.080 – avulavirus infections
- MeSH C02.782.580.600.080.600 – newcastle disease
- MeSH C02.782.580.600.400 – henipavirus infections
- MeSH C02.782.580.600.500 – morbillivirus infections
- MeSH C02.782.580.600.500.285 – distemper
- MeSH C02.782.580.600.500.500 – measles
- MeSH C02.782.580.600.500.500.800 – subacute sclerosing panencephalitis
- MeSH C02.782.580.600.500.600 – peste-des-petits-ruminants
- MeSH C02.782.580.600.500.700 – rinderpest
- MeSH C02.782.580.600.600 – respirovirus infections
- MeSH C02.782.580.600.600.648 – pasteurellosis, pneumonic
- MeSH C02.782.580.600.620 – pneumovirus infections
- MeSH C02.782.580.600.620.750 – respiratory syncytial virus infections
- MeSH C02.782.580.600.680 – rubulavirus infections
- MeSH C02.782.580.600.680.500 – mumps
- MeSH C02.782.580.830 – rhabdoviridae infections
- MeSH C02.782.580.830.375 – ephemeral fever
- MeSH C02.782.580.830.450 – hemorrhagic septicemia, viral
- MeSH C02.782.580.830.750 – rabies

==== MeSH C02.782.600 – nidovirales infections ====
- MeSH C02.782.600.100 – arterivirus infections
- MeSH C02.782.600.100.700 – porcine reproductive and respiratory syndrome
- MeSH C02.782.600.550 – coronaviridae infections
- MeSH C02.782.600.550.200 – coronavirus infections
- MeSH C02.782.600.550.200.325 – enteritis, transmissible, of turkeys
- MeSH C02.782.600.550.200.360 – feline infectious peritonitis
- MeSH C02.782.600.550.200.400 – gastroenteritis, transmissible, of swine
- MeSH C02.782.600.550.200.750 – severe acute respiratory syndrome
- MeSH C02.782.600.550.800 – torovirus infections

==== MeSH C02.782.620 – orthomyxoviridae infections ====
- MeSH C02.782.620.365 – influenza, human
- MeSH C02.782.620.375 – influenza in birds

==== MeSH C02.782.687 – picornaviridae infections ====
- MeSH C02.782.687.150 – cardiovirus infections
- MeSH C02.782.687.207 – common cold
- MeSH C02.782.687.359 – enterovirus infections
- MeSH C02.782.687.359.201 – conjunctivitis, acute hemorrhagic
- MeSH C02.782.687.359.213 – coxsackievirus infections
- MeSH C02.782.687.359.213.165 – conjunctivitis, acute hemorrhagic
- MeSH C02.782.687.359.213.331 – hand, foot and mouth disease
- MeSH C02.782.687.359.213.466 – herpangina
- MeSH C02.782.687.359.213.737 – pleurodynia, epidemic
- MeSH C02.782.687.359.347 – echovirus infections
- MeSH C02.782.687.359.456 – encephalomyelitis, enzootic porcine
- MeSH C02.782.687.359.500 – hepatitis a
- MeSH C02.782.687.359.764 – poliomyelitis
- MeSH C02.782.687.359.764.614 – poliomyelitis, bulbar
- MeSH C02.782.687.359.764.650 – postpoliomyelitis syndrome
- MeSH C02.782.687.359.855 – swine vesicular disease
- MeSH C02.782.687.484 – foot-and-mouth disease

==== MeSH C02.782.791 – reoviridae infections ====
- MeSH C02.782.791.142 – african horse sickness
- MeSH C02.782.791.315 – bluetongue
- MeSH C02.782.791.482 – colorado tick fever
- MeSH C02.782.791.814 – rotavirus infections

==== MeSH C02.782.815 – retroviridae infections ====
- MeSH C02.782.815.096 – avian leukosis
- MeSH C02.782.815.200 – deltaretrovirus infections
- MeSH C02.782.815.200.260 – enzootic bovine leukosis
- MeSH C02.782.815.200.470 – htlv-i infections
- MeSH C02.782.815.200.470.300 – leukemia-lymphoma, t-cell, acute, htlv-i-associated
- MeSH C02.782.815.200.470.710 – paraparesis, tropical spastic
- MeSH C02.782.815.200.480 – htlv-ii infections
- MeSH C02.782.815.200.480.350 – leukemia, t-cell, htlv-ii-associated
- MeSH C02.782.815.616 – lentivirus infections
- MeSH C02.782.815.616.300 – equine infectious anemia
- MeSH C02.782.815.616.350 – feline acquired immunodeficiency syndrome
- MeSH C02.782.815.616.400 – hiv infections
- MeSH C02.782.815.616.400.040 – acquired immunodeficiency syndrome
- MeSH C02.782.815.616.400.048 – aids arteritis, central nervous system
- MeSH C02.782.815.616.400.050 – aids-associated nephropathy
- MeSH C02.782.815.616.400.070 – aids dementia complex
- MeSH C02.782.815.616.400.080 – aids-related complex
- MeSH C02.782.815.616.400.100 – aids-related opportunistic infections
- MeSH C02.782.815.616.400.400 – hiv-associated lipodystrophy syndrome
- MeSH C02.782.815.616.400.480 – hiv enteropathy
- MeSH C02.782.815.616.400.500 – hiv seropositivity
- MeSH C02.782.815.616.400.520 – hiv wasting syndrome
- MeSH C02.782.815.616.660 – pneumonia, progressive interstitial, of sheep
- MeSH C02.782.815.616.850 – simian acquired immunodeficiency syndrome
- MeSH C02.782.815.616.900 – visna
- MeSH C02.782.815.622 – leukemia, feline
- MeSH C02.782.815.650 – murine acquired immunodeficiency syndrome
- MeSH C02.782.815.725 – pulmonary adenomatosis, ovine
- MeSH C02.782.815.800 – sarcoma, avian

==== MeSH C02.782.930 – togaviridae infections ====
- MeSH C02.782.930.100 – alphavirus infections
- MeSH C02.782.930.100.370 – encephalomyelitis, equine
- MeSH C02.782.930.100.370.162 – encephalomyelitis, eastern equine
- MeSH C02.782.930.100.370.325 – encephalomyelitis, venezuelan equine
- MeSH C02.782.930.100.370.662 – encephalomyelitis, western equine
- MeSH C02.782.930.700 – rubivirus infections
- MeSH C02.782.930.700.700 – rubella
- MeSH C02.782.930.700.700.700 – rubella syndrome, congenital

=== MeSH C02.800 – sexually transmitted diseases ===
==== MeSH C02.800.801 – sexually transmitted diseases, viral ====
- MeSH C02.800.801.220 – condylomata acuminata
- MeSH C02.800.801.350 – herpes genitalis
- MeSH C02.800.801.400 – hiv infections
- MeSH C02.800.801.400.040 – acquired immunodeficiency syndrome
- MeSH C02.800.801.400.048 – aids arteritis, central nervous system
- MeSH C02.800.801.400.050 – aids-associated nephropathy
- MeSH C02.800.801.400.070 – aids dementia complex
- MeSH C02.800.801.400.080 – aids-related complex
- MeSH C02.800.801.400.400 – hiv-associated lipodystrophy syndrome
- MeSH C02.800.801.400.480 – hiv enteropathy
- MeSH C02.800.801.400.500 – hiv seropositivity
- MeSH C02.800.801.400.520 – hiv wasting syndrome

=== MeSH C02.825 – skin diseases, viral ===
==== MeSH C02.825.320 – herpes simplex ====
- MeSH C02.825.320.320 – herpes labialis
- MeSH C02.825.320.410 – kaposi varicelliform eruption

==== MeSH C02.825.810 – warts ====
- MeSH C02.825.810.110 – condylomata acuminata
- MeSH C02.825.810.260 – epidermodysplasia verruciformis

=== MeSH C02.928 – tumor virus infections ===
==== MeSH C02.928.313 – epstein-barr virus infections ====
- MeSH C02.928.313.165 – burkitt lymphoma

==== MeSH C02.928.914 – warts ====
- MeSH C02.928.914.217 – condylomata acuminata
- MeSH C02.928.914.345 – epidermodysplasia verruciformis

== Updated list ==
- Virus Diseases (C01.925, D014777)
  - Arbovirus (C01.925.081, D001102)
    - African Horse Sickness (C01.925.081.030, D000355)
    - African Swine Fever (C01.925.081.078, D000357)
    - Bluetongue (C01.925.081.125, D001819)
    - Chikungunya Fever (C01.925.081.198, D065632)
    - Colorado Tick Fever (C01.925.081.234, D003121)
    - Dengue (C01.925.081.270, D003715)
      - Severe Dengue (C01.925.081.270.200, D019595)
    - Encephalitis, Arbovirus (C01.925.081.343, D004671)
      - Encephalitis, California (C01.925.081.343.340, D004670)
      - Encephalitis, Japanese (C01.925.081.343.345, D004672)
      - Encephalitis, St. Louis (C01.925.081.343.350, D004674)
      - Encephalitis, Tick-Borne (C01.925.081.343.360, D004675)
      - Encephalomyelitis, Equine (C01.925.081.343.655, D004683)
        - Encephalomyelitis, Eastern Equine (C01.925.081.343.655.177, D020242)
        - Encephalomyelitis, Venezuelan Equine (C01.925.081.343.655.355, D004685)
        - Encephalomyelitis, Western Equine (C01.925.081.343.655.677, D020241)
      - West Nile Fever (C01.925.081.343.950, D014901)
    - Hemorrhagic Fever, Crimean (C01.925.081.522, D006479)
    - Hemorrhagic Fever, Omsk (C01.925.081.611, D006481)
    - Kyasanur Forest Disease (C01.925.081.656, D007733)
    - Nairobi Sheep Disease (C01.925.081.678, D009265)
    - Phlebotomus Fever (C01.925.081.700, D010217)
    - Rift Valley Fever (C01.925.081.810, D012295)
    - Ross River Virus Infection (C01.925.081.895, D000096745)
    - Yellow Fever (C01.925.081.980, D015004)
    - Zika Virus Infection (C01.925.081.990, D000071243)
  - Bronchiolitis, Viral (C01.925.109, D001990)
  - Central Nervous System Viral Diseases (C01.925.182, D020805)
    - Encephalitis, Viral (C01.925.182.525, D018792)
      - Encephalitis, Arbovirus (C01.925.182.525.300, D004671)
        - Encephalitis, California (C01.925.182.525.300.200, D004670)
        - Encephalitis, Japanese (C01.925.182.525.300.250, D004672)
        - Encephalitis, St. Louis (C01.925.182.525.300.300, D004674)
        - Encephalitis, Tick-Borne (C01.925.182.525.300.350, D004675)
        - West Nile Fever (C01.925.182.525.300.850, D014901)
      - Encephalitis, Herpes Simplex (C01.925.182.525.350, D020803)
      - Encephalitis, Varicella Zoster (C01.925.182.525.400, D020804)
      - Encephalomyelitis, Equine (C01.925.182.525.450, D004683)
        - Encephalomyelitis, Venezuelan Equine (C01.925.182.525.450.250, D004685)
        - Encephalomyelitis, Western Equine (C01.925.182.525.450.300, D020241)
      - Leukoencephalopathy, Progressive Multifocal (C01.925.182.525.500, D007968)
      - Subacute Sclerosing Panencephalitis (C01.925.182.525.600, D013344)
    - Meningitis, Viral (C01.925.182.550, D008587)
      - Lymphocytic Choriomeningitis (C01.925.182.550.500, D008216)
    - Pseudorabies (C01.925.182.710, D011557)
  - DNA Virus Infections (C01.925.256, D004266)
    - Adenoviridae Infections (C01.925.256.076, D000257)
      - Adenovirus Infections, Human (C01.925.256.076.045, D000258)
      - Hepatitis, Infectious Canine (C01.925.256.076.381, D006522)
    - African Swine Fever (C01.925.256.142, D000357)
    - Circoviridae Infections (C01.925.256.200, D018173)
      - Porcine Postweaning Multisystemic Wasting Syndrome (C01.925.256.200.500, D053570)
    - Hepadnaviridae Infections (C01.925.256.430, D018347)
      - Hepatitis B (C01.925.256.430.400, D006509)
        - Hepatitis B, Chronic (C01.925.256.430.400.100, D019694)
    - Herpesviridae Infections (C01.925.256.466, D006566)
      - Bell Palsy (C01.925.256.466.087, D020330)
      - Cytomegalovirus Infections (C01.925.256.466.245, D003586)
        - Cytomegalovirus Retinitis (C01.925.256.466.245.150, D017726)
      - Encephalitis, Herpes Simplex (C01.925.256.466.262, D020803)
      - Epstein-Barr Virus Infections (C01.925.256.466.313, D020031)
        - Burkitt Lymphoma (C01.925.256.466.313.165, D002051)
        - Infectious Mononucleosis (C01.925.256.466.313.400, D007244)
        - Leukoplakia, Hairy (C01.925.256.466.313.500, D017733)
      - Herpes Simplex (C01.925.256.466.382, D006561)
        - Herpes Genitalis (C01.925.256.466.382.290, D006558)
        - Herpes Labialis (C01.925.256.466.382.316, D006560)
        - Kaposi Varicelliform Eruption (C01.925.256.466.382.410, D007617)
        - Keratitis, Herpetic (C01.925.256.466.382.465, D016849)
          - Keratitis, Dendritic (C01.925.256.466.382.465.450, D007635)
        - Stomatitis, Herpetic (C01.925.256.466.382.834, D013283)
      - Infectious Bovine Rhinotracheitis (C01.925.256.466.488, D007241)
      - Malignant Catarrh (C01.925.256.466.606, D008304)
      - Marek Disease (C01.925.256.466.650, D008380)
      - Pseudorabies (C01.925.256.466.793, D011557)
      - Roseolovirus Infections (C01.925.256.466.850, D019349)
        - Exanthema Subitum (C01.925.256.466.850.290, D005077)
      - Sarcoma, Kaposi (C01.925.256.466.860, D012514)
      - Varicella Zoster Virus Infection (C01.925.256.466.930, D000073618)
        - Chickenpox (C01.925.256.466.930.250, D002644)
        - Encephalitis, Varicella Zoster (C01.925.256.466.930.500, D020804)
        - Herpes Zoster (C01.925.256.466.930.750, D006562)
          - Herpes Zoster Ophthalmicus (C01.925.256.466.930.750.466, D006563)
          - Herpes Zoster Oticus (C01.925.256.466.930.750.733, D016697)
          - Zoster Sine Herpete (C01.925.256.466.930.750.970, D031368)
    - Papillomavirus Infections (C01.925.256.650, D030361)
      - Condylomata Acuminata (C01.925.256.650.405, D003218)
        - Buschke-Lowenstein Tumor (C01.925.256.650.405.500, D062688)
      - Warts (C01.925.256.650.810, D014860)
        - Epidermodysplasia Verruciformis (C01.925.256.650.810.345, D004819)
    - Parvoviridae Infections (C01.925.256.700, D010322)
      - Aleutian Mink Disease (C01.925.256.700.091, D000453)
      - Erythema Infectiosum (C01.925.256.700.300, D016731)
      - Feline Panleukopenia (C01.925.256.700.363, D005254)
      - Mink Viral Enteritis (C01.925.256.700.550, D053489)
    - Polyomavirus Infections (C01.925.256.721, D027601)
      - Carcinoma, Merkel Cell (C01.925.256.721.150, D015266)
      - Leukoencephalopathy, Progressive Multifocal (C01.925.256.721.500, D007968)
    - Poxviridae Infections (C01.925.256.743, D011213)
      - Cowpox (C01.925.256.743.175, D015605)
      - Ecthyma, Contagious (C01.925.256.743.193, D004474)
      - Ectromelia, Infectious (C01.925.256.743.239, D004482)
      - Fowlpox (C01.925.256.743.366, D005586)
      - Lumpy Skin Disease (C01.925.256.743.494, D008166)
      - Molluscum Contagiosum (C01.925.256.743.611, D008976)
      - Mpox, Monkeypox (C01.925.256.743.615, D045908)
      - Myxomatosis, Infectious (C01.925.256.743.665, D009234)
      - Smallpox (C01.925.256.743.826, D012899)
      - Vaccinia (C01.925.256.743.929, D014615)
  - Eye Infections, Viral (C01.925.325, D015828)
    - Conjunctivitis, Viral (C01.925.325.250, D003236)
      - Conjunctivitis, Acute Hemorrhagic (C01.925.325.250.250, D003232)
    - Cytomegalovirus Retinitis (C01.925.325.270, D017726)
    - Herpes Zoster Ophthalmicus (C01.925.325.450, D006563)
    - Keratitis, Herpetic (C01.925.325.465, D016849)
      - Keratitis, Dendritic (C01.925.325.465.450, D007635)
  - Hepatitis, Viral, Animal (C01.925.407, D006524)
    - Hepatitis, Infectious Canine (C01.925.407.432, D006522)
    - Rift Valley Fever (C01.925.407.810, D012295)
  - Hepatitis, Viral, Human (C01.925.440, D006525)
    - Hepatitis A (C01.925.440.420, D006506)
    - Hepatitis B (C01.925.440.435, D006509)
      - Hepatitis B, Chronic (C01.925.440.435.100, D019694)
    - Hepatitis C (C01.925.440.440, D006526)
      - Hepatitis C, Chronic (C01.925.440.440.120, D019698)
    - Hepatitis D (C01.925.440.450, D003699)
      - Hepatitis D, Chronic (C01.925.440.450.100, D019701)
    - Hepatitis E (C01.925.440.470, D016751)
  - Pneumonia, Viral (C01.925.705, D011024)
    - COVID-19 (C01.925.705.500, D000086382)
      - Post-Acute COVID-19 Syndrome (C01.925.705.500.500, D000094024)
  - Reticuloendotheliosis, Avian (C01.925.744, D055761)
  - RNA Virus Infections (C01.925.782, D012327)
    - Arenaviridae Infections (C01.925.782.082, D001117)
      - Hemorrhagic Fever, American (C01.925.782.082.440, D006478)
      - Lassa Fever (C01.925.782.082.545, D007835)
      - Lymphocytic Choriomeningitis (C01.925.782.082.580, D008216)
    - Astroviridae Infections (C01.925.782.105, D019350)
    - Birnaviridae Infections (C01.925.782.123, D018175)
    - Bunyaviridae Infections (C01.925.782.147, D002044)
      - Encephalitis, California (C01.925.782.147.340, D004670)
      - Hantavirus Infections (C01.925.782.147.420, D018778)
        - Hantavirus Pulmonary Syndrome (C01.925.782.147.420.380, D018804)
        - Hemorrhagic Fever with Renal Syndrome (C01.925.782.147.420.400, D006480)
      - Hemorrhagic Fever, Crimean (C01.925.782.147.444, D006479)
      - Nairobi Sheep Disease (C01.925.782.147.633, D009265)
      - Phlebotomus Fever (C01.925.782.147.700, D010217)
      - Rift Valley Fever (C01.925.782.147.810, D012295)
      - Severe Fever with Thrombocytopenia Syndrome (C01.925.782.147.905, D000085142)
    - Caliciviridae Infections (C01.925.782.160, D017250)
      - Vesicular Exanthema of Swine (C01.925.782.160.927, D014720)
    - Encephalitis, Arbovirus (C01.925.782.310, D004671)
      - Encephalitis, California (C01.925.782.310.340, D004670)
      - Encephalitis, Japanese (C01.925.782.310.345, D004672)
      - Encephalitis, St. Louis (C01.925.782.310.350, D004674)
      - Encephalitis, Tick-Borne (C01.925.782.310.360, D004675)
      - West Nile Fever (C01.925.782.310.950, D014901)
    - Flaviviridae Infections (C01.925.782.350, D018178)
      - Flavivirus Infections (C01.925.782.350.250, D018177)
        - Dengue (C01.925.782.350.250.214, D003715)
          - Severe Dengue (C01.925.782.350.250.214.200, D019595)
        - Encephalitis, Japanese (C01.925.782.350.250.300, D004672)
        - Encephalitis, St. Louis (C01.925.782.350.250.450, D004674)
        - Encephalitis, Tick-Borne (C01.925.782.350.250.500, D004675)
        - Hemorrhagic Fever, Omsk (C01.925.782.350.250.560, D006481)
        - Kyasanur Forest Disease (C01.925.782.350.250.635, D007733)
        - Louping Ill (C01.925.782.350.250.650, D008146)
        - West Nile Fever (C01.925.782.350.250.900, D014901)
        - Yellow Fever (C01.925.782.350.250.980, D015004)
        - Zika Virus Infection (C01.925.782.350.250.990, D000071243)
      - Hepatitis C (C01.925.782.350.350, D006526)
        - Hepatitis C, Chronic (C01.925.782.350.350.120, D019698)
      - Pestivirus Infections (C01.925.782.350.675, D018182)
        - Border Disease (C01.925.782.350.675.100, D001882)
        - Bovine Virus Diarrhea-Mucosal Disease (C01.925.782.350.675.106, D001912)
        - Classical Swine Fever (C01.925.782.350.675.200, D006691)
        - Hemorrhagic Syndrome, Bovine (C01.925.782.350.675.400, D030243)
    - Hemorrhagic Fevers, Viral (C01.925.782.417, D006482)
      - Dengue (C01.925.782.417.214, D003715)
        - Severe Dengue (C01.925.782.417.214.200, D019595)
      - Hemorrhagic Fever with Renal Syndrome (C01.925.782.417.300, D006480)
      - Hemorrhagic Fever, American (C01.925.782.417.400, D006478)
      - Hemorrhagic Fever, Crimean (C01.925.782.417.412, D006479)
      - Hemorrhagic Fever, Ebola (C01.925.782.417.415, D019142)
      - Hemorrhagic Fever, Omsk (C01.925.782.417.435, D006481)
      - Kyasanur Forest Disease (C01.925.782.417.475, D007733)
      - Lassa Fever (C01.925.782.417.505, D007835)
      - Marburg Virus Disease (C01.925.782.417.560, D008379)
      - Rift Valley Fever (C01.925.782.417.762, D012295)
      - Yellow Fever (C01.925.782.417.881, D015004)
    - Hepatitis D (C01.925.782.450, D003699)
      - Hepatitis D, Chronic (C01.925.782.450.100, D019701)
    - Hepatitis E (C01.925.782.455, D016751)
    - Mononegavirales Infections (C01.925.782.580, D018701)
      - Borna Disease (C01.925.782.580.124, D001890)
      - Filoviridae Infections (C01.925.782.580.250, D018702)
        - Hemorrhagic Fever, Ebola (C01.925.782.580.250.400, D019142)
        - Marburg Virus Disease (C01.925.782.580.250.500, D008379)
      - Paramyxoviridae Infections (C01.925.782.580.600, D018184)
        - Avulavirus Infections (C01.925.782.580.600.080, D045463)
          - Newcastle Disease (C01.925.782.580.600.080.600, D009521)
        - Henipavirus Infections (C01.925.782.580.600.400, D045464)
        - Morbillivirus Infections (C01.925.782.580.600.500, D018185)
          - Distemper (C01.925.782.580.600.500.285, D004216)
          - Measles (C01.925.782.580.600.500.500, D008457)
            - Subacute Sclerosing Panencephalitis (C01.925.782.580.600.500.500.800, D013344)
          - Peste-des-Petits-Ruminants (C01.925.782.580.600.500.600, D029021)
          - Rinderpest (C01.925.782.580.600.500.700, D012301)
        - Pneumovirus Infections (C01.925.782.580.600.550, D018186)
          - Respiratory Syncytial Virus Infections (C01.925.782.580.600.550.750, D018357)
        - Respirovirus Infections (C01.925.782.580.600.600, D010253)
          - Pasteurellosis, Pneumonic (C01.925.782.580.600.600.648, D012766)
        - Rubulavirus Infections (C01.925.782.580.600.680, D019351)
          - Mumps (C01.925.782.580.600.680.500, D009107)
      - Rhabdoviridae Infections (C01.925.782.580.830, D018353)
        - Ephemeral Fever (C01.925.782.580.830.375, D004810)
        - Hemorrhagic Septicemia, Viral (C01.925.782.580.830.450, D031941)
        - Rabies (C01.925.782.580.830.750, D011818)
        - Vesicular Stomatitis (C01.925.782.580.830.825, D054243)
    - Nidovirales Infections (C01.925.782.600, D030341)
      - Arterivirus Infections (C01.925.782.600.100, D018174)
        - Porcine Reproductive and Respiratory Syndrome (C01.925.782.600.100.700, D019318)
      - Coronaviridae Infections (C01.925.782.600.550, D003333)
        - Coronavirus Infections (C01.925.782.600.550.200, D018352)
          - COVID-19 (C01.925.782.600.550.200.163, D000086382)
            - Post-Acute COVID-19 Syndrome (C01.925.782.600.550.200.163.500, D000094024)
          - Enteritis, Transmissible, of Turkeys (C01.925.782.600.550.200.325, D004753)
          - Feline Infectious Peritonitis (C01.925.782.600.550.200.360, D016766)
          - Gastroenteritis, Transmissible, of Swine (C01.925.782.600.550.200.400, D005761)
          - Severe Acute Respiratory Syndrome (C01.925.782.600.550.200.750, D045169)
        - Torovirus Infections (C01.925.782.600.550.800, D018176)
    - Orthomyxoviridae Infections (C01.925.782.620, D009976)
      - Influenza in Birds (C01.925.782.620.300, D005585)
      - Influenza, Human (C01.925.782.620.365, D007251)
    - Picornaviridae Infections (C01.925.782.687, D010850)
      - Cardiovirus Infections (C01.925.782.687.150, D018188)
      - Common Cold (C01.925.782.687.207, D003139)
      - Enterovirus Infections (C01.925.782.687.359, D004769)
        - Conjunctivitis, Acute Hemorrhagic (C01.925.782.687.359.201, D003232)
        - Coxsackievirus Infections (C01.925.782.687.359.213, D003384)
          - Hand, Foot and Mouth Disease (C01.925.782.687.359.213.331, D006232)
          - Herpangina (C01.925.782.687.359.213.466, D006557)
          - Pleurodynia, Epidemic (C01.925.782.687.359.213.737, D011000)
        - Echovirus Infections (C01.925.782.687.359.347, D004457)
          - Herpangina (C01.925.782.687.359.347.500, D006557)
        - Encephalomyelitis, Enzootic Porcine (C01.925.782.687.359.456, D004682)
        - Hepatitis A (C01.925.782.687.359.500, D006506)
        - Poliomyelitis (C01.925.782.687.359.764, D011051)
          - Poliomyelitis, Bulbar (C01.925.782.687.359.764.614, D011052)
          - Postpoliomyelitis Syndrome (C01.925.782.687.359.764.650, D016262)
        - Swine Vesicular Disease (C01.925.782.687.359.855, D013555)
      - Foot-and-Mouth Disease (C01.925.782.687.484, D005536)
    - Reoviridae Infections (C01.925.782.791, D012088)
      - African Horse Sickness (C01.925.782.791.142, D000355)
      - Bluetongue (C01.925.782.791.315, D001819)
      - Colorado Tick Fever (C01.925.782.791.482, D003121)
      - Rotavirus Infections (C01.925.782.791.814, D012400)
    - Retroviridae Infections (C01.925.782.815, D012192)
      - Avian Leukosis (C01.925.782.815.096, D001353)
      - Deltaretrovirus Infections (C01.925.782.815.200, D006800)
        - Enzootic Bovine Leukosis (C01.925.782.815.200.260, D016583)
        - HTLV-I Infections (C01.925.782.815.200.470, D015490)
          - Paraparesis, Tropical Spastic (C01.925.782.815.200.470.710, D015493)
        - HTLV-II Infections (C01.925.782.815.200.480, D015491)
      - Lentivirus Infections (C01.925.782.815.616, D016180)
        - Equine Infectious Anemia (C01.925.782.815.616.300, D004859)
        - Feline Acquired Immunodeficiency Syndrome (C01.925.782.815.616.350, D016181)
        - HIV Infections (C01.925.782.815.616.400, D015658)
          - Acquired Immunodeficiency Syndrome (C01.925.782.815.616.400.040, D000163)
          - Acute Retroviral Syndrome (C01.925.782.815.616.400.044, D000071297)
          - AIDS Arteritis, Central Nervous System (C01.925.782.815.616.400.048, D020943)
          - AIDS Dementia Complex (C01.925.782.815.616.400.049, D015526)
          - AIDS-Associated Nephropathy (C01.925.782.815.616.400.050, D016263)
          - AIDS-Related Complex (C01.925.782.815.616.400.080, D000386)
          - Opportunistic Infection (C01.925.782.815.616.400.100, D017088)
          - HIV Enteropathy (C01.925.782.815.616.400.398, D019053)
          - HIV Seropositivity (C01.925.782.815.616.400.500, D006679)
          - HIV Wasting Syndrome (C01.925.782.815.616.400.520, D019247)
          - HIV-Associated Lipodystrophy Syndrome (C01.925.782.815.616.400.550, D039682)
        - Pneumonia, Progressive Interstitial, of Sheep (C01.925.782.815.616.660, D011021)
        - Simian Acquired Immunodeficiency Syndrome (C01.925.782.815.616.850, D016097)
        - Visna (C01.925.782.815.616.900, D016182)
      - Leukemia, Feline (C01.925.782.815.622, D016582)
      - Murine Acquired Immunodeficiency Syndrome (C01.925.782.815.650, D016183)
      - Pulmonary Adenomatosis, Ovine (C01.925.782.815.725, D011648)
      - Sarcoma, Avian (C01.925.782.815.800, D001357)
    - Togaviridae Infections (C01.925.782.930, D014036)
      - Alphavirus Infections (C01.925.782.930.100, D018354)
        - Chikungunya Fever (C01.925.782.930.100.184, D065632)
        - Encephalomyelitis, Equine (C01.925.782.930.100.370, D004683)
          - Encephalomyelitis, Eastern Equine (C01.925.782.930.100.370.162, D020242)
          - Encephalomyelitis, Venezuelan Equine (C01.925.782.930.100.370.325, D004685)
          - Encephalomyelitis, Western Equine (C01.925.782.930.100.370.662, D020241)
        - Ross River Virus Infection (C01.925.782.930.100.685, D000096745)
      - Rubivirus Infections (C01.925.782.930.700, D018355)
        - Rubella (C01.925.782.930.700.700, D012409)
          - Rubella Syndrome, Congenital (C01.925.782.930.700.700.700, D012410)
  - Sexually Transmitted Diseases, Viral (C01.925.813, D015229)
    - Condylomata Acuminata (C01.925.813.220, D003218)
      - Buschke-Lowenstein Tumor (C01.925.813.220.500, D062688)
    - Herpes Genitalis (C01.925.813.350, D006558)
    - HIV Infections (C01.925.813.400, D015658)
      - Acquired Immunodeficiency Syndrome (C01.925.813.400.040, D000163)
      - Acute Retroviral Syndrome (C01.925.813.400.044, D000071297)
      - AIDS Arteritis, Central Nervous System (C01.925.813.400.048, D020943)
      - AIDS Dementia Complex (C01.925.813.400.070, D015526)
      - AIDS-Associated Nephropathy (C01.925.813.400.072, D016263)
      - AIDS-Related Complex (C01.925.813.400.080, D000386)
      - HIV Enteropathy (C01.925.813.400.480, D019053)
      - HIV Seropositivity (C01.925.813.400.500, D006679)
      - HIV Wasting Syndrome (C01.925.813.400.520, D019247)
      - HIV-Associated Lipodystrophy Syndrome (C01.925.813.400.530, D039682)
    - Papillomavirus Infections (C01.925.813.700, D030361)
      - Condylomata Acuminata (C01.925.813.700.500, D003218)
  - Skin Diseases, Viral (C01.925.825, D017193)
    - Erythema Infectiosum (C01.925.825.260, D016731)
    - Exanthema Subitum (C01.925.825.290, D005077)
    - Herpes Simplex (C01.925.825.320, D006561)
      - Herpes Labialis (C01.925.825.320.320, D006560)
      - Kaposi Varicelliform Eruption (C01.925.825.320.410, D007617)
    - Molluscum Contagiosum (C01.925.825.550, D008976)
    - Warts (C01.925.825.810, D014860)
      - Condylomata Acuminata (C01.925.825.810.110, D003218)
        - Buschke-Lowenstein Tumor (C01.925.825.810.110.500, D062688)
      - Epidermodysplasia Verruciformis (C01.925.825.810.260, D004819)
  - Slow Virus Diseases (C01.925.839, D012897)
    - Acquired Immunodeficiency Syndrome (C01.925.839.040, D000163)
    - AIDS-Related Complex (C01.925.839.080, D000386)
    - Aleutian Mink Disease (C01.925.839.091, D000453)
    - Equine Infectious Anemia (C01.925.839.375, D004859)
    - Feline Acquired Immunodeficiency Syndrome (C01.925.839.400, D016181)
    - Leukoencephalopathy, Progressive Multifocal (C01.925.839.550, D007968)
    - Pneumonia, Progressive Interstitial, of Sheep (C01.925.839.660, D011021)
    - Simian Acquired Immunodeficiency Syndrome (C01.925.839.850, D016097)
    - Subacute Sclerosing Panencephalitis (C01.925.839.862, D013344)
    - Visna (C01.925.839.900, D016182)
  - Tumor Virus Infections (C01.925.928, D014412)
    - Avian Leukosis (C01.925.928.120, D001353)
    - Carcinoma, Merkel Cell (C01.925.928.216, D015266)
    - Epstein-Barr Virus Infections (C01.925.928.313, D020031)
      - Burkitt Lymphoma (C01.925.928.313.165, D002051)
    - Marek Disease (C01.925.928.489, D008380)
    - Murine Acquired Immunodeficiency Syndrome (C01.925.928.650, D016183)
    - Papillomavirus Infections (C01.925.928.725, D030361)
      - Condylomata Acuminata (C01.925.928.725.500, D003218)
        - Buschke-Lowenstein Tumor (C01.925.928.725.500.500, D062688)
    - Pulmonary Adenomatosis, Ovine (C01.925.928.740, D011648)
    - Sarcoma, Avian (C01.925.928.800, D001357)
    - Warts (C01.925.928.914, D014860)
      - Condylomata Acuminata (C01.925.928.914.217, D003218)
        - Buschke-Lowenstein Tumor (C01.925.928.914.217.500, D062688)
      - Epidermodysplasia Verruciformis (C01.925.928.914.345, D004819)
  - Viral Zoonoses (C01.925.933, D000086965)
  - Viremia (C01.925.937, D014766)

The list continues at List of MeSH codes (C03).
