= Keldur Institute =

Research centre in Iceland

Keldur – Institute for Experimental Pathology, University of Iceland is a university institution at Keldur near Reykjavik. It is connected to the Faculty of Medicine but has its own board and independent finances. The operations at Keldur are very diverse. Many scientific methods are used in basic research and services, for example pathology, microbiology, immunology, parasitology, biochemistry and molecular biology.

== History and function ==
The Institute at Keldur was established in the autumn of 1948. It is under the supervision of the Ministry of Education and Culture. The first director of Keldur was Björn Sigurðsson, physician.

The Rockefeller Foundation provided financial support to build and equip the Institute at Keldur but its original role was to respond to an epidemic in sheep, the Maedi Visna Virus, that resulted from contact with Karakul sheep that had been imported into the country in 1933. The official date for the opening of The Institute at Keldur is November 15, 1948. The primary function of the institute is first and foremost to research veterinary diseases.

On the Board of Directors at Keldur are representatives from the Faculty of Medicine, the Faculty of Natural Sciences, the Ministry of Agriculture and Keldur staff members. Keldur has a workforce of 60 employees, on average. Keldur collaborates with many research teams both domestically and internationally. The research projects are funded with Icelandic and international grants.

The director of Keldur is Sigurður Ingvarsson (born 1956). Previous directors of Keldur are Björn Sigurðsson (born 1913, died 1959), Páll Agnar Pálsson (born 1919, died 2003), Guðmundur Georgsson, (born 1932, died 2010), Guðmundur Pétursson (born 1933).
