= West Nile =

West Nile may refer to:

- West Nile fever, a disease caused by the West Nile virus
- West Nile sub-region, Uganda
- West Nile virus, a virus that causes West Nile fever
