= Björn Sigurðsson =

Icelandic scientist

Dr. Björn Sigurðsson (1913–1959) was the first director of Keldur - the Institute for Experimental Pathology, University of Iceland. Björn died at an early age while having been the director of Keldur for only about ten years. In his short life, he made many developments in research in the fields of pathology, bacteriology, virology, immunology and epidemiology.

Björn became a world-renowned scientist because of his research on infectious diseases caused by slow viruses. This group of viruses was given the name, Lentivirus, in honor of the work of Björn Sigurðsson.

The slow virus concept was first introduced by Björn Sigurðsson and he and his co-workers made pioneering studies on slow diseases in sheep including mæði, visna and scrapie. Mæði is a slowly progressive interstitial pneumonia of adult sheep while visna is a slow, progressive encephalomyelitis and the same virus, belonging, to the lentivirus subgroup of retroviruses, was found to be responsible for both conditions.
