= List of MeSH codes (C03) =

The following is a partial list of the "C" codes for Medical Subject Headings (MeSH), as defined by the United States National Library of Medicine (NLM).

This list continues the information at List of MeSH codes (C02). Codes following these are found at List of MeSH codes (C04). For other MeSH codes, see List of MeSH codes.

The source for this content is the set of 2006 MeSH Trees from the NLM.

== MeSH C03 – parasitic diseases ==
=== MeSH C03.105 – central nervous system parasitic infections ===
==== MeSH C03.105.250 – central nervous system helminthiasis ====
- MeSH C03.105.250.550 – neurocysticercosis
- MeSH C03.105.250.600 – neuroschistosomiasis

==== MeSH C03.105.300 – central nervous system protozoal infections ====
- MeSH C03.105.300.500 – malaria, cerebral
- MeSH C03.105.300.800 – toxoplasmosis, cerebral

=== MeSH C03.335 – helminthiasis ===
==== MeSH C03.335.190 – cestode infections ====
- MeSH C03.335.190.304 – diphyllobothriasis
- MeSH C03.335.190.304.780 – sparganosis
- MeSH C03.335.190.396 – echinococcosis
- MeSH C03.335.190.396.314 – echinococcosis, hepatic
- MeSH C03.335.190.396.480 – echinococcosis, pulmonary
- MeSH C03.335.190.519 – hymenolepiasis
- MeSH C03.335.190.628 – monieziasis
- MeSH C03.335.190.902 – taeniasis
- MeSH C03.335.190.902.185 – cysticercosis
- MeSH C03.335.190.902.185.550 – neurocysticercosis

==== MeSH C03.335.349 – helminthiasis, animal ====
- MeSH C03.335.349.315 – dictyocaulus infections
- MeSH C03.335.349.320 – dirofilariasis
- MeSH C03.335.349.444 – fascioloidiasis
- MeSH C03.335.349.656 – monieziasis
- MeSH C03.335.349.820 – setariasis
- MeSH C03.335.349.840 – strongyle infections, equine
- MeSH C03.335.349.868 – toxocariasis

==== MeSH C03.335.508 – nematode infections ====
- MeSH C03.335.508.100 – adenophorea infections
- MeSH C03.335.508.100.275 – enoplida infections
- MeSH C03.335.508.100.275.882 – trichinosis
- MeSH C03.335.508.100.275.895 – trichuriasis
- MeSH C03.335.508.523 – larva migrans
- MeSH C03.335.508.523.780 – larva migrans, visceral
- MeSH C03.335.508.700 – secernentea infections
- MeSH C03.335.508.700.100 – ascaridida infections
- MeSH C03.335.508.700.100.060 – anisakiasis
- MeSH C03.335.508.700.100.070 – ascariasis
- MeSH C03.335.508.700.100.080 – ascaridiasis
- MeSH C03.335.508.700.100.850 – toxascariasis
- MeSH C03.335.508.700.100.868 – toxocariasis
- MeSH C03.335.508.700.100.868.420 – larva migrans, visceral
- MeSH C03.335.508.700.550 – oxyurida infections
- MeSH C03.335.508.700.550.550 – oxyuriasis
- MeSH C03.335.508.700.550.550.375 – enterobiasis
- MeSH C03.335.508.700.700 – rhabditida infections
- MeSH C03.335.508.700.700.799 – strongyloidiasis
- MeSH C03.335.508.700.750 – spirurida infections
- MeSH C03.335.508.700.750.299 – dracunculiasis
- MeSH C03.335.508.700.750.361 – filariasis
- MeSH C03.335.508.700.750.361.275 – dipetalonema infections
- MeSH C03.335.508.700.750.361.290 – dirofilariasis
- MeSH C03.335.508.700.750.361.350 – elephantiasis, filarial
- MeSH C03.335.508.700.750.361.518 – loiasis
- MeSH C03.335.508.700.750.361.588 – mansonelliasis
- MeSH C03.335.508.700.750.361.699 – onchocerciasis
- MeSH C03.335.508.700.750.361.699.500 – onchocerciasis, ocular
- MeSH C03.335.508.700.750.361.852 – setariasis
- MeSH C03.335.508.700.775 – strongylida infections
- MeSH C03.335.508.700.775.455 – hookworm infections
- MeSH C03.335.508.700.775.455.154 – ancylostomiasis
- MeSH C03.335.508.700.775.455.683 – necatoriasis
- MeSH C03.335.508.700.775.583 – oesophagostomiasis
- MeSH C03.335.508.700.775.773 – strongyle infections, equine
- MeSH C03.335.508.700.775.825 – trichostrongyloidiasis
- MeSH C03.335.508.700.775.825.315 – dictyocaulus infections
- MeSH C03.335.508.700.775.825.400 – haemonchiasis
- MeSH C03.335.508.700.775.825.580 – ostertagiasis
- MeSH C03.335.508.700.775.825.842 – trichostrongylosis

==== MeSH C03.335.865 – trematode infections ====
- MeSH C03.335.865.148 – clonorchiasis
- MeSH C03.335.865.224 – dicrocoeliasis
- MeSH C03.335.865.282 – echinostomiasis
- MeSH C03.335.865.354 – fascioliasis
- MeSH C03.335.865.399 – fascioloidiasis
- MeSH C03.335.865.685 – opisthorchiasis
- MeSH C03.335.865.741 – paragonimiasis
- MeSH C03.335.865.859 – schistosomiasis
- MeSH C03.335.865.859.213 – neuroschistosomiasis
- MeSH C03.335.865.859.427 – schistosomiasis haematobia
- MeSH C03.335.865.859.521 – schistosomiasis japonica
- MeSH C03.335.865.859.576 – schistosomiasis mansoni

=== MeSH C03.701 – parasitic diseases, animal ===
==== MeSH C03.701.377 – helminthiasis, animal ====
- MeSH C03.701.377.315 – dictyocaulus infections
- MeSH C03.701.377.320 – dirofilariasis
- MeSH C03.701.377.444 – fascioloidiasis
- MeSH C03.701.377.656 – monieziasis
- MeSH C03.701.377.820 – setariasis
- MeSH C03.701.377.840 – strongyle infections, equine
- MeSH C03.701.377.868 – toxocariasis

==== MeSH C03.701.688 – protozoan infections, animal ====
- MeSH C03.701.688.122 – babesiosis
- MeSH C03.701.688.235 – cryptosporidiosis
- MeSH C03.701.688.367 – dourine
- MeSH C03.701.688.735 – theileriasis
- MeSH C03.701.688.817 – toxoplasmosis, animal
- MeSH C03.701.688.896 – trypanosomiasis, bovine

=== MeSH C03.752 – protozoan infections ===
==== MeSH C03.752.200 – ciliophora infections ====
- MeSH C03.752.200.146 – balantidiasis

==== MeSH C03.752.250 – coccidiosis ====
- MeSH C03.752.250.269 – cryptosporidiosis
- MeSH C03.752.250.280 – cyclosporiasis
- MeSH C03.752.250.410 – isosporiasis
- MeSH C03.752.250.552 – malaria
- MeSH C03.752.250.552.606 – malaria, avian
- MeSH C03.752.250.552.620 – malaria, cerebral
- MeSH C03.752.250.552.650 – malaria, falciparum
- MeSH C03.752.250.552.650.228 – blackwater fever
- MeSH C03.752.250.552.650.675 – malaria, cerebral
- MeSH C03.752.250.552.700 – malaria, vivax
- MeSH C03.752.250.634 – sarcocystosis
- MeSH C03.752.250.800 – toxoplasmosis
- MeSH C03.752.250.800.110 – toxoplasmosis, animal
- MeSH C03.752.250.800.250 – toxoplasmosis, cerebral
- MeSH C03.752.250.800.445 – toxoplasmosis, congenital
- MeSH C03.752.250.800.640 – toxoplasmosis, ocular

==== MeSH C03.752.625 – protozoan infections, animal ====
- MeSH C03.752.625.122 – babesiosis
- MeSH C03.752.625.235 – cryptosporidiosis
- MeSH C03.752.625.367 – dourine
- MeSH C03.752.625.735 – theileriasis
- MeSH C03.752.625.817 – toxoplasmosis, animal
- MeSH C03.752.625.896 – trypanosomiasis, bovine

==== MeSH C03.752.700 – sarcomastigophora infections ====
- MeSH C03.752.700.500 – mastigophora infections
- MeSH C03.752.700.500.275 – dientamoebiasis
- MeSH C03.752.700.500.381 – giardiasis
- MeSH C03.752.700.500.508 – leishmaniasis
- MeSH C03.752.700.500.508.400 – leishmaniasis, cutaneous
- MeSH C03.752.700.500.508.400.350 – leishmaniasis, diffuse cutaneous
- MeSH C03.752.700.500.508.400.385 – leishmaniasis, mucocutaneous
- MeSH C03.752.700.500.508.510 – leishmaniasis, visceral
- MeSH C03.752.700.500.900 – trichomonas infections
- MeSH C03.752.700.500.900.633 – trichomonas vaginitis
- MeSH C03.752.700.500.935 – trypanosomiasis
- MeSH C03.752.700.500.935.200 – chagas disease
- MeSH C03.752.700.500.935.200.190 – chagas cardiomyopathy
- MeSH C03.752.700.500.935.226 – dourine
- MeSH C03.752.700.500.935.719 – African trypanosomiasis
- MeSH C03.752.700.500.935.802 – trypanosomiasis, bovine
- MeSH C03.752.700.700 – sarcodina infections
- MeSH C03.752.700.700.055 – amebiasis
- MeSH C03.752.700.700.055.203 – acanthamoeba keratitis
- MeSH C03.752.700.700.055.250 – blastocystis infections
- MeSH C03.752.700.700.055.328 – dysentery, amebic
- MeSH C03.752.700.700.055.407 – entamoebiasis
- MeSH C03.752.700.700.055.703 – liver abscess, amebic

==== MeSH C03.752.875 – tick-borne diseases ====
- MeSH C03.752.875.175 – babesiosis
- MeSH C03.752.875.850 – theileriasis

=== MeSH C03.858 – skin diseases, parasitic ===
==== MeSH C03.858.211 – ectoparasitic infestations ====
- MeSH C03.858.211.300 – lice infestations
- MeSH C03.858.211.394 – mite infestations
- MeSH C03.858.211.394.708 – scabies
- MeSH C03.858.211.394.869 – trombiculiasis
- MeSH C03.858.211.503 – myiasis
- MeSH C03.858.211.503.398 – hypodermyiasis
- MeSH C03.858.211.503.744 – screw worm infection
- MeSH C03.858.211.857 – tick infestations

==== MeSH C03.858.560 – leishmaniasis ====
- MeSH C03.858.560.400 – leishmaniasis, cutaneous
- MeSH C03.858.560.400.350 – leishmaniasis, diffuse cutaneous
- MeSH C03.858.560.400.385 – leishmaniasis, mucocutaneous

=== MeSH C03.908 – zoonoses ===
The list continues at List of MeSH codes (C04).
