= Kidney failure =

Disease where the kidneys fail to adequately filter waste products from the blood

- Other names: Renal failure, end-stage renal disease (ESRD), stage 5 chronic kidney disease
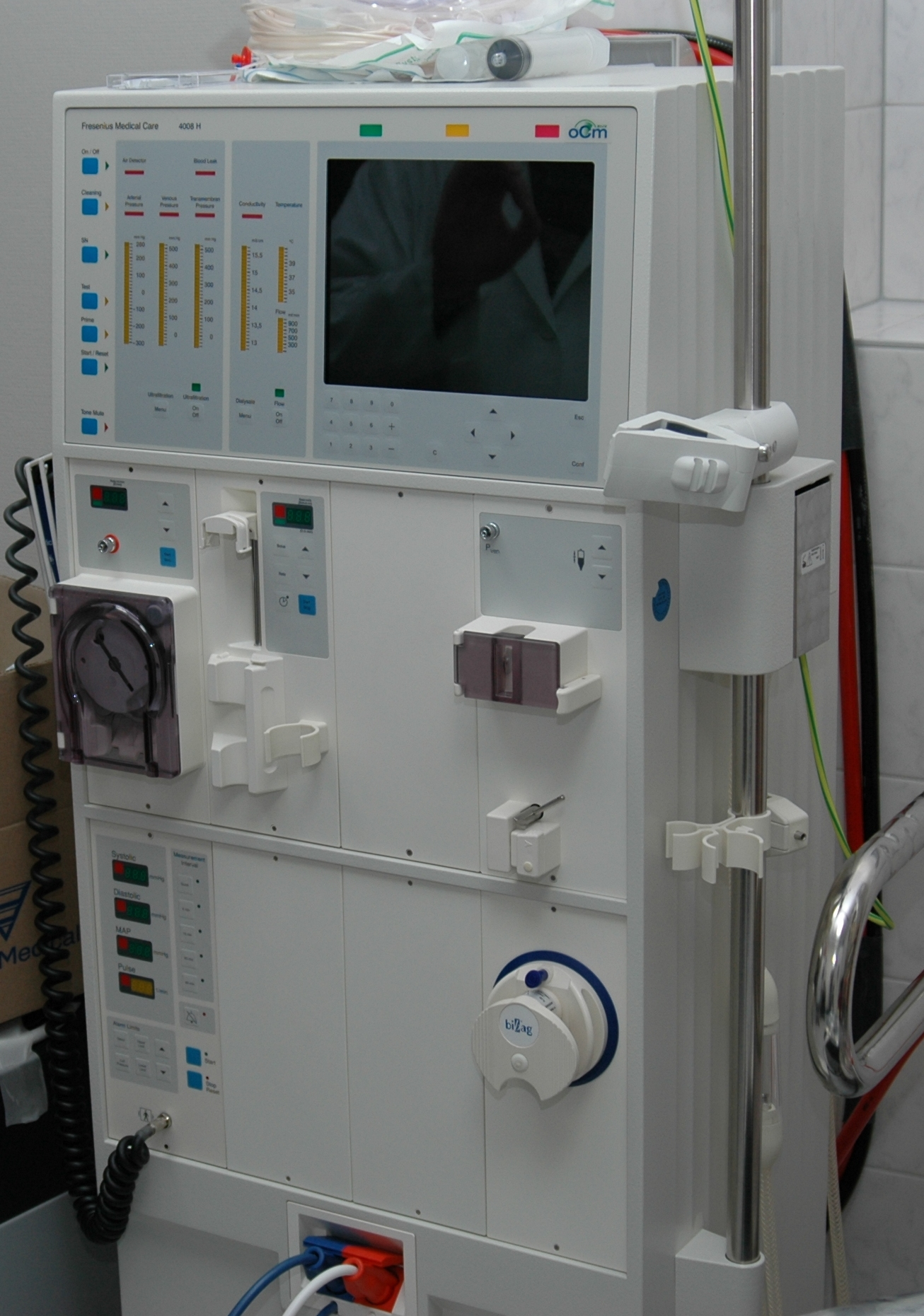
- A hemodialysis machine which is used to replace the function of the kidneys
- Specialty: Nephrology
- Symptoms: Leg swelling, feeling tired, reduced urination, foamy urine, loss of appetite, confusion
- Complications: Acute: Uremia, high blood potassium, volume overload Chronic: Heart disease, high blood pressure, anemia
- Types: Acute kidney failure, chronic kidney failure
- Causes: Acute: Low blood pressure; blockage of the urinary tract; certain medications; muscle breakdown; hemolytic uremic syndrome; Chronic: Diabetes; high blood pressure; nephrotic syndrome; polycystic kidney disease
- Diagnostic method: Acute: Decreased urine production; increased serum creatinine; Chronic: Glomerular filtration rate (GFR); < 15
- Treatment: Acute: Depends on the cause Chronic: Hemodialysis, peritoneal dialysis, kidney transplant
- Frequency: Acute: 3 per 1,000 per year Chronic: 1 per 1,000 (US)

Kidney failure, also known as renal failure or end-stage renal disease (ESRD), is a medical condition in which the kidneys can no longer adequately filter waste products from the blood, functioning at less than 15% of normal levels. Kidney failure is classified as either acute kidney failure, which develops rapidly and may resolve; and chronic kidney failure, which develops slowly and can often be irreversible. Symptoms may include leg swelling, feeling tired, vomiting, loss of appetite, and confusion. Complications of acute and chronic failure include uremia, hyperkalemia, and volume overload. Complications of chronic failure also include heart disease, high blood pressure, and anaemia.

Causes of acute kidney failure include low blood pressure, blockage of the urinary tract, certain medications, muscle breakdown, and hemolytic uremic syndrome. Causes of chronic kidney failure include diabetes, high blood pressure, nephrotic syndrome, and polycystic kidney disease. Diagnosis of acute failure is often based on a combination of factors such as decreased urine production or increased serum creatinine. Diagnosis of chronic failure is based on a glomerular filtration rate (GFR) of less than 15 or the need for renal replacement therapy. It is also equivalent to stage 5 chronic kidney disease.

Treatment of acute failure depends on the underlying cause. Treatment of chronic failure may include hemodialysis, peritoneal dialysis, or a kidney transplant. Hemodialysis uses a machine to filter the blood outside the body. In peritoneal dialysis specific fluid is placed into the abdominal cavity and then drained, with this process being repeated multiple times per day. Kidney transplantation involves surgically placing a kidney from someone else and then taking immunosuppressant medication to prevent rejection. Other recommended measures for chronic disease include staying active and specific dietary changes. Depression is also common among patients with kidney failure, and is associated with poor outcomes including higher risk of kidney function decline, hospitalization, and death. A recent PCORI-funded study of patients with kidney failure receiving outpatient hemodialysis found similar effectiveness between nonpharmacological and pharmacological treatments for depression.

In the United States, acute failure affects about 3 per 1,000 people a year. Chronic failure affects about 1 in 1,000 people with 3 per 10,000 people newly developing the condition each year. In Canada, the lifetime risk of kidney failure or end-stage renal disease (ESRD) was estimated to be 2.66% for men and 1.76% for women. Acute failure is often reversible while chronic failure often is not. With appropriate treatment many with chronic disease can continue working.

== Classification ==
Kidney failure can be divided into two categories: acute kidney failure or chronic kidney failure. The type of renal failure is differentiated by the trend in the serum creatinine; other factors that may help differentiate acute kidney failure from chronic kidney failure include anemia and the kidney size on sonography as chronic kidney disease generally leads to anemia and small kidney size.

=== Acute kidney failure ===
Acute kidney injury (AKI), previously called acute renal failure (ARF), is a rapidly progressive loss of renal function, generally characterized by oliguria (decreased urine production, quantified as less than 400 mL per day in adults, less than 0.5 mL/kg/h in children or less than 1 mL/kg/h in infants); and fluid and electrolyte imbalance. AKI can result from a variety of causes, generally classified as prerenal, intrinsic, and postrenal. Many people diagnosed with paraquat intoxication experience AKI, sometimes requiring hemodialysis.

=== Chronic kidney failure ===
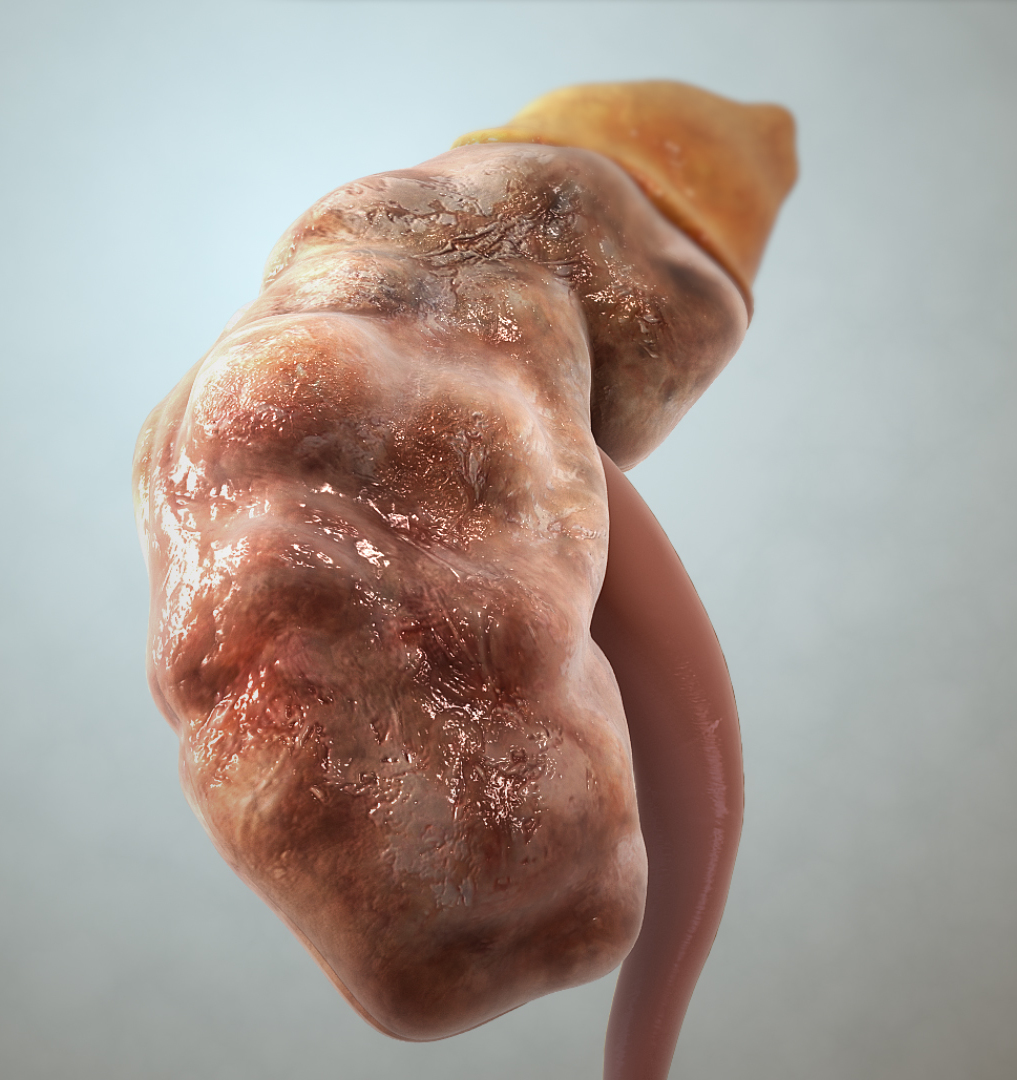
Illustration of a kidney from a person with chronic renal failure

Chronic kidney disease (CKD) can also develop slowly and, initially, show few symptoms. CKD can be the long term consequence of irreversible acute disease or part of a disease progression. CKD is divided into 5 different stages (1–5) according to the estimated glomerular filtration rate (eGFR). In CKD1, eGFR is normal and in CKD5 eGFR has decreased to less than 15 ml/min.

=== Acute-on-chronic kidney failure ===
Acute kidney injuries can be present on top of chronic kidney disease, a condition called acute-on-chronic kidney failure (AoCRF). The acute part of AoCRF may be reversible, and the goal of treatment, as with AKI, is to return the person to baseline kidney function, typically measured by serum creatinine. Like AKI, AoCRF can be difficult to distinguish from chronic kidney disease if the person has not been monitored by a physician and no baseline (i.e., past) blood work is available for comparison.

== Signs and symptoms ==
Symptoms can vary from person to person. Someone in early stage kidney disease may not feel sick or notice symptoms as they occur. When the kidneys fail to filter properly, waste accumulates in the blood and the body, a condition called azotemia. Very low levels of azotemia may produce few, if any, symptoms. If the disease progresses, symptoms become noticeable (if the failure is of sufficient degree to cause symptoms). Kidney failure accompanied by noticeable symptoms is termed uraemia.

Symptoms of kidney failure include the following:

- High levels of urea in the blood, which can result in:
  - Vomiting or diarrhea (or both) that may lead to dehydration
  - Nausea
  - Weight loss
  - Nocturnal urination (nocturia)
  - More frequent urination, or in greater amounts than usual, with pale urine
  - Less frequent urination, or in smaller amounts than usual, with dark coloured urine
  - Blood in the urine
  - Pressure, or difficulty urinating
  - Unusual amounts of urination, usually in large quantities
- A buildup of phosphates in the blood that diseased kidneys cannot filter out may cause:
  - Itching
  - Bone damage
  - Nonunion in broken bones
  - Muscle cramps (caused by low levels of calcium which can be associated with hyperphosphatemia)
- A buildup of potassium in the blood that diseased kidneys cannot filter out (called hyperkalemia) may cause:
  - Abnormal heart rhythms
  - Muscle paralysis
- Failure of kidneys to remove excess fluid may cause:
  - Swelling of the hands, legs, ankles, feet, or face
  - Shortness of breath due to extra fluid on the lungs (may also be caused by anemia)
- Polycystic kidney disease, which causes large, fluid-filled cysts on the kidneys and sometimes the liver, can cause:
  - Pain in the back or side
- Healthy kidneys produce the hormone erythropoietin that stimulates the bone marrow to make oxygen-carrying red blood cells. As the kidneys fail, they produce less erythropoietin, resulting in decreased production of red blood cells to replace the natural breakdown of old red blood cells. As a result, the blood carries less hemoglobin, a condition known as anemia. This can result in:
  - Feeling tired or weak
  - Memory problems
  - Difficulty concentrating
  - Dizziness
  - Low blood pressure
- Normally proteins are too large to pass through the kidneys. However they are able to pass through when the glomeruli are damaged. This does not cause symptoms until extensive kidney damage has occurred, after which symptoms include:
  - Foamy or bubbly urine
  - Swelling in the hands, feet, abdomen, and face
- Other symptoms include:
  - Appetite loss, which may include a bad taste in the mouth
  - Difficulty sleeping
  - Darkening of the skin
  - Excess protein in the blood
  - With high doses of penicillin, people with kidney failure may experience seizures

== Causes ==
=== Acute kidney injury ===
Acute kidney injury (previously known as acute renal failure) – or AKI – usually occurs when the blood supply to the kidneys is suddenly interrupted or when the kidneys become overloaded with toxins. Causes of acute kidney injury include accidents, injuries, or complications from surgeries in which the kidneys are deprived of normal blood flow for extended periods of time. Heart-bypass surgery is an example of one such procedure.

Drug overdoses, accidental or from chemical overloads of drugs such as antibiotics or chemotherapy, along with bee stings may also cause the onset of acute kidney injury. Unlike chronic kidney disease, however, the kidneys can often recover from acute kidney injury, allowing the person with AKI to resume a normal life. People with acute kidney injury require supportive treatment until their kidneys recover function, and they often remain at increased risk of developing future kidney failure.

Among the accidental causes of renal failure is the crush syndrome, when large amounts of toxins are suddenly released in the blood circulation after a long compressed limb is suddenly relieved from the pressure obstructing the blood flow through its tissues, causing ischemia. The resulting overload can lead to the clogging and the destruction of the kidneys. It is a reperfusion injury that appears after the release of the crushing pressure. The mechanism is believed to be the release into the bloodstream of muscle breakdown products – notably myoglobin, potassium, and phosphorus – that are the products of rhabdomyolysis (the breakdown of skeletal muscle damaged by ischemic conditions). The specific action on the kidneys is not fully understood, but may be due in part to nephrotoxic metabolites of myoglobin.

=== Chronic kidney failure ===
Chronic kidney failure has numerous causes. The most common causes of chronic failure are diabetes mellitus and long-term, uncontrolled hypertension. Polycystic kidney disease is another well-known cause of chronic failure. The majority of people affected with polycystic kidney disease have a family history of the disease. Systemic lupus erythematosus (SLE) is also a known cause of chronic kidney failure. Other genetic illnesses cause kidney failure, as well.

Overuse of common drugs such as ibuprofen, and acetaminophen (paracetamol) can also cause chronic kidney failure. Some infectious disease agents, such as hantavirus, can attack the kidneys, causing kidney failure.

Long term lithium treatment is known to cause chronic kidney disease after 10-20 years of treatment in 1-5% of people. End stage renal failure due to lithium occurs in 0.53% of people versus 0.2% in the general population. Dosing lithium more than once per day is associated with more kidney damage. Kidney harm can be mitigated by dosing lithium once per day at night and keeping the dose as low as possible. Dosing lithium once per day allows for long periods where the kidney is exposed to low levels of lithium, which minimizes kidney harm.

=== Genetic predisposition ===
The APOL1 gene has been proposed as a major genetic risk locus for a spectrum of nondiabetic renal failure in individuals of African origin, these include HIV-associated nephropathy (HIVAN), primary nonmonogenic forms of focal segmental glomerulosclerosis, and hypertension affiliated chronic kidney disease not attributed to other etiologies. Two western African variants in APOL1 have been shown to be associated with end stage kidney disease in African Americans and Hispanic Americans.

== Diagnostic approach ==
=== Measurement for CKD ===
Stages of kidney failure

Chronic kidney failure is measured in five stages, which are calculated using the person's GFR, or glomerular filtration rate.

- Stage 1 CKD is mildly diminished renal function, with few overt symptoms.
- Stages 2 and 3 need increasing levels of supportive care from their medical providers to slow and treat their renal dysfunction.
- People with stage 4 and 5 kidney failure usually require preparation towards active treatment in order to survive.
- Stage 5 CKD is considered a severe illness and requires some form of renal replacement therapy (dialysis) or kidney transplant whenever feasible.

Glomerular filtration rate

A normal GFR varies according to many factors, including sex, age, body size and ethnic background. Renal professionals consider the glomerular filtration rate (GFR) to be the best overall index of kidney function. The National Kidney Foundation offers an easy-to-use on-line GFR calculator for anyone who is interested in knowing their glomerular filtration rate. (A serum creatinine level, a simple blood test, is needed to use the calculator.)

== Complications ==
Those with end stage renal failure who undergo haemodialysis have higher risk of spontaneous intra-abdominal bleeding than the general population (21.2%) and non-occlusive mesenteric ischemia (18.1%). Meanwhile, those undergoing peritoneal dialysis have a higher chance of developing peritonitis and gastrointestinal perforation. However, the rate of acute pancreatitis does not differ from the general population.

== Treatment ==
Treatment for kidney failure centers on renal replacement therapy, conservative management, and complication control, as no curative options exist for chronic cases. It requires multidisciplinary care and patient education for shared decision-making on RRT initiation.

=== Renal replacement therapy ===
Renal replacement therapy (RRT) modalities include hemodialysis, peritoneal dialysis, and kidney transplantation, selected based on patient lifestyle, vascular access feasibility, and comorbidities. Hemodialysis provides extracorporeal filtration in which machines take over the kidney's filtering function, clearing the blood of extra fluid, dissolved substances, and toxins. Peritoneal dialysis offers home-based continuous therapy using the peritoneum. Guideline recommends advance care planning at GFR 20-30 mL/min, noting equivalent survival across modalities when optimized, though hemodialysis risks infection and peritoneal dialysis risks peritonitis.

=== Diet ===
In non-diabetics and people with type 1 diabetes, a low protein diet is found to have a preventive effect on progression of chronic kidney disease. However, this effect does not apply to people with type 2 diabetes. A whole food, plant-based diet may help some people with kidney disease. A high protein diet from either animal or plant sources appears to have negative effects on kidney function at least in the short term.

=== Slowing progression ===
People who receive earlier referrals to a nephrology specialist, meaning a longer time before they must start dialysis, have a shorter initial hospitalization and reduced risk of death after the start of dialysis. Other methods of reducing disease progression include minimizing exposure to nephrotoxins such as NSAIDs and intravenous contrast.
