= Distemper =

Distemper may refer to:

== Illness ==
- A viral infection
  - Canine distemper, a disease of dogs
  - Feline distemper, a disease of cats
  - Phocine distemper, a disease of seals
- A bacterial infection
  - Equine distemper, or strangles, a bacterial infection of the horse
- Derangement or disturbance of the four humours or "temper", in pre-modern medicine

== Other uses ==
- Distemper (paint), a decorative paint and a historical medium for painting pictures
- Distemper (band), a Russian ska punk band
- Distemper (album), by The New Christs
- Remix dystemper, a remix album by Skinny Puppy

== See also ==
- Murrain, a name of any of a number of serious illnesses among cattle and sheep, for which the name 'Distemper' was used in mid 18th century England.
