= Visna-maedi virus =

Virus classification
- (unranked): Virus
- Realm: Riboviria
- Kingdom: Pararnavirae
- Phylum: Artverviricota
- Class: Revtraviricetes
- Order: Ortervirales
- Family: Retroviridae
- Genus: Lentivirus
- Species: Lentivirus ovivismae

Synonyms
- Maedi virus; Visna virus

Species of virus

Visna-maedi virus (also known as visna virus, maedi-visna virus and ovine lentivirus) from the genus Lentivirus and subfamily Orthoretrovirinae, is a retrovirus that causes encephalitis and chronic pneumonitis in sheep. It is known as visna when found in the brain, and maedi when infecting the lungs. Lifelong, persistent infections in sheep occur in the lungs, lymph nodes, spleen, joints, central nervous system, and mammary glands; The condition is sometimes known as ovine progressive pneumonia (OPP), particularly in the United States, or Montana sheep disease. White blood cells of the monocyte/macrophage lineage are the main target of the virus.

== Viral infection ==
First described in 1954 by Bjorn Sigurdsson in Iceland, Maedi-visna virus was the first lentivirus to be isolated and characterized, accomplished in 1957 by Sigurdsson. Maedi (Icelandic mæði 'dyspnoea') and visna (Icelandic visna 'wasting' or 'shrinking' of the spinal cord) refer to endemic sheep herd conditions that were only found to be related after Sigurdsson's work.

Visna infection may progress to total paralysis leading to death via inanition; however, if given assistance in eating and drinking, infected animals may survive for long periods of time, sometimes greater than ten years. Viral replication is almost exclusively associated with macrophages in infected tissues; however, replication is restricted in these cells—that is, the majority of cells containing viral RNA do not produce infectious virus.

The disease was introduced to Iceland following an import of Karakul sheep from Germany in 1933. The susceptibility to maedi-visna infection varies across sheep breeds, with coarse-wool breeds apparently more susceptible than fine-wool sheep. Attempts at vaccination against maedi-visna virus have failed to induce immunity, occasionally causing increased viremia and more severe disease. Eradication programs have been established in countries worldwide.

== Associated diseases and Clinical Signs ==
Visna-maedi is a chronic viral disease prevalent in adult sheep. The disease is rarely found in certain species of goat. Visna-maedi virus is also referred to as ovine progressive pneumonia (OPP). This disease corresponds to two clinical entities caused by the same virus. Maedi is a form that results in a chronic progressive pneumonia. Visna refers to the neurological form of the disease and predominantly causes meningoencephalitis in adult sheep. This disease has inflicted many economic losses worldwide due to the long incubation period and the high mortality rate of sheep and goats. MV virus can infect sheep of any age but clinical symptoms rarely occur in sheep less than two years old. The onset of the diseases is gradual resulting in relentless loss of weight in addition to breathing problems. Cough, abortion, rapid breathing, depression, chronic mastitis and arthritis are also additional symptoms observed. These symptoms appear mostly in animals over the age of three and therefore might spread to other flocks before clinical diagnosis can be achieved. Animals showing the above symptoms might die within six months of infection. This causal lentivirus can be found in monocytes, lymphocytes and macrophages of infected sheep in the presence of humoral and cell mediated immune response and can also be detected by conducting several serological tests. Transmission of the disease occurs most commonly via the oral route caused by ingestion of colostrum or milk that contains the virus or inhalation of infected aerosol droplets. Due to variation of the strains of MVV, some of the association clinical symptoms may be more pre-dominant in a flock relative to others along with differences in genetic susceptibility patterns.

== Viral replication ==
=== Entry ===
Visna-maedi virus (VMV) belongs to the small ruminant lentivirus group (SRLV). In general, SRLVs enter the cell through the interaction of their glycosylated envelope protein with a cellular receptor on the cell's plasma membrane facilitating fusion of the viral and cellular membrane. However, the specific cellular receptor that VMV binds is not entirely certain. A few studies have proposed MHC class II, CD4 and CXCR4 proteins as possible receptors however, none of these proteins have been established as the main receptor. Another study suggests that C-type lectins part of the mannose receptor (MR) family play a role as an alternative SRLV receptor. The mannose receptor is a 180-kDa transmembrane protein with eight tandem C-type lectin carbohydrate recognition domains (CRD) of which CRD4 and CRD5 are essential in recognizing mannose, fucose and N-acetyl glucosamine residues. Studies suggest that VMV gains entrance to the cell via mannosylated residues on its envelope proteins. MR is involved in recognizing the surface of pathogens and is involved in phago- and endocytosis and mediating antigen processing and presentation in a variety of cells including monocyte/macrophages and endothelial cells.

=== Replication ===
Visna-maedi virus is a retrovirus meaning its genome consists of a (+)RNA that undergoes reverse transcription and then is integrated into the host's genome after infection. This integration is what leads to VMV's lifelong persistent infection. VMV has a long incubation period. During the initial outbreak among sheep in Iceland, there was no sign of clinical disease until six years after the importation of the Karakul sheep, which brought the virus from Germany to Iceland. Susceptibility to infection also increases with a higher level. VMV infects cells of the monocyte lineage, but only replicates at high levels when the monocytes are more mature/differentiated. Infected differentiated monocytes, also known as macrophages, will continuously present VMV antigens inducing T-lymphocytes to produce cytokines that in turn induce the differentiation of monocytes.

== Viral transmission ==
=== Horizontal transmission ===
Horizontal transmission plays an important role among livestock due to their often close quarters, especially during winter stabling. Free virus or virus infected cells are generally transferred in through inhalation of respiratory secretions. Additionally, fecal-oral transmission often occurs through contamination of drinking water. Sexual transmission has also been shown to be possible. No link has yet been made between transmission and other excretory products such as saliva and urine.

=== Vertical transmission ===
In endemically infected flocks of livestock, free virus and virus infected cells are passed through from mothers to lambs via colostrum and milk. This is one of the key features in affected populations, as it contributes greatly to the virus becoming endemic in the flock. Lambs are extremely vulnerable to infection due to the permeability of the guts of newborns.

== Virion structure ==
Visna virus particles are spheres approximately 100 nm in diameter. Virions consist of an icosahedral capsid surrounded by an envelope derived from the host plasma membrane. Inside the capsid are the nucleoprotein-genome complex and the reverse transcriptase and integrase enzymes. A crystal structure of the virion has not been obtained and the triangulation number of the icosahedron is unknown.

== Tropism ==
The term viral tropism refers to the cell types a virus infects. Visna virus is generally known to target cells of the immune system, mainly monocytes and their mature form, macrophages. Studies suggest that the amount of viral replication appears to have a direct correlation with the maturity of the infected cells, with relatively little virus replication in monocytes when compared to more mature macrophages.

Infection can also occur in mammary epithelial and endothelial cells, implying mammary glands as a main viral reservoir, showing the importance that vertical transmission plays in the spread of the virus.

== Genome structure ==
Visna virus has a positive-strand RNA genome approximately 9.2 kilobases in length. As a retrovirus in the genus lentivirinae, the genome is reverse transcribed into proviral DNA. The visna virus genome resembles that of other lentiviruses, in terms of the gene functions that are present. Visna virus is closely related to the caprine arthritis encephalitis virus but has limited nucleotide sequence similarity with other lentiviruses.

The visna viral genome encodes three structural genes characteristic of retroviruses, gag (group specific antigen), pol (polymerase), and env (envelope protein). The genome also encodes two regulatory proteins, tat (trans-activator of transcription) and rev (regulator of virion protein expression). A rev response element (RRE) exists inside the env gene. An auxiliary gene, vif (viral infectivity factor), is also encoded. However, the number and role of auxiliary genes varies by strain of visna virus. The genome sequence is flanked by 5’ and 3’ long terminal repeats (LTRs).

The viral LTRs are essential for viral transcription. The LTRs include a TATA box at the -20 position and a recognition site for the AP-4 transcription factor at the -60 position. There are several AP-1 transcription factor binding sites in the viral LTRs. The closest AP-1 binding site is bound by the Jun and Fos proteins to activate transcription. A duplicated motif in the visna virus LTR is associated with cell tropism and neurovirulence.

The gag gene encodes three final glycoprotein products: the capsid, the nucleocapsid, and the matrix protein which links the capsid and the envelope.

The env gene is translated into a single precursor polyprotein that is cleaved by a host protease into two proteins, the surface glycoprotein and the transmembrane glycoprotein. The transmembrane glycoprotein is anchored inside the envelope lipid bilayer while the surface glycoprotein is non-covalently linked to the transmembrane glycoprotein.

The pol gene encodes five enzymatic functions: a reverse transcriptase, RNase H, dUTPase, integrase, and protease. The reverse transcriptase is an RNA-dependent DNA polymerase that exists as a heterodimer protein with RNase H activity. The dUTPase enzyme is not present in all lentiviruses. The role of the dUTPase in the visna virus life cycle is unclear. dUTPase-deficient visna virus knockout strains show no decrease in pathogenicity in vivo. The integrase enzyme exists inside the viral capsid, facilitating integration into the host chromosome after entry and virion uncoating. The protease cleaves the gag and pol polyprotein precursor.

The viral tat gene encodes a 94-amino acid protein. Tat is the most enigmatic of the proteins of the visna virus. Most studies have indicated that Tat is a transcription factor necessary for viral transcription from the LTRs. Tat contains both a suppressor domain and a powerful acidic activator domain on the N-terminus. It has been suggested that Tat interacts with the cellular AP-1 transcription factors Fos and Jun to bind to the TATA-binding protein and activate transcription. However, other studies have suggested that the visna virus "Tat" protein is not a trans-activator for transcription but instead exhibits a function involved in cell cycle arrest, making it more closely related to the HIV-1 Vpr protein than Tat.

The viral rev gene encodes a post-transcriptional regulatory protein. Rev is required for expression of unspliced or partially spliced mRNA coding for the viral envelope protein, including gag and env in a similar manner as the HIV Rev protein. Rev binds as a multimer to the Rev Response Element (RRE) which has a stem-loop secondary structure.

The function of the auxiliary gene vif is not fully known. The vif gene product, a 29 kDa protein, induces a weak immune response in animals. Deletion experiments have demonstrated that the vif gene is essential for infectivity.

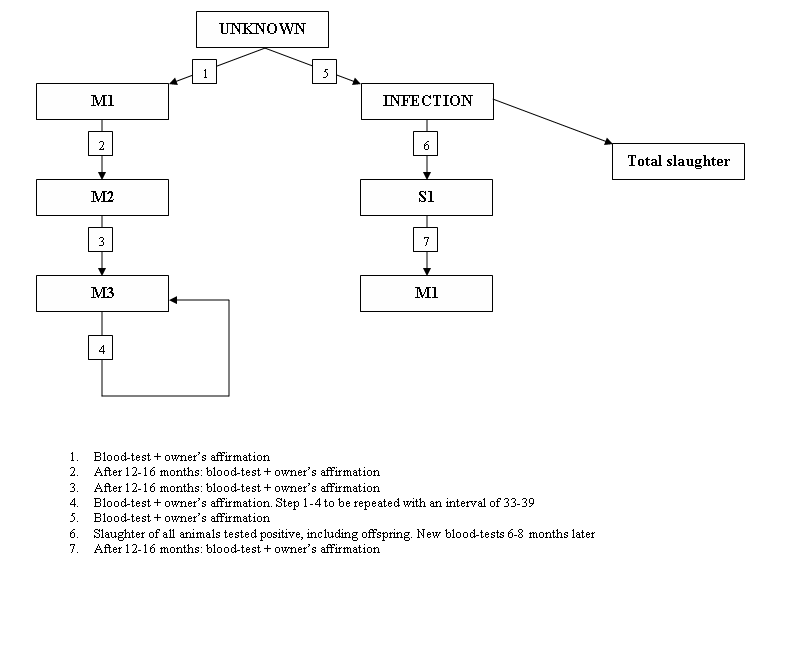
The maedi-visna control programme of the Swedish Board of Agriculture

== Model system for HIV infection ==
Though it does not produce severe immunodeficiency, visna shares many characteristics with human immunodeficiency virus, including the establishment of persistent infection with chronic active lymphoproliferation; however, visna virus does not infect T-lymphocytes. The relationship of visna and HIV as lentiviruses was first published in 1985 by visna researcher Janice E. Clements and colleagues in the HIV field. It has been postulated that the effects of maedi-visna infection in sheep are the "equivalent" of central nervous system disease and wasting syndrome found in human AIDS patients. Despite limited sequence homology with HIV, the genomic organization of visna is very similar, allowing visna infection to be used as an in vivo and in vitro model system for HIV infection.

Research using visna was important in the identification and characterization of HIV. Nucleotide sequence analysis demonstrated that the AIDS virus was a retrovirus related to visna and provided early clues as to the mechanism of HIV infection.
