= HIV-associated nephropathy =

- Specialty: Nephrology

HIV-associated nephropathy (HIVAN) refers to kidney disease developing in association with infection by human immunodeficiency virus, the virus that causes AIDS. The most common, or "classical", type of HIV-associated nephropathy is a collapsing focal segmental glomerulosclerosis (FSGS), though other forms of kidney disease may also occur. Regardless of the underlying histology, kidney disease in HIV-positive patients is associated with an increased risk of death.

== Cause ==
HIVAN may be caused by direct infection of the kidney cells by HIV, with resulting kidney damage through the viral gene products. It could also be caused by the release of cytokines during HIV infection. Usually occurs only in advanced HIV disease and approximately 80% of patients with HIVAN have a CD4 count of less than 200. HIVAN presents with nephrotic syndrome and progressive kidney failure. Despite being a cause of chronic kidney failure, kidney sizes are usually normal or large.

== Pathology ==
Abnormalities involve all components of the nephron. Typical findings are that of collapsing capillary loops, areas of scarring called focal segmental glomerulosclerosis (FSGS), microcystic tubular dilatation that is highly echogenic, and prominent podocytes. The characteristic feature of collapsing glomerulopathy is collapse of glomerular tuft and proliferation and hyperplasia of glomerular visceral epithelial cells. Its prognosis is always poor, as it rapidly progresses to chronic kidney disease.

== Treatment ==
There are no adequate data from randomised controlled trials.

Treatment with highly active antiretroviral therapy and angiotensin converting enzyme inhibitors or angiotensin receptor blockers has been shown to be beneficial and should be given to all patients unless otherwise contraindicated. General renoprotective measures and the treatment of the complications of nephrotic syndrome and kidney failure are adjunctive.

Corticosteroid treatment can be useful in patients who do not respond to initial treatment. There is some evidence that ciclosporin might be helpful in selective cases, however further study of both steroids and ciclosporin is needed before these types of drugs can be considered standard treatment.

== Incidence ==
HIVAN is the third most common cause of end stage kidney failure among African Americans, and commonly seen in African-American patients with HIV compared to other ethnic groups. In the USA 12% of patients dying with AIDS have histologically proven HIVAN, the worldwide incidence amongst AIDS patients appears to be similar. A South African study at Tygerberg Hospital, Stellenbosch University, has shown HIVAN histology in 33/61(54%) biopsies performed in HIV positive patients.
