= West Nile fever =

Human disease caused by West Nile virus infection

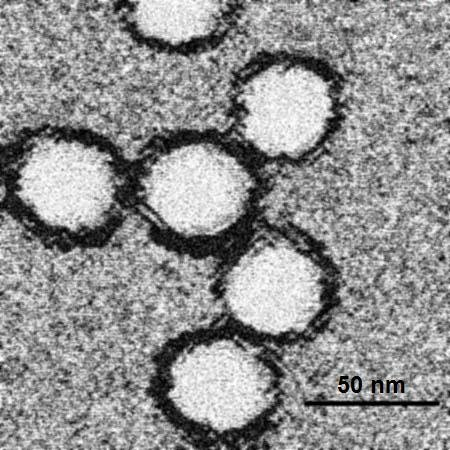
- West Nile virus
- Specialty: Infectious disease
- Symptoms: None, fever, headache, vomiting, diarrhea, muscle aches, rash
- Complications: Encephalitis, meningitis
- Usual onset: 2 to 14 days after exposure
- Duration: Weeks to months
- Causes: West Nile virus spread by mosquito
- Risk factors: Infants, elderly, weak immune system
- Diagnostic method: Based on symptoms and blood tests
- Prevention: Reducing mosquitoes, preventing mosquito bites
- Treatment: Supportive care (pain medication)
- Prognosis: 10% risk of death among those seriously affected

West Nile fever is an infection by the West Nile virus, which is typically spread by mosquitoes. In about 80% of infections people have few or no symptoms. About 20% of people develop a fever, headache, vomiting, or a rash. In less than 1% of people, encephalitis or meningitis occurs, with associated neck stiffness, confusion, or seizures. Recovery may take weeks to months. The risk of death among those in whom the nervous system is affected is about 10%.

West Nile virus (WNV) is usually spread by mosquitoes that become infected when they feed on infected birds. Birds often carry the disease. Rarely the virus is spread through blood transfusions, organ transplants, or from mother to baby during pregnancy, delivery, or breastfeeding, but it otherwise does not spread directly between people. Risks for severe disease include being very young, over 60 years old, having a weak immune system, and having other health problems. Diagnosis is typically based on symptoms and blood tests.

There is no human vaccine. The best way to reduce the risk of infection is to avoid mosquito bites. Mosquito populations may be reduced by eliminating standing pools of water, such as in old tires, buckets, gutters, and swimming pools. When mosquitoes cannot be avoided, mosquito repellent, window screens, and mosquito nets reduce the likelihood of being bitten. There is no specific treatment for the disease; pain medications may reduce symptoms.

The virus was discovered in Uganda in 1937, and was first detected in North America in 1999. WNV has occurred in Europe, Africa, Asia, Australia, and North America. In the United States thousands of cases are reported a year, with most occurring in August and September. It can occur in outbreaks of disease. Severe disease may also occur in horses, for which a vaccine is available. A surveillance system in birds is useful for early detection of a potential human outbreak.

== Signs and symptoms ==
About 80% of those infected with West Nile virus (WNV) show no symptoms and go unreported. About 20% of infected people develop symptoms. These vary in severity, and begin 3 to 14 days after being bitten. Most people with mild symptoms of WNV recover completely, though fatigue and weakness may last for weeks or months. Symptoms may range from mild, such as fever, to severe, such as paralysis and meningitis. A severe infection can last weeks and can, rarely, cause permanent brain damage. Death may ensue if the central nervous system is affected. Medical conditions such as cancer and diabetes, and age over 60 years, increase the risk of developing severe symptoms.

Headache can be a prominent symptom of WNV fever, meningitis, encephalitis, meningoencephalitis, and it may or may not be present in poliomyelitis-like syndrome. Thus, headache is not a useful indicator of neuroinvasive disease.

- West Nile fever (WNF), which occurs in 20 percent of cases, is a febrile syndrome that causes flu-like symptoms. Most characterizations of WNF describe it as a mild, acute syndrome lasting 3 to 6 days after symptom onset. Systematic follow-up studies of patients with WNF have not been done, so this information is largely anecdotal. Possible symptoms include high fever, headache, chills, excessive sweating, weakness, fatigue, swollen lymph nodes, drowsiness, pain in the joints and flu-like symptoms. There may be gastrointestinal symptoms including nausea, vomiting, loss of appetite, and diarrhea. Fewer than one-third of patients develop a rash.
- West Nile neuroinvasive disease (WNND), which occurs in less than 1 percent of cases, is when the virus infects the central nervous system resulting in meningitis, encephalitis, meningoencephalitis or a poliomyelitis-like syndrome. Many patients with WNND have normal neuroimaging studies, although abnormalities may be present in various cerebral areas including the basal ganglia, thalamus, cerebellum, and brainstem.
- West Nile virus encephalitis (WNE) is the most common neuroinvasive manifestation of WNND. WNE presents with similar symptoms to other viral encephalitis with fever, headaches, and altered mental status. A prominent finding in WNE is muscular weakness (30 to 50 percent of patients with encephalitis), often with lower motor neuron symptoms, flaccid paralysis, and hyporeflexia with no sensory abnormalities.
- West Nile meningitis (WNM) usually involves fever, headache, stiff neck and pleocytosis, an increase of white blood cells in cerebrospinal fluid. Changes in consciousness are not usually seen and are mild when present.
- West Nile meningoencephalitis is inflammation of both the brain (encephalitis) and meninges (meningitis).
- West Nile poliomyelitis (WNP), an acute flaccid paralysis syndrome associated with WNV infection, is less common than WNM or WNE. This syndrome is generally characterized by the acute onset of asymmetric limb weakness or paralysis in the absence of sensory loss. Pain sometimes precedes the paralysis. The paralysis can occur in the absence of fever, headache, or other common symptoms associated with WNV infection. Involvement of respiratory muscles, leading to acute respiratory failure, sometimes occurs.
- West-Nile reversible paralysis, Like WNP, the weakness or paralysis is asymmetric. Reported cases have been noted to have an initial preservation of deep tendon reflexes, which is not expected for a pure anterior horn involvement. Disconnect of upper motor neuron influences on the anterior horn cells possibly by myelitis or glutamate excitotoxicity have been suggested as mechanisms. The prognosis for recovery is excellent.
- Nonneurologic complications of WNV infection that may rarely occur include fulminant hepatitis, pancreatitis, myocarditis, rhabdomyolysis, orchitis, nephritis, optic neuritis and cardiac dysrhythmias and hemorrhagic fever with coagulopathy. Chorioretinitis may also be more common than previously thought.
- Skin manifestations, specifically rashes, are common; however, there are few detailed descriptions in case reports, and few images are available. Punctate erythematous, macular, and papular eruptions, most pronounced on the extremities have been observed in WNV cases and in some cases histopathologic findings have shown a sparse superficial perivascular lymphocytic infiltrate, a manifestation commonly seen in viral exanthems. A literature review provides support that this punctate rash is a common cutaneous presentation of WNV infection.

== Cause ==
=== Virology ===
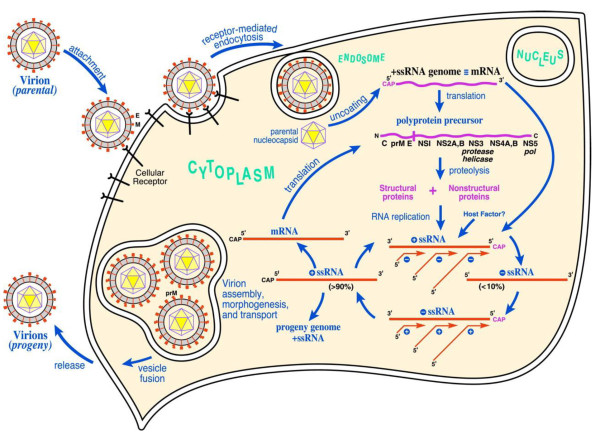
West Nile virus life cycle. After binding and uptake, the virion envelope fuses with cellular membranes, followed by uncoating of the nucleocapsid and release of the RNA genome into the cytoplasm. The viral genome serves as messenger RNA (mRNA) for translation of all viral proteins and as template during RNA replication. Copies are subsequently packaged within new virus particles that are transported in vesicles to the cell membrane.

WNV is one of the Japanese encephalitis antigenic serocomplex of viruses. Image reconstructions and cryoelectron microscopy reveal a 45–50 nm virion covered with a relatively smooth protein surface. This structure is similar to the dengue fever virus; both belong to the genus Flavivirus within the family Flaviviridae. The genetic material of WNV is a positive-sense, single strand of RNA, which is between 11,000 and 12,000 nucleotides long; these genes encode seven nonstructural proteins and three structural proteins. The RNA strand is held within a nucleocapsid formed from 12-kDa protein blocks; the capsid is contained within a host-derived membrane altered by two viral membrane proteins.

West Nile virus has been seen to replicate faster and spread more easily to birds at higher temperatures; one of several ways climate change could affect the epidemiology of this disease.

=== Transmission ===
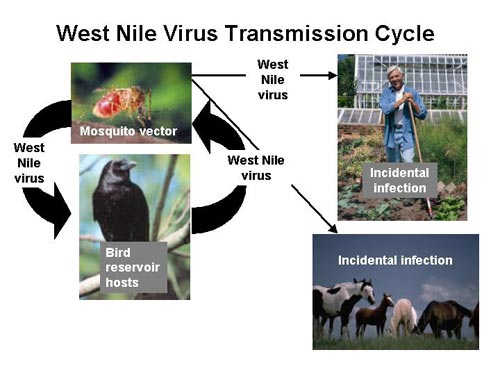
West Nile virus maintains itself in nature by cycling between mosquitoes in the genus Culex and certain species of birds. A mosquito (the vector) bites an uninfected bird (the host), the virus amplifies within the bird, an uninfected mosquito bites the bird and is in turn infected. Other species such as humans and horses are incidental infections, because the virus does not amplify well within these species and they are considered dead-end hosts.

The prime method of spread of the West Nile virus (WNV) is the female mosquito. In Europe, cats were identified as being hosts for West Nile virus. The important mosquito vectors vary according to area; in the United States, Culex pipiens (Eastern United States, and urban and residential areas of the United States north of 36–39°N), Culex tarsalis (Midwest and West), and Culex quinquefasciatus (Southeast) are the main vector species. In Europe, Culex pipiens is the principal vector.

The mosquito species that are most frequently infected with WNV feed primarily on birds. Different species of mosquitos take a blood meal from different types of vertebrate hosts, Mosquitoes show further selectivity, exhibiting preference for different species of birds. In the United States, WNV mosquito vectors feed preferentially on members of the Corvidae and thrush family. Among the preferred species within these families are the American crow, a corvid, and the American robin (Turdus migratorius).

Some species of birds develop sufficient viral levels (>~10^{4.2} log PFU/ml;) after being infected to transmit the infection to biting mosquitoes that in turn go on to infect other birds. In birds that die from WNV, death usually occurs after 4 to 6 days. In mammals and several species of birds, the virus does not multiply as readily and so does not develop high viremia during infection. Mosquitoes biting such hosts are not believed to ingest sufficient virus to become infected, making them so-called dead-end hosts. As a result of the differential infectiousness of hosts, the feeding patterns of mosquitoes play an important role in WNV transmission, and they are partly genetically controlled, even within a species.

Direct human-to-human transmission initially was believed to be caused only by occupational exposure, such as in a laboratory setting, or conjunctival exposure to infected blood. The US outbreak identified additional transmission methods through blood transfusion, organ transplant, intrauterine exposure, and breast feeding. Since 2003, blood banks in the United States routinely screen for the virus among their donors. As a precautionary measure, the UK's National Blood Service initially ran a test for this disease in donors who donate within 28 days of a visit to the United States, Canada, or the northeastern provinces of Italy, and the Scottish National Blood Transfusion Service asks prospective donors to wait 28 days after returning from North America or the northeastern provinces of Italy before donating. There also have been reports of possible transmission of the virus from mother to child during pregnancy or breastfeeding or exposure to the virus in a lab, but these are rare cases and not conclusively confirmed.

Recently, the potential for mosquito saliva to affect the course of WNV disease was demonstrated. Mosquitoes inoculate their saliva into the skin while obtaining blood. Mosquito saliva is a pharmacological cocktail of secreted molecules, principally proteins, that can affect vascular constriction, blood coagulation, platelet aggregation, inflammation, and immunity. It clearly alters the immune response in a manner that may be advantageous to a virus. Studies have shown it can specifically modulate the immune response during early virus infection, and mosquito feeding can exacerbate WNV infection, leading to higher viremia and more severe forms of disease.

==== Vertical transmission ====
Vertical transmission, the transmission of a viral or bacterial disease from the female of the species to her offspring, has been observed in various West Nile virus studies, amongst different species of mosquitoes in both the laboratory and in nature. Mosquito progeny infected vertically in autumn may potentially serve as a mechanism for WNV to overwinter and initiate enzootic horizontal transmission the following spring, although it likely plays little role in transmission in the summer and fall.

=== Risk factors ===
Risk factors independently associated with developing a clinical infection with WNV include infants, having a weak immune system, and a patient history of organ transplantation. For neuroinvasive disease the additional risk factors include older age (>50+), male sex, hypertension, and diabetes mellitus.A genetic factor also appears to increase susceptibility to West Nile disease. A mutation of the gene CCR5 gives some protection against HIV but leads to more serious complications of WNV infection. Carriers of two mutated copies of CCR5 made up 4.0 to 4.5% of a sample of people with West Nile disease, while the incidence of the gene in the general population is only 1.0%.

The most at risk occupations in the U.S. are outdoor workers, for example farmers, loggers, landscapers/groundskeepers, construction workers, painters, summer camp workers and pavers. Two reports of accidental exposure by laboratory personnel working with infected fluids or tissues have been received. While this appears to be a rare occurrence, it highlights the need for proper handling of infected materials. The World Health Organization states that there are no known cases of health care workers acquiring the virus from infected patients when the appropriate infection control precautions are observed.

== Diagnosis ==
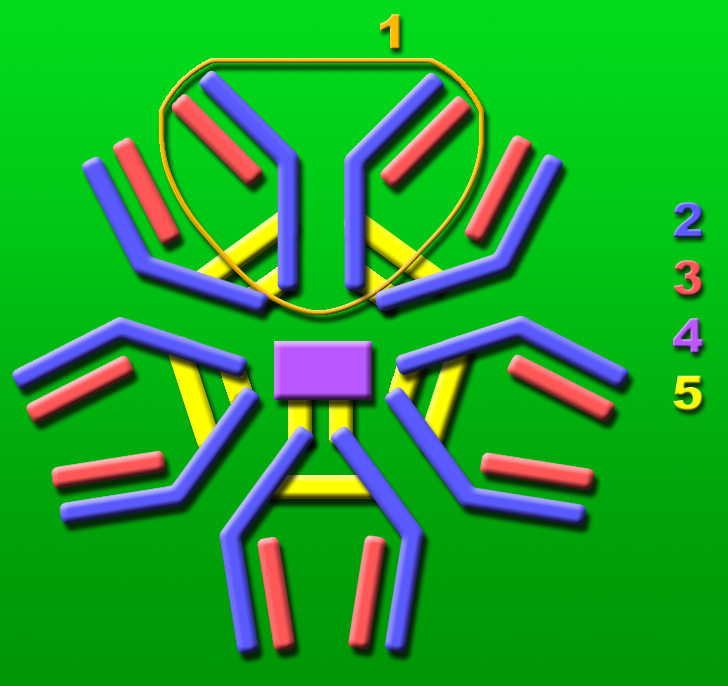
An immunoglobulin M antibody molecule: Definitive diagnosis of WNV is obtained through detection of virus-specific IgM and neutralizing antibodies.

Preliminary diagnosis is often based on the patient's clinical symptoms, places and dates of travel (if patient is from a nonendemic country or area), activities, and epidemiologic history of the location where infection occurred. A recent history of mosquito bites and an acute febrile illness associated with neurologic signs and symptoms should cause clinical suspicion of WNV.

Diagnosis of West Nile virus infections is generally accomplished by serologic testing of blood serum or cerebrospinal fluid (CSF), which is obtained via a lumbar puncture. Initial screening could be done using the ELISA technique detecting immunoglobulins in the sera of the tested individuals.Typical findings of WNV infection include lymphocytic pleocytosis, elevated protein level, reference glucose and lactic acid levels, and no erythrocytes.

Definitive diagnosis of WNV is obtained through detection of virus-specific antibody IgM and neutralizing antibodies. Cases of West Nile virus meningitis and encephalitis that have been serologically confirmed produce similar degrees of CSF pleocytosis and are often associated with substantial CSF neutrophilia. Specimens collected within eight days following onset of illness may not test positive for West Nile IgM, and testing should be repeated. A positive test for West Nile IgG in the absence of a positive West Nile IgM is indicative of a previous flavivirus infection and is not by itself evidence of an acute West Nile virus infection. If cases of suspected West Nile virus infection, sera should be collected on both the acute and convalescent phases of the illness. Convalescent specimens should be collected 2–3 weeks after acute specimens.

It is common in serologic testing for cross-reactions to occur among flaviviruses such as dengue virus (DENV) and tick-borne encephalitis virus; this necessitates caution when evaluating serologic results of flaviviral infections.Four FDA-cleared WNV IgM ELISA kits are commercially available from different manufacturers in the U.S., each of these kits is indicated for use on serum to aid in the presumptive laboratory diagnosis of WNV infection in patients with clinical symptoms of meningitis or encephalitis. Positive WNV test results obtained via use of these kits should be confirmed by additional testing at a state health department laboratory or CDC.

In fatal cases, nucleic acid amplification, histopathology with immunohistochemistry, and virus culture of autopsy tissues can also be useful. Only a few state laboratories or other specialized laboratories, including those at CDC, are capable of doing this specialized testing.

=== Differential diagnosis ===
A number of various diseases may present with symptoms similar to those caused by a clinical West Nile virus infection. Those causing neuroinvasive disease symptoms include the enterovirus infection and bacterial meningitis. Accounting for differential diagnoses is a crucial step in the definitive diagnosis of WNV infection. Consideration of a differential diagnosis is required when a patient presents with unexplained febrile illness, extreme headache, encephalitis or meningitis. Diagnostic and serologic laboratory testing using polymerase chain reaction (PCR) testing and viral culture of CSF to identify the specific pathogen causing the symptoms, is the only currently available means of differentiating between causes of encephalitis and meningitis.

== Prevention ==
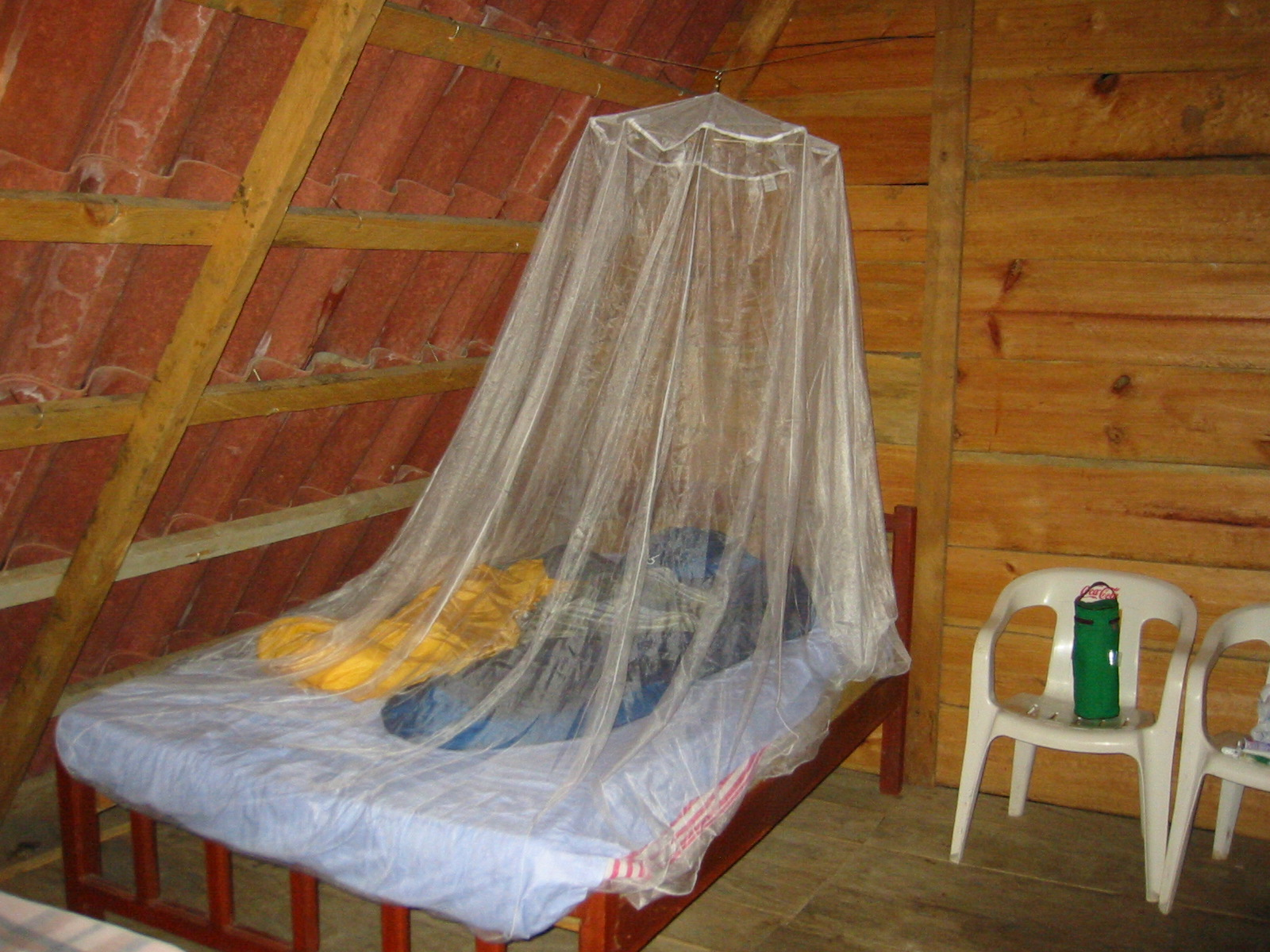
Low-cost, ceiling-hung mosquito netting for a bed

Many of the guidelines for preventing occupational West Nile virus exposure are common to all mosquito-borne diseases.

Public health measures include taking steps to reduce mosquito populations. Personal recommendations are to reduce the likelihood of being bitten. General measures to avoid bites include:

- Using insect repellent on exposed skin to repel mosquitoes. Repellents include products containing DEET and picaridin. DEET concentrations of 30% to 50% are effective for several hours. Picaridin, available at 7% and 15% concentrations, needs more frequent application. DEET formulations as high as 30% are recommended for children over two months of age. The CDC also recommends the use of: IR3535, oil of lemon eucalyptus, para-menthane-diol, or 2-undecanone. Protect infants less than two months of age by using a carrier draped with mosquito netting with an elastic edge for a tight fit.
- When using sunscreen, apply sunscreen first and then repellent. Repellent should be washed off at the end of the day before going to bed.
- Wear long-sleeve shirts, which should be tucked in, long trousers, socks, and hats to cover exposed skin (although most fabrics do not totally protect against bites). Insect repellents should be applied over top of protective clothing for greater protection. Do not apply insect repellents underneath clothing.
- Repellents containing permethrin (e.g., Permanone) or other insect repellents may be applied to clothing, shoes, tents, mosquito nets, and other gear. (Permethrin is not suitable for use directly on skin.) Most repellent is generally removed from clothing and gear by a single washing, but permethrin-treated clothing is effective for up to five washings.
- Most mosquitoes that transmit disease are most active at dawn and in the evening dusk. A notable exception is the Asian tiger mosquito, which is a daytime feeder and is more apt to be found in, or on the periphery of, shaded areas with heavy vegetation. They are now widespread in the United States, and in Florida they have been found in all 67 counties.
- In an at-risk area, staying in air-conditioned or well-screened room, or sleeping under an insecticide-treated bed net is recommended. Bed nets should be tucked under mattresses, and can be sprayed with a repellent if not already treated with an insecticide.

=== Monitoring and control ===
West Nile virus can be sampled from the environment by the pooling of trapped mosquitoes via carbon dioxide-baited light traps or testing blood samples drawn from chickens and horses found by various animal control agencies and the public.

Testing of the mosquito samples requires the use of reverse-transcriptase PCR (RT-PCR) to directly amplify and show the presence of virus in the submitted samples. When using the blood sera of wild birds and sentinel chickens, samples must be tested for the presence of WNV antibodies by use of immunohistochemistry (IHC) or enzyme-linked immunosorbent assay (ELISA).Dead birds, after necropsy, or their oral swab samples collected on specific RNA-preserving filter paper card, can have their virus presence tested by either RT-PCR or IHC, where virus shows up as brown-stained tissue because of a substrate-enzyme reaction.

West Nile control is achieved through mosquito control, by elimination of mosquito breeding sites such as abandoned pools, applying larvacide to active breeding areas, and targeting the adult population via lethal ovitraps and aerial spraying of pesticides. With aerial pesticides, there is a rising need to develop new versions as pesticide resistance among mosquitoes can occur.

Environmentalists have condemned attempts to control the transmitting mosquitoes by spraying pesticide, saying the detrimental health effects of spraying outweigh the relatively few lives that may be saved, and more environmentally friendly ways of controlling mosquitoes are available. They also question the effectiveness of insecticide spraying, as they believe mosquitoes that are resting or flying above the level of spraying will not be killed; the most common vector in the northeastern United States, Culex pipiens, is a canopy feeder.

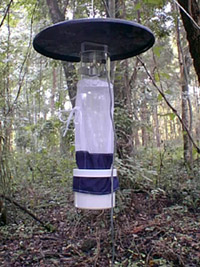
A carbon dioxide-baited CDC light trap at NPSmonitoring site: The highest individual light trap total for 2010 was from a trap located in a salt marsh in the Fire Island National Seashore: around 25,142 mosquitoes were collected during a 16-hour period on August 31.

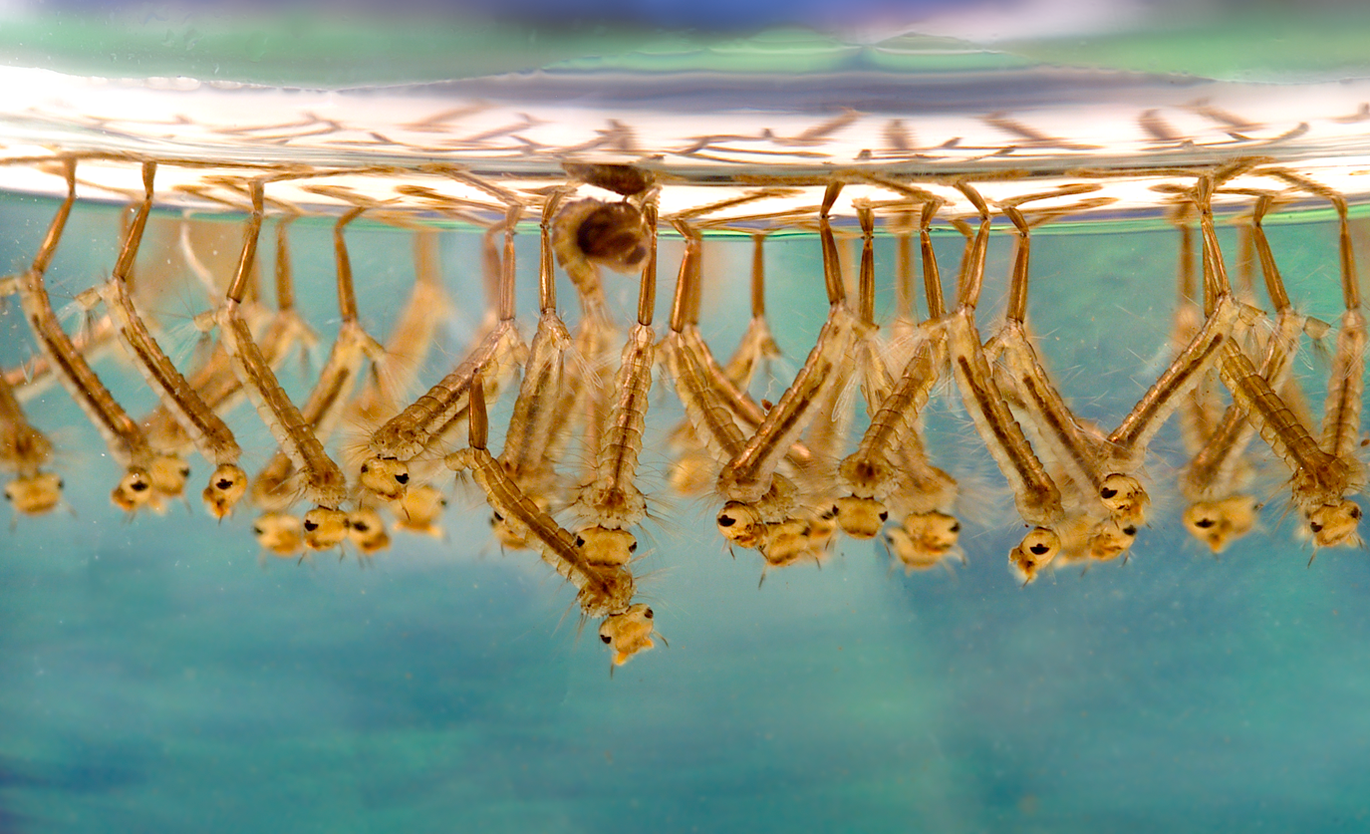
Eggs of permanent water mosquitoes can hatch, and the larvae survive, in only a few ounces of water. Less than half the amount that may collect in a discarded coffee cup. Floodwater species lay their eggs on wet soil or other moist surfaces. Hatch time is variable for both types; under favorable circumstances (such as warm weather), the eggs of some species may hatch in as few as 1–3 days after being laid.

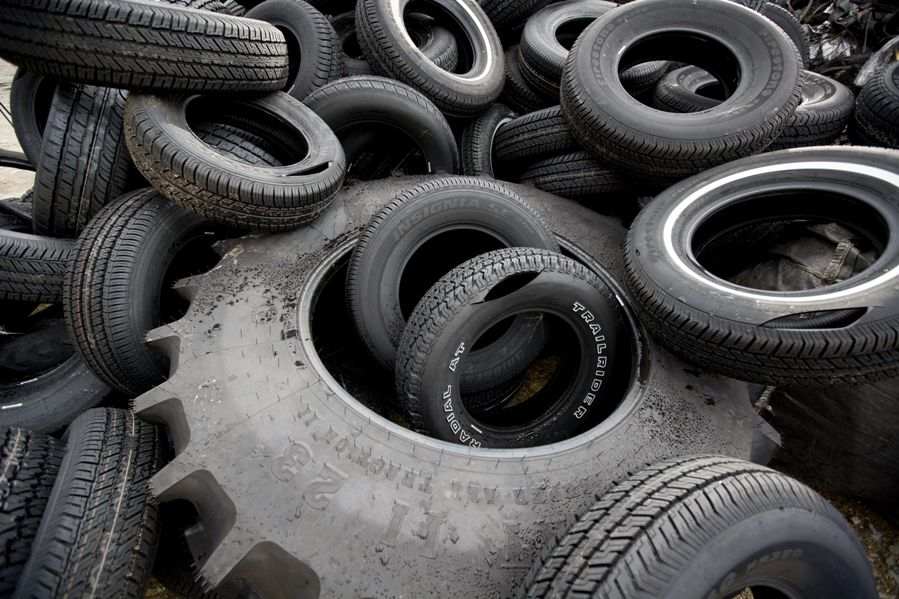
Used tires often hold stagnant water and are a breeding ground for many species of mosquitoes. Some species such as the Asian tiger mosquito prefer manmade containers, such as tires, in which to lay their eggs. The rapid spread of this aggressive daytime feeding species beyond their native range has been attributed to the used tire trade.

== Treatment ==
No specific treatment is available for WNV infection. Most people recover without treatment. In mild cases, over-the-counter pain relievers can help ease mild headaches and muscle aches in adults. In severe cases supportive care is provided, often in hospital, with intravenous fluids, pain medication, respiratory support, and prevention of secondary infections.

== Prognosis ==
While the general prognosis is favorable, current studies indicate that West Nile fever can often be more severe than previously recognized, with studies of various recent outbreaks indicating that it may take as long as 60 to 90 days to recover. Patients with milder WNF are just as likely as those with more severe manifestations of neuroinvasive disease to experience multiple somatic complaints such as tremor, and dysfunction in motor skills and executive functions for over a year. People with milder symptoms are just as likely as people with more severe symptoms to experience adverse outcomes. Recovery is marked by a long convalescence with fatigue. One study found that neuroinvasive WNV infection was associated with an increased risk for subsequent kidney disease.

== Epidemiology ==
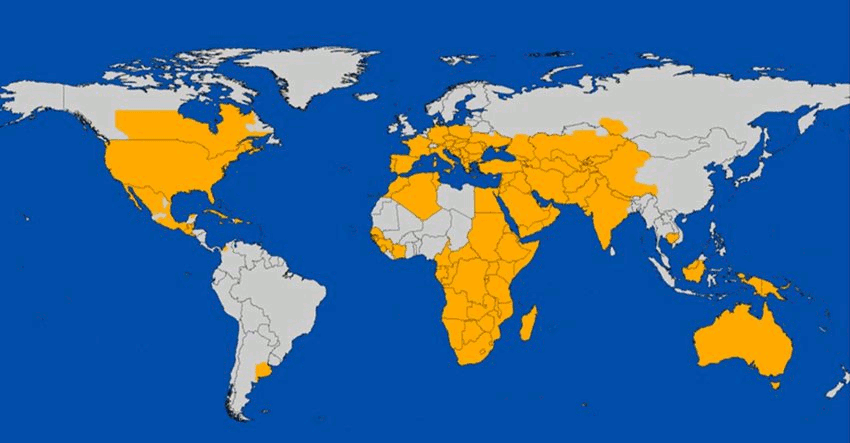
Global distribution of West Nile virus (2006)

WNV was first isolated from a feverish 37-year-old woman at Omogo in the West Nile District of Uganda in 1937 during research on yellow fever virus. A series of serosurveys in 1939 in central Africa found anti-WNV positive results ranging from 1.4% (Congo) to 46.4% (White Nile region, Sudan). It was subsequently identified in Egypt (1942) and India (1953), a 1950 serosurvey in Egypt found 90% of those over 40 years in age had WNV antibodies. The ecology was characterized in 1953 with studies in Egypt and Israel. The virus became recognized as a cause of severe human meningoencephalitis in elderly patients during an outbreak in Israel in 1957. The disease was first noted in horses in Egypt and France in the early 1960s and found to be widespread in southern Europe, southwest Asia and Australia.

The first appearance of WNV in the Western Hemisphere was in 1999 with encephalitis reported in humans, dogs, cats, and horses, and the subsequent spread in the United States may be an important milestone in the evolving history of this virus. The American outbreak began in College Point, Queens in New York City and was later spread to the neighboring states of New Jersey and Connecticut. The virus is believed to have entered in an infected bird or mosquito, although there is no clear evidence. West Nile virus is now endemic in Africa, Europe, the Middle East, west and central Asia, Oceania (subtype Kunjin), and most recently, North America and is spreading into Central and South America.Outbreaks of West Nile virus encephalitis in humans have occurred in Algeria (1994), Romania (1996 to 1997), the Czech Republic (1997), Congo (1998), Russia (1999), the United States (1999 to 2009), Canada (1999–2007), Israel (2000), Greece (2010), and Israel (2024).

Epizootics of disease in horses occurred in Morocco (1996), Italy (1998), the United States (1999 to 2001), and France (2000), Mexico (2003) and Sardinia (2011).

In August 2024 in Warsaw the West Nile virus was identified in bodies of dead birds (Corvidae) while investigating an unusually high number of finds.Outdoor workers (including biological fieldworkers, construction workers, farmers, landscapers, and painters), healthcare personnel, and laboratory personnel who perform necropsies on animals are at risk of contracting WNV.In 2012, the US experienced one of its worst epidemics in which 286 people died, with the state of Texas being hard hit by this virus.

=== Weather ===
Drought has been associated with a higher number of West Nile virus cases in the following year. As drought can decrease fish and other populations that eat mosquito eggs, higher numbers of mosquitoes can result. Higher temperatures are linked to decreased time for replication and increased viral load in birds and mosquitoes.

== Research ==
A vaccine for horses (ATCvet code: QI05AA10 (WHO)) based on killed viruses exists; some zoos have given this vaccine to their birds, although its effectiveness is unknown. Dogs and cats show few if any signs of infection. There have been no known cases of direct canine-human or feline-human transmission; although these pets can become infected, it is unlikely they are, in turn, capable of infecting native mosquitoes and thus continuing the disease cycle. AMD3100, which had been proposed as an antiretroviral drug for HIV, has shown promise against West Nile encephalitis. Morpholino antisense oligos conjugated to cell penetrating peptides have been shown to partially protect mice from WNV disease. There have also been attempts to treat infections using ribavirin, intravenous immunoglobulin, or alpha interferon. GenoMed, a U.S. biotech company, has found that blocking angiotensin II can treat the "cytokine storm" of West Nile virus encephalitis as well as other viruses.

As of 2019, six vaccines had progressed to human trials but none had been licensed in the United States. Only the two live attenuated vaccines produced strong immunity after a single dose.

Dr. Anthony Fauci, former director of the National Institute of Allergy and Infectious Diseases, has urged proactive action, including international collaborations for vaccine and antiviral development, emphasizing that we must not wait for a greater crisis to address this virus. His call for increased public awareness and scientific research followed his own recovery as a victim of the West Nile virus, which he most likely contracted in his Washington, D.C.–based backyard from a mosquito bite.
