= Keldur =

Historic village in South Iceland

Coordinates: 63°49′19″N 20°4′26″W

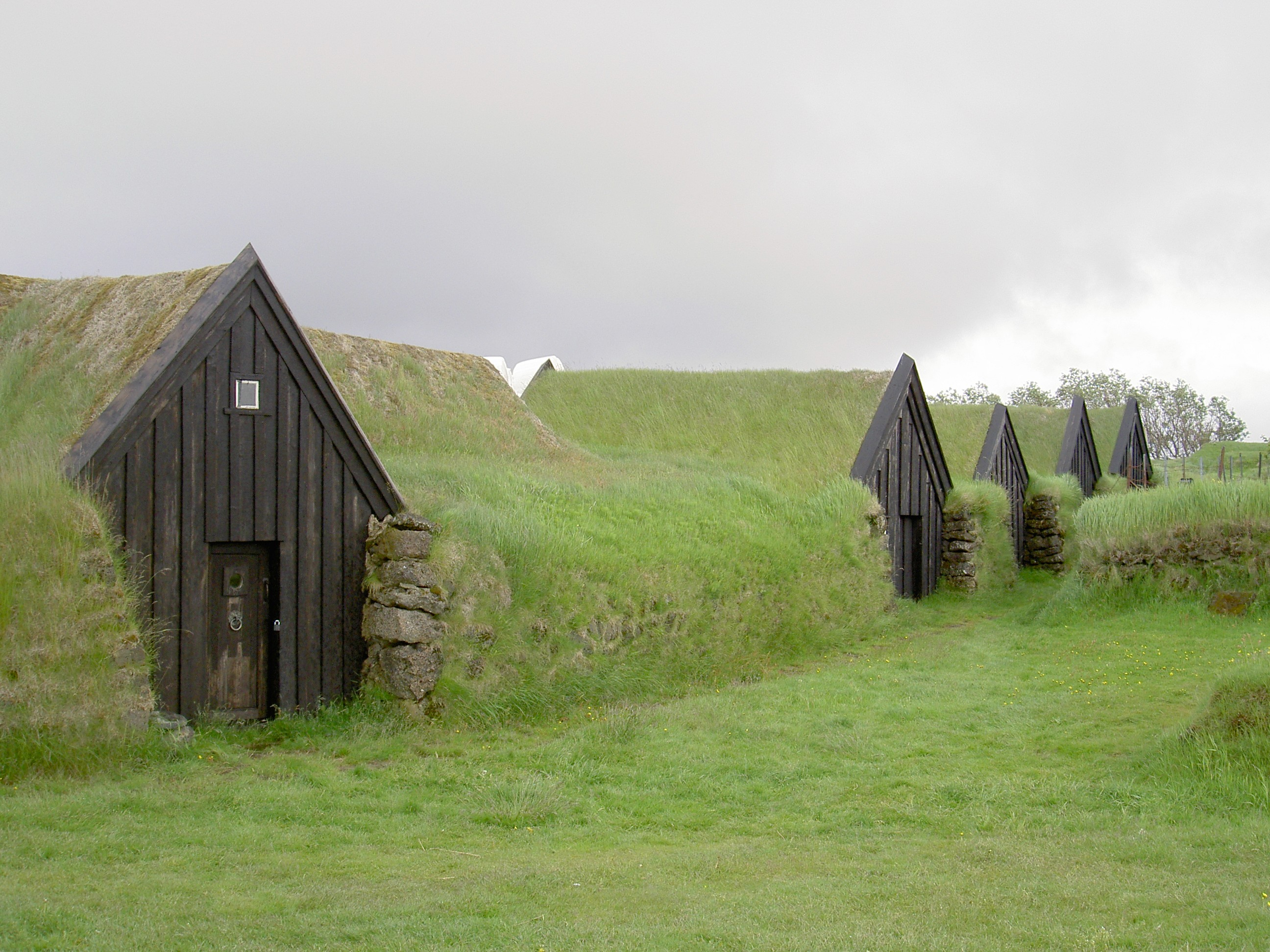
A row of turf houses in the village

Keldur is a village in Rangárvellir on Iceland in the region of Suðurland. In the village there is an old manor house and the ruins of an old residence. In the manor, inhabited until 1946, there are some 20 buildings. To the north of the village is the Hekla volcano.

On 18 December 2001 the village was placed on Iceland's tentative world heritage list for its traditional turf-covered houses. On 7 February 2011 Iceland updated the list, placing Keldur on the tentative world heritage turf house tradition list.

== History ==
The first known farmer at Keldur was Ingjaldur Höskuldsson; he is mentioned in the 13th century Njal's saga. The farm later became the residence of the Oddaverjar chieftains. The chief Jón Loftsson lived here and is believed to be buried in the village. In the 13th century, the chieftain Hálfdan Sæmundsson, grandson of Jón, and his wife Steinvör Sighvatsdóttir lived at Keldur.

The foundation of the residential building in Keldur is considered to be from the 11th century. The house is today the oldest in Iceland. The residence is now a museum. From the residential building, an old underground passage leads to the farm stream, which was rediscovered during an archaeological excavation in 1998. Such passages, called jarðhus, are mentioned in the Icelandic sagas.

In the past, the land north of Keldur was an overgrown area with several farms now buried in the black lava sand. The area was overgrown until the middle of the 19th century when the sand took over. The sand is believed to have arisen in connection with the eruption of Hekla in 1511. When the thick layer of pumice settled after the volcanic eruption, south and southwest of Hekla, sand began to blow through wind erosion towards Rangárvellir and the village of Keldur.

There has been a church in Keldur from the earliest times, and served from Odda. The current log church, called Keldnakirkja in Icelandic, was built in 1875.

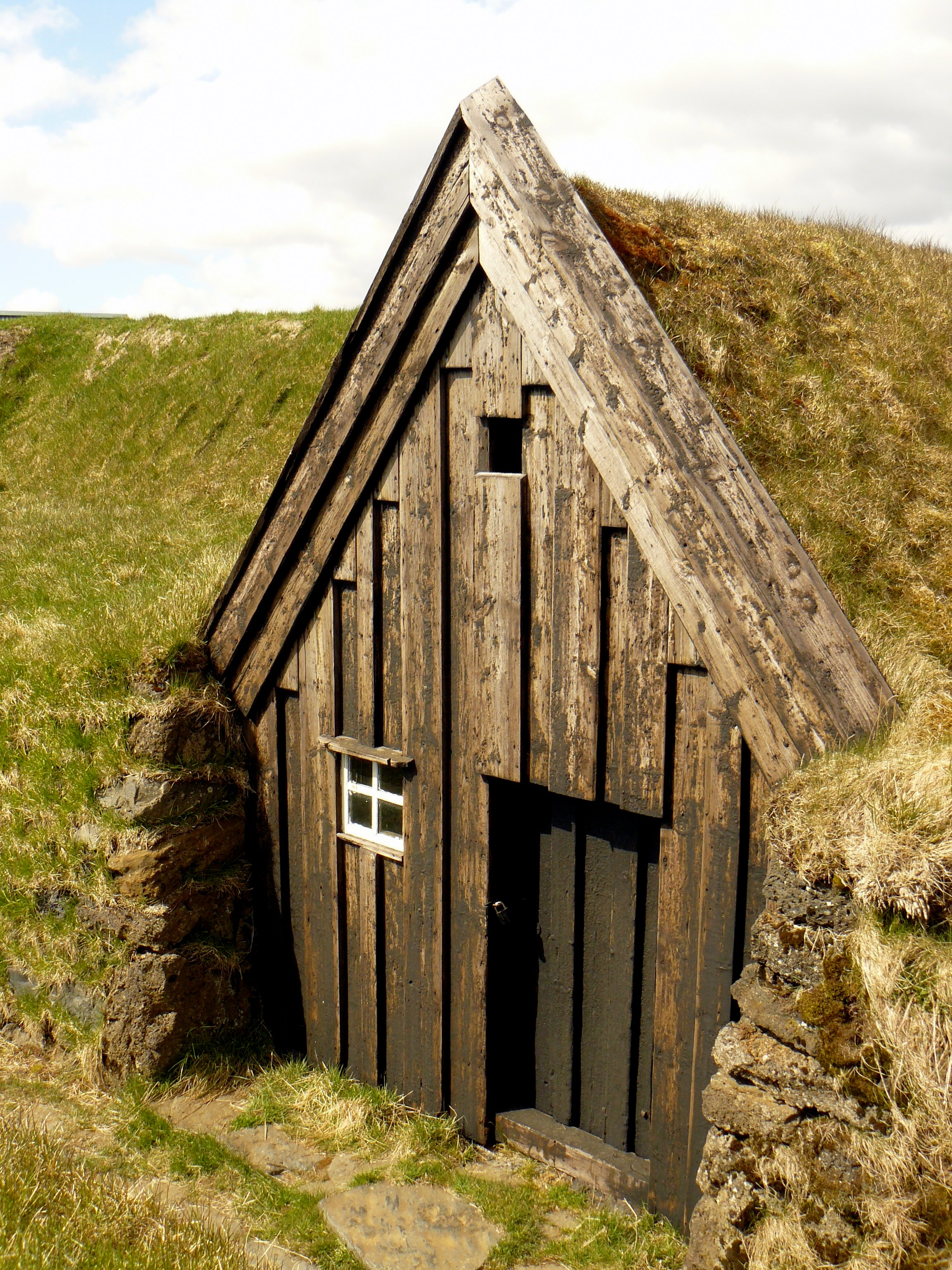
Gable end of one of the turf houses

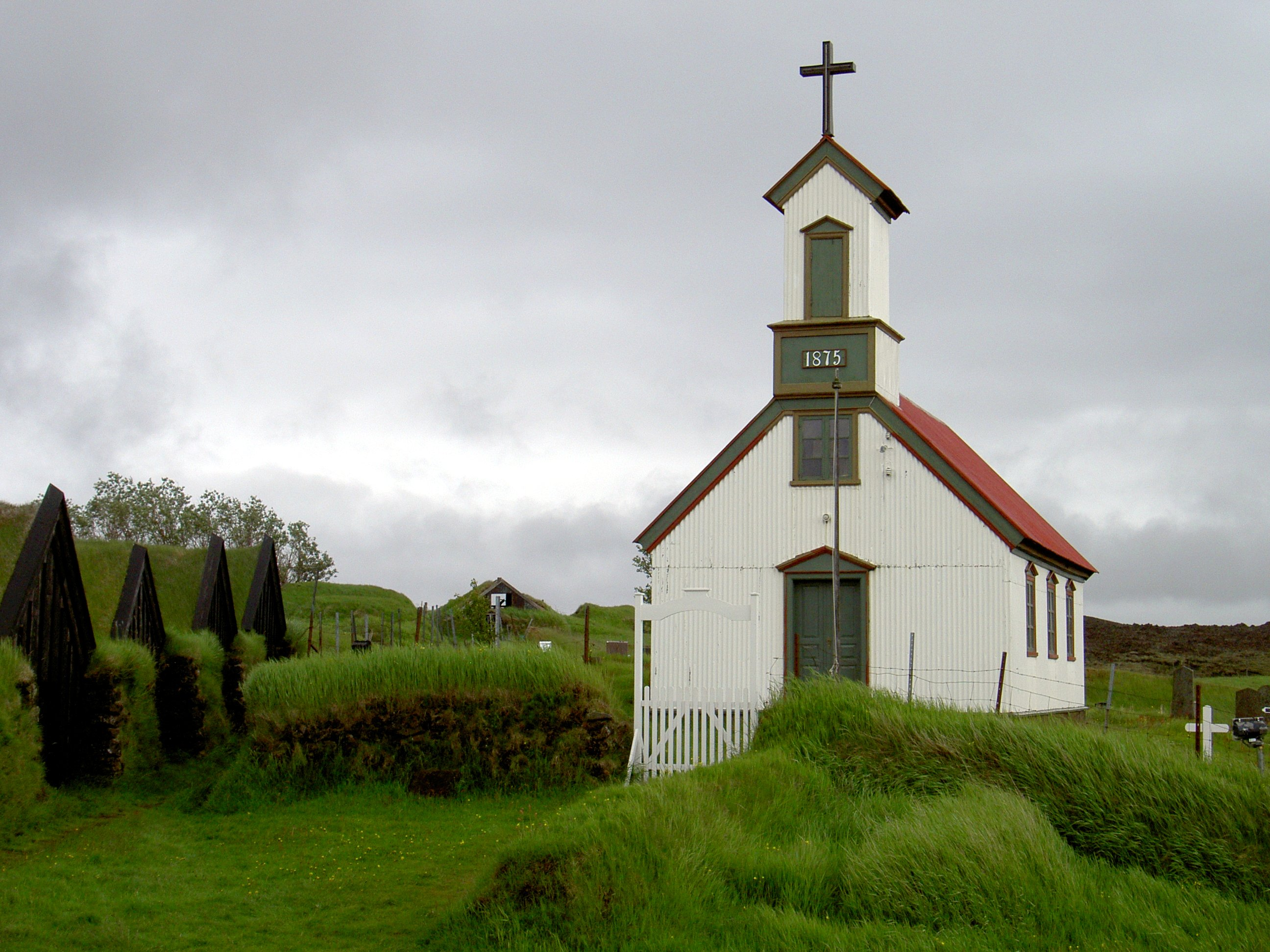
The Keldnakirkja church. Gables of turf houses in the village can be seen on the left.
