= Viremia =

Presence of virus in the blood

- Other names: Viraemia
- Specialty: Infectious disease

Viremia (/ˈvaɪˈriːmiə/) is a medical condition where viruses enter the bloodstream and hence have access to the rest of the body. It is similar to bacteremia, a condition where bacteria enter the bloodstream. The name comes from combining the word "virus" with the Greek word for "blood" (haima). It usually lasts for 4 to 5 days in the primary condition.

== Primary versus secondary ==
Primary viremia refers to the initial spread of virus in the blood from the first site of infection. Secondary viremia occurs when primary viremia has resulted in infection of additional tissues via bloodstream, in which the virus has replicated and once more entered the circulation.

Usually secondary viremia results in higher viral shedding and viral loads within the bloodstream due to the possibility that the virus is able to reach its natural host cell from the bloodstream and replicate more efficiently than the initial site. An excellent example to profile this distinction is the rabies virus. Usually the virus will replicate briefly within the first site of infection, within the muscle tissues. Viral replication then leads to viremia and the virus spreads to its secondary site of infection, the central nervous system (CNS). Upon infection of the CNS, secondary viremia results and symptoms usually begin.

== Active versus passive ==
Active viremia is caused by the replication of viruses which results in viruses being introduced into the bloodstream. Examples include the measles, in which primary viremia occurs in the epithelial lining of the respiratory tract before replicating and budding out of the cell basal layer (viral shedding), resulting in viruses budding into capillaries and blood vessels.

Passive viremia is the introduction of viruses in the bloodstream without the need of active viral replication. Examples include direct inoculation from mosquitoes, through physical breaches or via blood transfusions.

== See also ==
- Septicemia
