= Emerging infectious disease =

New or rapidly increasing disease

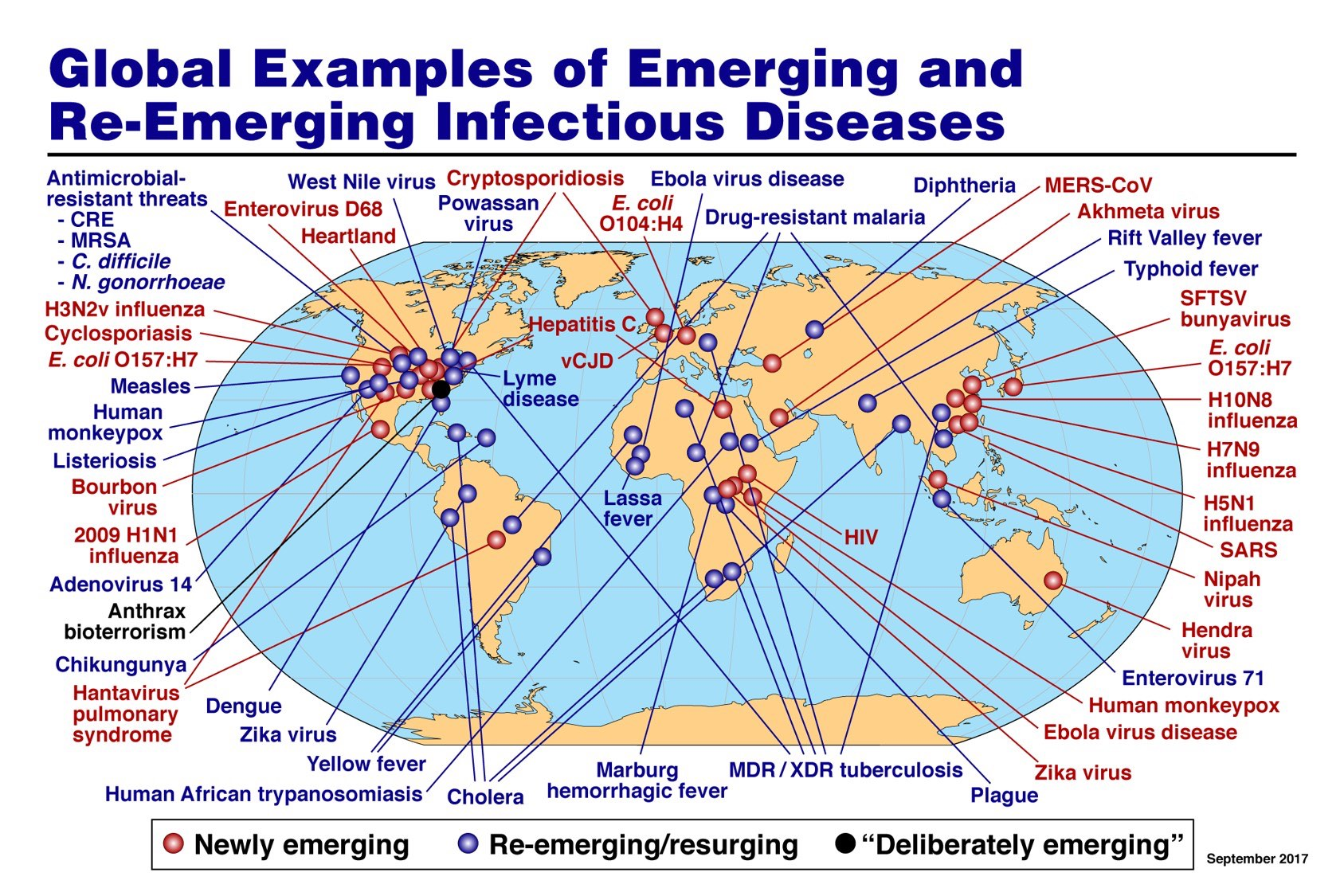
When Anthony Fauci became director of the NIAID, he drew a map of the world for presentation at a congressional hearing that showed a single notable emerging infectious disease threat: HIV. Since then, he has continually updated the map, now showing the emergence of numerous infectious disease threats to illustrate the experiences of his years in office as well as highlighting certain infections that had emerged before HIV.

An emerging infectious disease (EID) refer to infectious diseases that have either newly appeared in a population or have existed but are rapidly increasing in incidence, geographic range, or severity due to factors such as environmental changes, antimicrobial resistance, and human-animal interactions. The minority that are capable of developing efficient transmission between humans can become major public and global concerns as potential causes of epidemics or pandemics. Their many impacts can be economic and societal, as well as clinical. EIDs have been increasing steadily since at least 1940.

For every decade since 1940, there has been a consistent increase in the number of EID events from wildlife-related zoonosis. Human activity is the primary driver of this increase, with loss of biodiversity a leading mechanism.

Emerging infections account for at least 12% of all human pathogens. EIDs can be caused by newly identified microbes, including novel species or strains of virus (e.g. novel coronaviruses, ebolaviruses, HIV). Some EIDs evolve from a known pathogen, as occurs with new strains of influenza. EIDs may also result from spread of an existing disease to a new population in a different geographic region, as occurs with West Nile fever outbreaks. Some known diseases can also emerge in areas undergoing ecologic transformation (as in the case of Lyme disease). Others can experience a resurgence as a re-emerging infectious disease, like tuberculosis (following drug resistance) or measles. Nosocomial (hospital-acquired) infections, such as methicillin-resistant Staphylococcus aureus are emerging in hospitals, and are extremely problematic in that they are resistant to many antibiotics. Of growing concern are adverse synergistic interactions between emerging diseases and other infectious and non-infectious conditions leading to the development of novel syndemics.

Many EID are zoonotic, deriving from pathogens present in animals, with only occasional cross-species transmission into human populations. For instance, most emergent viruses are zoonotic (whereas other novel viruses may have been circulating in the species without being recognized, as occurred with hepatitis C).

== History of the concept of emerging infectious diseases ==
The French doctor Charles Anglada (1809–1878) wrote a book in 1869 on extinct and new diseases. He did not distinguish infectious diseases from others (he uses the terms reactive and affective diseases, to mean diseases with an external or internal cause, more or less meaning diseases with or without an observable external cause). He writes in the introduction:

A widely held opinion among physicians admits the invariability of pathologies. All the illnesses which have existed or which have an outbreak around us are categorized according to arrested and preconceived types, and must enter one way or the other into the frameworks established by the nosologists. History and observation protest wildly against this prejudice, and this is what they teach: Diseases which have disappeared and whose traces are confined to the archives of science, are followed by other diseases, unknown to the contemporary generation, and which come for the first time to assert their rights. In other words, there are extinct and new diseases.

Charles Nicolle, laureate of the Nobel Prize in Physiology or Medicine elaborated the concept of emergence of diseases in his 1930 book Naissance, vie et mort des maladies infectieuses (Birth, Life and Death of Infectious Diseases), and later in Destin des maladies infectieuses (Fate of Infectious Diseases) published in 1933 which served as lecture notes for his teaching of a second year course at the Collège de France. In the introduction of the book he sets out the program of the lectures:

It is this historical existence, this destiny that will be the subject of our talks. I will have to answer, to the extent that our current knowledge allows, questions that you have asked yourself, that every thoughtful or simply curious mind asks: have the infectious diseases that we observe today always existed? Or have some of them appeared in the course of history? Can we assume that new ones will appear? Can we assume that some of these diseases will disappear? Have some of them already disappeared? Finally, what will become of humanity and domestic animals if, as a result of more and more frequent contacts between people, the number of infectious diseases continues to increase?

The term emerging disease has been in use in scientific publications since the beginning of the 1960s at least and is used in the modern sense by David Sencer in his 1971 article "Emerging Diseases of Man and Animals" where in the first sentence of the introduction he implicitly defines emerging diseases as "infectious diseases of man and animals currently emerging as public health problems" and as a consequence also includes re-emerging diseases:

Infectious diseases of man and animals currently emerging as public health problems include some old acquaintances and some that are new in respect to identity or concept.

He also notes that some infectious agents are newly considered as diseases because of changing medical technologies:

But there are also many familiar organisms formerly considered nonpathogenic that are now associated with nosocomial infections, use of artificial kidneys, and the acceptance or rejection of organ transplants, for example.

He concludes the introduction with a word of caution:

And so infectious disease, one of man's oldest enemies, survives as an adversary that calls forth our best efforts.

However, to many people in the 1960s and 1970s the emergence of new diseases appeared as a marginal problem, as illustrated by the introduction to the 1962 edition of Natural History of Infectious Disease by Macfarlane Burnet:

to write about infectious disease is almost to write of something that has passed into history

as well as the epilogue of the 1972 edition:

On the basis of what has happened in the last thirty years, can we forecast any likely developments for the 1970s? If for the present we retain a basic optimism and assume no major catastrophes occur [...] the most likely forecast about the future of infectious disease is that it will be very dull. There may be some wholly unexpected emergence of a new and dangerous infectious disease, but nothing of the sort has marked the past fifty years.

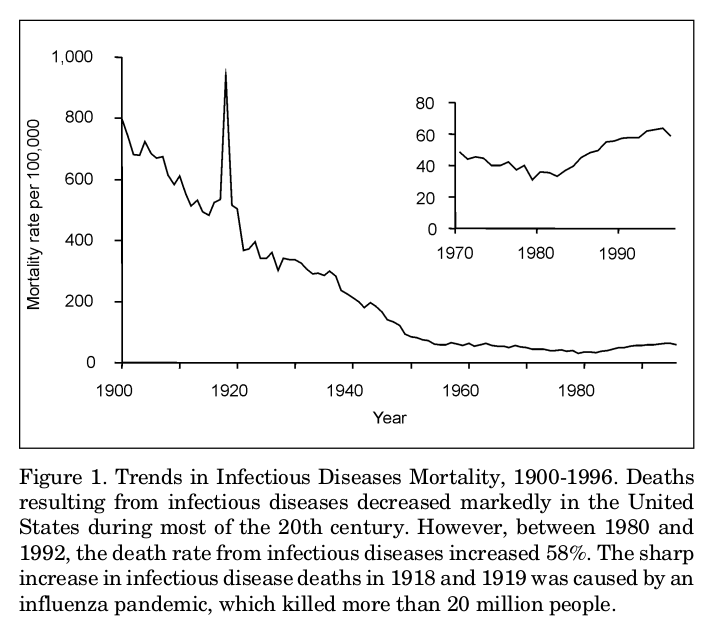
Throughout the 20th century until 1980, with the exception of the 1918 Spanish flu pandemic, the death rate from infectious diseases in the United States was steadily decreasing. However, because of the AIDS epidemic, the death rate from infectious diseases increased by 58% between 1980 and 1992.

The concept gained more interest at the end of the 1980s as a reaction to the AIDS epidemic. On the side of epistemology, Mirko Grmek worked on the concept of emerging diseases while writing his book on the history of AIDS and later in 1993 published an article about the concept of emerging disease as a more precise notion than the term "new disease" that was mostly used in France at that time to qualify AIDS among others.

Also under the shock of the emergence of AIDS, epidemiologists wanted to take a more active approach to anticipate and prevent the emergence of new diseases. Stephen S. Morse from The Rockefeller University in New York was chair and principal organizer of the NIAID/NIH Conference "Emerging Viruses: The Evolution of Viruses and Viral Diseases" held 1–3 May 1989 in Washington, DC. In the article summarizing the conference the authors write:

Challenged by the sudden appearance of AIDS as a major public health crisis [...] jointly sponsored the conference "Emerging Viruses: The Evolution of Viruses and Viral Diseases" [...] It was convened to consider the mechanisms of viral emergence and possible strategies for anticipating, detecting, and preventing the emergence of new viral diseases in the future.

They further note:

Surprisingly, most emergent viruses are zoonotic, with natural animal reservoirs a more frequent source of new viruses than is the sudden evolution of a new entity. The most frequent factor in emergence is human behavior that increases the probability of transfer of viruses from their endogenous animal hosts to man.

In a 1991 paper Morse underlines how the emergence of new infectious diseases (of which the public became aware through the AIDS epidemic) is the opposite of the then generally expected retreat of these diseases:

The striking successes achieved with antibiotics, together with widespread application of vaccines for many previously feared viral diseases, made it appear to many physicians and the public that infectious diseases were retreating and would in time be fully conquered. Although this view was disputed by virologists and many specialists in infectious diseases, it had become a commonplace to suggest that infectious diseases were about to become a thing of the past [...].

As a direct consequence of the 1989 conference on emerging viruses, the Institute Of Medicine convened in February 1991 the 19-member multidisciplinary Committee on Emerging Microbial Threats to Health, co-chaired by Joshua Lederberg and Robert Shope, to conduct an 18-month study. According to the report produced by the committee in 1992, its charge "was to identify significant emerging infectious diseases, determine what might be done to deal with them, and recommend how similar future threats might be confronted to lessen their impact on public health." The report recommended setting up a surveillance program to recognize emerging diseases and proposed methods of intervention in case an emergent disease was discovered.

A well-designed, well-implemented surveillance program can detect unusual clusters of disease, document the geographic and demographic spread of an outbreak, and estimate the magnitude of the problem. It can also help to describe the natural history of a disease, identify factors responsible for emergence, facilitate laboratory and epidemiological research, and assess the success of specific intervention efforts.

The proposed interventions were based on the following: the U.S. public health system, research and training, vaccine and drug development, vector control, public education and behavioral change. A few years after the 1989 Emerging Viruses conference and the 1992 IOM report, the Program for Monitoring Emerging Diseases (ProMED) was formed by a group of scientists as a follow-up in 1994 and the Centres for Disease Control (CDC) launched the Emerging Infectious Diseases journal in 1995.

A decade later the IOM convened the Committee on Emerging Microbial Threats to Health in the 21st Century which published its conclusions in 2003.

In April 2000 the WHO organized a meeting on Global Outbreak Alert and Response, which was the founding act of the Global Outbreak Alert and Response Network.

In 2014, the Western African Ebola virus epidemic demonstrated how ill-prepared the world was to handle such an epidemic. In response, the Coalition for Epidemic Preparedness Innovation was launched at the World Economic Forum in 2017 with the objective of accelerating the development of vaccines against emerging infectious diseases to be able to offer them to affected populations during outbreaks. CEPI promotes the idea that a proactive approach is required to "create a world in which epidemics are no longer a threat to humanity".

== Classification ==
One way to classify emerging infections diseases is by time and how humans were involved in the emergence:

- Newly emerging infectious diseases – diseases that were not previously described in humans, such as SARS-CoV-2 (COVID-19) and MERS
- Re-emerging infectious diseases – diseases that have spread to new places or which previous treatments no longer control, such as methicillin-resistant Staphylococcus aureus, tuberculosis (due to drug resistance, measles (due to declining vaccination rates), and cholera (due to climate-related factors)
- Deliberately emerging infectious diseases – diseases created by humans for bioterrorism, such as bioterrorism-related agents like anthrax and smallpox
- Accidentally emerging infectious diseases – diseases created or spread unintentionally by humans, such as vaccine-derived poliovirus

== Contributing factors ==
The 1992 IOM report distinguished six factors contributing to emergence of new diseases (Microbial adaptation and change; Economic development and land use; Human demographics and behavior; International travel and commerce; Technology and industry; Breakdown of public health measures) which were extended to 13 factors in the 2003 report (Chapter 3 of the report detailing each of them):

- Microbial adaptation and change
- Human susceptibility to infection
- Climate and weather
- Changing ecosystems
- Human demographics and behavior
- Economic development and land use
- International travel and commerce
- Technology and industry
- Breakdown of public health measures
- Poverty and social inequality
- War and famine
- Lack of political will
- Intent to harm

Their classification serves as a basis for many others. The following table gives examples for different factors:

Factor of emergence	Example
Microbial adaption	Genetic drift and genetic shift in Influenza A
Changing human susceptibility	Mass immunocompromisation with HIV/AIDS
Climate change	Diseases transmitted by animal vectors such as mosquitoes (e.g. West Nile fever or dengue) are moving further from the tropics as the climate warms. By increasing the range of these animal vectors, the diseases are appearing in previously unaffected regions.
Changes in human demographics and travel facilitating rapid global spread	Globalization and travel facilitates the rapid spread of pathogens, ex SARS-related coronaviruses
Economic development	Use of antibiotics to increase meat yield of farmed cows leads to antibiotic resistance
War and famine	Clearing of animal habitats that increase the range of diseases such as ebola
Inadequate public health services	
Poverty and social inequality	Tuberculosis is primarily a problem in low-income areas
Bioterrorism	2001 Anthrax attacks
Land use	Dam construction and irrigation systems can encourage malaria and other mosquito-borne diseases Use of indiscriminate pesticides in industrial farming reduces/eliminates biological controls (e.g. dragonflies, amphibians, insectivorous birds, spiders) of known disease vectors (e.g. mosquito, tick, biting midge). Deforestation and habitat destruction increase human exposure to zoonotic pathogens, Nipah virus which is linked to bat-to-human transmission.
Anti-vaccination or Vaccine hesitancy	Re-emergence of measles
Wildlife trade	Has been linked to zoonotic emergence and spread of new infectious diseases in humans, including Nipah virus and COVID-19. Crowded and unhygienic wet markets and wildlife farms have been implicated in animal-human transmission of emergent viruses, including novel coronaviruses and influenza viruses Complex issues surrounding the commerce and consumption of bushmeat are also of particular concern.

== List ==
=== NIAID list of Biodefense and Emerging Infectious Diseases ===
The U.S. National Institute of Allergy and Infectious Diseases (NIAID) maintains a list of Biodefense and Emerging Infectious Diseases. The list is categorized by biodefense risk, which is mostly based on biological warfare and bioterrorism considerations. As of 2004, it recognized the following emerging and re-emerging diseases.

Newly recognized (since the 1980s):
- Acanthamebiasis
- Australian bat lyssavirus
- Babesia, atypical
- Bartonella henselae
- Coronaviruses, including SARS coronavirus
- Ehrlichiosis
- Encephalitozoon cuniculi
- Encephalitozoon hellem
- Enterocytozoon bieneusi
- Helicobacter pylori
- Hendra virus (equine morbilli virus)
- Hepatitis C
- Hepatitis E
- Human herpesvirus 8
- Human herpesvirus 6
- Lyme borreliosis
- Microsporidia
- Parvovirus B19

Re-emerging:

- Coccidioides immitis
- Enterovirus 71
- Prion diseases
- Streptococcus, group A
- Staphylococcus aureus

Diseases with bioterrorism potential, CDC category A (most dangerous):

- Anthrax
- Clostridium botulinum
- Tularemia
- Smallpox and other pox viruses
- Viral hemorrhagic fevers
  - Arenaviruses: Lymphocytic choriomeningitis (LCM), Junin virus, Machupo virus, Guanarito virus, Lassa fever
  - Bunyaviruses: Hantaviruses, Rift Valley Fever, Crimean-Congo hemorrhagic fever virus
  - Flaviviruses: Dengue
  - Filoviruses: Ebola, Marburg
- Yersinia pestis

Diseases with bioterrorism potential, CDC category B:

- Brucella species (brucellosis)
- Burkholderia pseudomallei (melioidosis)
- Burkholderia mallei (glanders)
- Coxiella burnetii (Q fever)
- Epsilon toxin of Clostridium perfringens
- Food-borne and Water-borne Pathogens
  - Bacteria
    - Campylobacter jejuni
    - Diarrheagenic E. coli
    - Listeria monocytogenes
    - Pathogenic vibrios
    - Salmonella
    - Shigella species
    - Yersinia enterocolitica
  - Protozoa
    - Cryptosporidium parvum
    - Cyclospora cayetanensis
    - Entamoeba histolytica
    - Giardia lamblia
    - Toxoplasma
  - Fungi
    - Microsporidia
  - Viruses:
    - Caliciviruses
    - Hepatitis A
- Mosquito-borne encephalitis viruses
  - California encephalitis
  - Eastern equine encephalitis (EEE)
  - Japanese encephalitis virus (JE)
  - Kyasanur Forest virus
  - LaCrosse virus (LACV)
  - Venezuelan equine encephalitis (VEE)
  - Western equine encephalitis (WEE)
  - West Nile virus (WNV)
  - Yellow fever
- Ricin toxin (from Ricinus communis)
- Staphylococcal enterotoxin B
- Typhus fever (Rickettsia prowazekii)

Diseases with bioterrorism potential, CDC category C (least dangerous):

- Influenza
- Multidrug-resistant tuberculosis (MDR-TB)
- Nipah virus
- Rabies
- SARS coronavirus
- Tick-borne encephalitis virus
- Tick-borne hemorrhagic fever viruses
- Other hantaviruses
- Other rickettsias

Since 2004, NIAID has added to its biodefense emerging pathogen list:

- Yersinia pestis (plague, category A)
- Chapare virus (category A areanavirus)
- Lujo (category A arenavirus)
- Chlamydia psittaci (category B)
- Naegleria fowleri (category B)
- Balamuthia mandrillaris (category B)
- St. Louis encephalitis virus (SLEV, category B)
- Tick-borne hemorrhagic fever viruses (category C)
  - Bunyaviruses: Severe Fever with Thrombocytopenia Syndrome virus (SFTSV), Heartland virus
  - Flaviviruses: Omsk Hemorrhagic Fever virus, Alkhurma virus, Kyasanur Forest virus (reclassified from B to C)
- Powassan virus (Deer Tick virus, category C)
- Chikungunya virus (category B)
- Coccidioides species (category C)
- Human coronavirus HKU1 (category C)
- Middle East respiratory syndrome coronavirus (category C)
- Anaplasmosis
- Aspergillus
- BK virus
- Bordetella pertussis
- Borrelia miyamotoi
- Clostridioides difficile
- Cryptococcus gattii
- Enterococcus faecium
- Enterococcus faecalis
- Enterovirus 68
- JC virus
- Leptospirosis
- Measles
- Mucormycosis
- Mumps virus
- Poliovirus
- Zika virus (category B)
NIAID also monitors antibiotic resistance, which can become an emerging threat for many pathogens.

=== WHO list of most important emerging infectious diseases ===
In December 2015, the World Health Organization held a workshop on prioritization of pathogens "for accelerated R&D for severe emerging diseases with potential to generate a public health emergency, and for which no, or insufficient, preventive and curative solutions exist." The result was a list containing the following six diseases:

- Crimean–Congo hemorrhagic fever
- Filovirus diseases (Ebola virus disease and Marburg virus disease)
- Highly pathogenic emerging Coronaviruses relevant to humans (MERS and SARS)
- Lassa fever
- Nipah virus infection
- Rift Valley fever

These were selected based on the following measures:

1. Human transmissibility (including population immunity, behavioural factors, etc.)
2. Severity or case fatality rate
3. Spillover potential
4. Evolutionary potential
5. Available countermeasures
6. Difficulty of detection or control
7. Public health context of the affected area(s)
8. Potential scope of outbreak (risk of international spread)
9. Potential societal impacts

=== Newly reported infectious diseases ===
In 2007 Mark Woolhouse and Eleanor Gaunt established a list of 87 human pathogens first reported in the period between 1980 and 2005. These were classified according to their types.

Numbers of pathogen species by taxonomic category
	Number of species known in 2005	Number of species reported from 1980 to 2005
TOTAL	1399	87
Bacteria	541	11
Fungi	325	13
Helminths	285	1
Prions	2	1
Protozoa	57	3
Viruses	189	58
DNA viruses	36	9
RNA viruses	153	49

=== Major outbreaks ===
The following table summarizes the major outbreaks since 1998 caused by emerging or re-emerging infectious diseases.

Disease	Country or region	Year of start of outbreak
Ngari virus	Kenya, Tanzania, Somalia	1998
Nipah virus	Malaysia	1998
West Nile virus	US	1999
Itaya virus	Peru	1999
Rift Valley fever	Saudi Arabia and Yemen	2000
EBLV-2	Scotland	2002
SARS-CoV		2002
Influenza A virus subtype H7N2		2002
Monkeypox	US	2003
Chapare virus	Bolivia	2003
Plague	Algeria	2003
HTLV-3, HTLV-4	Cameroon	2005
Melaka virus	Malaysia	2006
LuJo virus	southern Africa	2008
Multi-drug resistant P. falciparum	South-East Asia	2008
Candida auris		2009
Heartland virus	US	2009
Bas-Congo virus	DRC	2009
Lassa fever	Mali	2009
Pandemic H1N1/09 virus	Global pandemic	2009
Huaiyangshan banyangvirus		2009
Plague	Libya	2009
Cholera	Haiti	2010
Lassa fever	Ghana	2011
Plasmodium cynomolgi	Malaysia	2011
H3N2v		2011
MERS -CoV		2012
Mojiang paramyxovirus		2012
H7N9		2013
Sosuga pararubulavirus		2013
H10N8		2013
Chikungunya	Caribbean	2013
Variegated Squirrel Bornavirus 1		2013
Colpodella sp. Heilongjiang	China	2013
Ebola virus disease	West Africa	2014
H5N6		2014
Lassa fever	Benin	2014
Bourbon virus	US	2014
Zika virus	Americas	2015
Crimean–Congo hemorrhagic fever	Spain	2016
Chikungunya	Pakistan	2016
Lassa fever	Togo	2016
Ntwetwe virus	Uganda	2016
Monkeypox	Nigeria	2017
Yellow fever	Brazil	2017
Rat hepatitis E virus		2017
Guinea worm	Chad	2018
Lyme disease		2018
H7N4		2018
Monkeypox	Liberia, UK	2018
Nipah virus	India	2018
COVID-19	Global pandemic	2019

== Methicillin-resistant Staphylococcus aureus ==
Methicillin-resistant Staphylococcus aureus (MRSA) evolved from methicillin-susceptible Staphylococcus aureus (MSSA), otherwise known as common S. aureus. Many people are natural carriers of S. aureus, without being affected in any way. Infections occur in healthcare settings (Healthcare acquired-MRSA) and in the community (Community acquired-MRSA), often leading to severe skin infections, pneumonia, and bloodstream infections. Community-acquired MRSA, is increasingly found in healthy individuals such as athletes, prisoners, and schoolchildren outside of hospital settings. MSSA was treatable with the antibiotic methicillin until it acquired the gene for antibiotic resistance. MRSA is a major public health threat due to its resistance to antibiotics. Through genetic mapping of various strains of MRSA, scientists have found that MSSA acquired the mecA gene in the 1960s, which accounts for its pathogenicity, before this it had a predominantly commensal relationship with humans. It is theorized that when this S. aureus strain that had acquired the mecA gene was introduced into hospitals, it came into contact with other hospital bacteria that had already been exposed to high levels of antibiotics. When exposed to such high levels of antibiotics, the hospital bacteria suddenly found themselves in an environment that had a high level of selection for antibiotic resistance, and thus resistance to multiple antibiotics formed within these hospital populations. When S. aureus came into contact with these populations, the multiple genes that code for antibiotic resistance to different drugs were then acquired by MRSA, making it nearly impossible to control. It is thought that MSSA acquired the resistance gene through the horizontal gene transfer, a method in which genetic information can be passed within a generation, and spread rapidly through its own population as was illustrated in multiple studies. Horizontal gene transfer speeds the process of genetic transfer since there is no need to wait an entire generation time for gene to be passed on. Since most antibiotics do not work on MRSA, physicians have to turn to alternative methods based in Darwinian medicine. Efforts to combat MRSA include improved tracking, enhanced hospital hygiene protocols to reduce healthcare-associated infections, and development of new antimicrobial agents and alternative therapies, such as bacteriophage therapy. However, prevention is the most preferred method of avoiding antibiotic resistance.

== Scientific Advisory Group for Origins of Novel Pathogens ==
On 16 July 2021, the Director-General of WHO announced the formation of the Scientific Advisory Group for Origins of Novel Pathogens (SAGO), which is to be a permanent advisory body of the organisation. The Group was formed with a broad objective to examine emerging infectious diseases, including COVID-19. The group's primary objective is to provide scientific guidance on identifying the origins of emerging pathogens, including SARS-CoV-2. The group has also recommended enhanced global surveillance systems. According to the WHO Director-General, "SAGO will play a vital role in the next phase of studies into the origins of SARS-CoV-2, as well as the origins of future new pathogens."

== See also ==
- Climate change and infectious diseases
- Disease X
- Epidemiological transition
- Globalization and disease
- Pandemic prevention
