= 1998–1999 Malaysia Nipah virus outbreak =

Disease outbreak in Malaysia

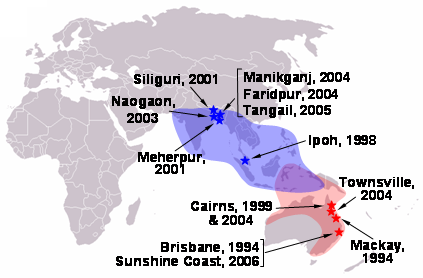
- The first site of the virus in Ipoh in 1998 and later occurrence to other places with the virus extent in blue while Hendra virus in red, both belong to the Paramyxoviridae family.

- The 1998–1999 Nipah virus outbreak areas in West Malaysia, blue is the origin source of the virus while the red are further affected areas.
- Disease: Nipah virus infection
- Pathogen: Nipah virus
- First outbreak: Ipoh, Perak
- Index case: September 1998
- Confirmed cases: 265
- Deaths: 105

The 1998–1999 Malaysia Nipah virus outbreak occurred from September 1998 to May 1999 in the states of Perak, Negeri Sembilan and Selangor in Malaysia. A total of 265 cases of acute encephalitis with 105 deaths caused by the virus were reported in the three states throughout the outbreak. At first, the Malaysian health authorities thought that Japanese encephalitis (JE) was the cause of the infection. This misunderstanding hampered the deployment of effective measures to prevent the spread, before the disease was identified by a local virologist from the Faculty of Medicine, University of Malaya as a newly discovered agent. It was named Nipah virus (NiV). The disease was as deadly as the Ebola virus disease (EVD), but attacked the brain system instead of the blood vessels. University of Malaya's Faculty of Medicine and the University of Malaya Medical Centre played a major role in serving as a major referral centre for the outbreak, treating majority of the Nipah patients and was instrumental in isolating the novel virus and researched on its features.

This emerging disease caused major losses to both animal and human lives, affecting livestock trade. It also created a significant setback to the swine sector of the animal industry in Malaysia. The country became the origin of the virus, but had no more cases since 1999. Further outbreaks continue to occur in Bangladesh and India.

== Background ==
The virus firstly struck pig-farms in the suburb of Ipoh in Perak with the occurrence of respiratory illness and encephalitis among the pigs, where it was initially believed to have been caused by Japanese encephalitis (JE), due to four serum samples from 28 infected humans in the area which tested positive for JE-specific Immunoglobulin M (IgM) which is also confirmed by the findings of the World Health Organization (WHO) Collaborating Centre for Tropical Disease at Nagasaki University. A total of 15 infected people died during the ensuing outbreak, before the virus began to spread into Sikamat, Nipah River Village and Pelandok Hill in Negeri Sembilan, when farmers impacted by the control measures began to sell their infected pigs to these areas. This resulted 180 patients infected by the virus and 89 deaths. With further movement of infected pigs, more cases emerged from around Sepang District and Sungai Buloh in Selangor, with 11 cases and 1 death reported among abattoir workers in Singapore who had handled the infected pigs imported from Malaysia.

== Response and further investigation ==
Since the cause was initially wrongly identified, early control measures such as mosquito foggings and vaccination of pigs against JE were deployed to the affected area, which proved to be ineffective, with more cases emerging despite these early measures. With the increasing deaths reported from the outbreak, this caused nationwide fear from the public and the near-collapse of the local pig-farming industry. Most healthcare workers who were taking care of their infected patients had been convinced that the outbreak was not caused by JE, since the disease affected more adults than children, including those who had been vaccinated earlier against JE. Through further autopsies on the victims, the findings were inconsistent with the earlier results, and suggested it may have come from another agent. This was supported by several findings, including that all of the infected people had had direct physical contact with pigs, and all of the infected pigs had developed severe symptoms of a "barking cough" before dying. Despite the evidence gathered from autopsy results, with new findings among local researchers, the federal government, especially the health authorities, insisted that it was solely caused by JE, which delayed further appropriate action taken for outbreak control.

=== Identification of the source of infection ===
In early March 1999, a local medical virologist at the University of Malaya finally found the root cause of the infection. The infection was found to be caused by a new agent named Nipah virus (NiV), taken from the investigation area name of Nipah River Village (Malay: Kampung Sungai Nipah), where it was unknown in available scientific records at the time. The virus origin was determined to be from a native fruit bat species. Together with the Hendra virus (HeV), the novel virus was subsequently recognised as a new genus, Henipavirus (Hendra + Nipah) in the Paramyxoviridae family. NiV and HeV shared enough epitopes for HeV antigens to be used in a prototype serological test for NiV antibodies which helped in the subsequent screening and diagnosis of NiV infection. Following the findings, widespread surveillance of pig populations, together with the culling of over a million pigs was undertaken, and the last human fatality occurred on 27 May 1999. The outbreak in neighbouring Singapore also ended with immediate prohibition of pig importation to the country and the subsequent closure of abattoirs. The virus discovery received the attention from the American Centers for Disease Control and Prevention (CDC), Commonwealth Scientific and Industrial Research Organisation (CSIRO) and Singapore General Hospital (SGH) which gave swift assistance towards the characterisation of the virus and the development of surveillance and control measures.

== Aftermath ==
Until the 2010s, the pig farming ban on Pelandok Hill was still in force to prevent the recurrence of the outbreak, despite some farmers having quietly restarted their businesses after being encouraged by community leaders. Most of the surviving pig farmers have turned to palm oil and Artocarpus integer (cempedak) cultivation. Since the virus has been named Nipah from the sample taken in Nipah River Village of Pelandok Hill, the latter area has become synonyms with the deadly virus.

In a response from the Singapore's government, its country's food agency, Agri-Food and Veterinary Authority of Singapore (now Singapore Food Agency (SFA)), banned the exports of pig blood curd in 1999. The ban has since been lifted after 27 years on 1 April 2026, with the pig blood curd imports from Thailand requiring approval from SFA beforehand. Before the ban was lifted, one seller was prosecuted for selling imported pig blood curd online in 2021.

== See also ==
- Paramyxoviridae
