= Jacob Vadakkanchery =

Indian alternative medicine activist

Jacob Vadakkanchery is a naturopath, Gandhian, yogi and social worker based in Kerala, India. He is the former chairman of Nature Life International which has several nature cure hospitals across Kerala. He is known for campaigning against liquor shops, junk foods, chemical-based farming methods, preventive medicines, and vaccination. He has authored four books about naturopathy and lifestyle. He has been arrested for pseudo-treatments and for spreading false information about leptospirosis and Nipah virus.

== Naturopath ==
Vadakkanchery has been active in promoting naturopathy. He advises people to go back to a raw fruit- and vegetable-based diet and to avoid all types of processed foods (including packaged foods, sugar, salt, and simple carbohydrates), yoga, cleansing, water anema, mud packs in order to improve health.

He frequently uses the prefix 'Dr.' with his name, but he has never claimed that he has a medical degree or a doctorate which allows him to use the prefix. Freethinkers forum filed a case against him in 2016 for using 'Dr' prefix with his name He claims that he uses the 'Dr.' title under his own volition, because he has been called so by other people. He continues to use 'Dr.' title despite being reprimanded by Kerala government.

He has also been conducting a 7-day course titled "You too can become a doctor", focusing on naturopathic ways to heal diseases. He has openly challenged doctors to inject the HIV virus into him and claimed to give a remuneration if they could successfully cause the infection on him. He rejects the scientific principle that microorganisms can cause diseases.

In 2018 Shobhit University India confirm him with Honorary Professorship of KSV Medical College of Naturopathy and Yogic Sciences, Gangoh.

== Nature Life International ==
Jacob Vadakkanchery founded Nature Life International in 1998. They now have several nature cure hospitals across Kerala. Patients are advised a naturopathic lifestyle and diet, chemical free foods, and natural methods of treatment at these centers. They also sell several products via these centers and via their website.

Jacob Vadakkanchery resigned as chairman of Nature Life International in May 2018 after cases were registered against him for allegedly spreading lies regarding Nipah virus.

In January 2018 Nature Life Hospital in Kochi was asked to pay a fine of Rs. 4 Lakhs by the Consumer Disputes Redressal Forum for gross negligence for the death of a lawyer Vinayanandan that happened in this center in 2005. The forum president Rose Jose in her order said that though the direct cause of the death was not because of the treatment at hospital there was gross negligence in giving care and attention to the patient. The forum took into consideration the submission of the hospital and Vadakkanchery that the relatives had not shown the ECG report of Vinayanandan at the time of admission indicating that the deceased was a heart patient.

== Activism ==
Vadakkanchery has in the past run several campaigns against liquor shops and chemical based farming.

He also regularly campaigns against preventive medicines and vaccines which has resulted in many cases being filed and getting him arrested several times During the public health crisis of Nipah virus infection in Kerala, he claimed that Nipah virus does not exist, and that the disease is a creation of the "medical mafia". He said that fruit bats, the primary reservoir of Nipah virus, eat only fruits and therefore cannot harbour viruses. He asked people to refrain from eating previously cooked meat to avoid spreading of fever instead of going to the hospital. He also challenged the public to visit the Nipah affected area of Perambra. He expressed confidence that no naturopath has yet been killed by Nipah.

According to Vadakkanchery, vaccination is a part of the 'medical propaganda'. He claims that vaccines have been made from aborted fetus and therefore should not be administered to children. His public talks have been alleged to be a reason for reduced vaccination rates, which eventually caused the diphtheria outbreak in the Malappuram district of Kerala.

Vadakkanchery has campaigned against the state government program for prevention of leptospirosis during the public health crisis after 2018 floods in Kerala. He alleged that doxycycline, the medicine used for prevention and treatment of leptospirosis would cause fatal allergic reaction. He proclaimed that pharma companies were using leptospirosis scare to increase the sale of their medicines, and therefore, one should resort to naturopathic ways of treatment. He was then arrested by police for spreading misinformation against public health campaigns, following a written complaint from the health minister.

== Publications ==
Vadakkanchery is the author of book AIDS: English Marunninte Rogam Pentagoninte(English translation: AIDS: disease created by English medicines, weapon used by Pentagon. The book back cover describes AIDS as a lie spread by the American government.
