= SFTS =

SFTS may refer to:

- San Francisco Theological Seminary, a graduate school affiliated with Presbyterian Church (U.S.A.) located in San Anselmo, California
- Severe fever with thrombocytopenia syndrome, an infectious disease caused by SFTS virus
