= West Nile virus in the United States =

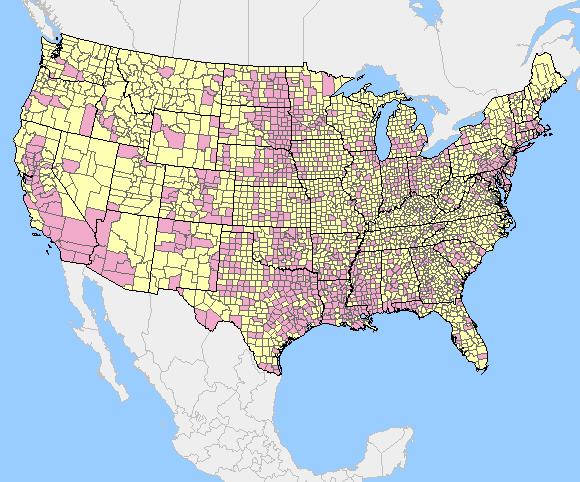
USGS map of the United States showing reported cases of West Nile virus infection by county in 2012. Cumulative total of the entire country: 1,590 cases. (Current as of Aug 28, 2012).

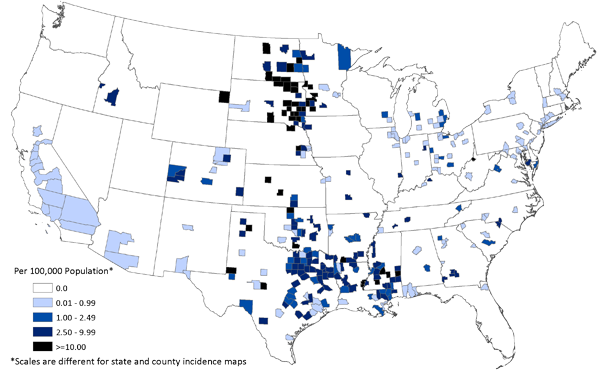
U.S. West Nile virus (WNV) neuroinvasive disease incidence as of Sep 4, 2012

The West Nile virus quickly spread across the United States after the first reported cases in Queens, New York, in 1999. The virus is believed to have entered in an infected bird or mosquito, although there is no clear evidence. The disease spread quickly through infected birds. Mosquitoes spread the disease to mammals. It was mainly noted in horses but also appeared in a number of other species. The first human cases usually followed within three months of the first appearance of infected birds in the area except where cold weather interrupted the mosquito vectors. Since the virus has become widely established in the U.S., an average of 130 deaths a year have occurred.

Differences in surveillance and reporting between health departments and generally increased surveillance as the disease spread cause some problems in direct comparison of the number of cases and the mortality rate. The reported number of infected in 2009 was 720, but the estimated total number of infected the same year was 54,000. The true mortality rate is thought to be much lower because most cases are so mild they go undiagnosed. Some estimates put severe cases at only 1% of all cases. It is believed that the elderly or people with weak immune systems are most vulnerable to serious illness or death if bitten by a mosquito infected by West Nile. Most mild cases go undiagnosed. In addition, some more severe but non-neuroinvasive cases are not reported to the CDC. Some mild cases are discovered during blood donation screening. Between 2003 and mid-2005, 1,039 West Nile-tainted blood donations were discovered. Thirty cases of West Nile from blood transfusion were known, the majority from 2002 before blood screening was instituted.

In the first ten years since the virus arrived in the U.S., over 1,100 deaths occurred with human cases reported from every U.S. state except Maine, Alaska and Hawaii. (Animal cases have been occasionally found in Maine and in Puerto Rico.) In 2012, there was a widespread outbreak with the highest death toll and second-highest total case numbers. Maine and Puerto Rico reported one case each, the first time the disease was reported in those places.

== Discovery in the United States ==
In August 1999, the New York State Department of Environmental Conservation (NYSDEC) began receiving reports of large die-offs of crows in parks across New York City. On August 9, dead wild crows were discovered outside both the Queens Zoo and the Bronx Zoo, prompting head pathologist Tracey McNamara to begin investigating what was going on. At the same time, Dr. Deborah Asnis, an infectious disease specialist at Flushing Hospital Medical Center in Queens, noticed two male patients who were suffering from similar, unusual symptoms. The two patients, aged 60 and 75 respectively, were exhibiting sudden paralysis in their arms and legs, as well as disorientation and high fevers. Lab testing also showed elevated numbers of white blood cells within the spinal fluid of both males. Neither of the patients were responding to antiviral drugs. Possible early hypotheses included botulism, viral encephalitis, Guillain–Barré syndrome, or meningitis, but none of these illnesses exactly matched the symptoms. Asnis decided to pursue a more concrete diagnosis by contacting authorities and other colleagues.

Dr. Asnis contacted Dr. Marcelle Layton, the New York City Department of Health's chief epidemiologist, on Monday, August 23, 1999, to report her patients' symptoms. Layton advised Asnis to send samples of the patients' blood and spinal fluid to the New York State Department of Health in Albany for further analysis. Around the same time, Dr. McNamara identified a potential viral encephalitis in brain tissue from the dead crows and sent samples off for further testing. Meanwhile, by Friday, August 27, just four days after Asnis had contacted Layton, two additional patients had been identified in Queens. The number rose to eight by Sunday, August 29, at Flushing Hospital Medical Center and other hospitals in Queens. All of the early patients resided within a few miles of one another. They were also frequent gardeners in the evenings.

The Centers for Disease Control and Prevention (C.D.C.) initially identified the mystery illness as St. Louis encephalitis on September 3, 1999. The city of New York began widespread spraying for mosquitos later that same day.

On September 9, Dr. McNamara contacted the C.D.C. with concerns that the epidemiologic pattern of this outbreak were not consistent with St. Louis encephalitis, which does not cause bird die-offs. Additionally, she reported that other known avian viral diseases would have resulted in the deaths of other bird species in the zoos (avian influenza and Newcastle disease would have killed chickens in the petting zoo and eastern equine encephalitis would have killed emus on exhibit). Since only corvids appeared to be dying, she suggested the possibility of a novel pathogen. The C.D.C. disagreed that the epidemiologic pattern was inconsistent and declined to test tissue samples from animal species. Instead, Dr. McNamara sent tissue samples to the National Veterinary Services Laboratory. On September 11, they reported that the samples she submitted were positive for a flavivirus, marking the first time a virus in this genus was implicated in an animal disease.

The U.S. federal government eventually revised its diagnosis from St. Louis encephalitis to West Nile virus on September 27, 1999, based on research by Dr. Duane J. Gubler, a C.D.C. expert on arborviruses, and their own testing on samples submitted by Dr. McNamara.

Both Dr. McNamara and Dr. Asnis have been credited by health experts with the early identification of West Nile virus in the United States. Their actions likely prevented a more widespread outbreak. In their 2003 book, The New Killer Diseases: How the Alarming Evolution of Germs Threatens Us All, authors Elinor Levy and Mark Fischetti praised Dr. Asnis' response to the symptoms, writing that, "Asnis did something other doctors might not have bothered to do." They elaborated that, "One of the worst problems with our disease-detection system is that many doctors never report cases of strange symptoms, either because they are unsure of the disease they are facing, they're ignorant of the reporting requirement, or they simply never get around to it. Deborah Asnis was highly conscientious."

== Recent cases ==
During the years between 1999 and 2010, an estimate of 3 million people have been infected in the United States. Highest incidence rates are observed in states of the central great plains, with South Dakota, Wyoming and North Dakota leading in incidence.

During the 2012 West Nile virus outbreak in Texas, 1,868 cases were reported. Male patients, persons >65 years of age, and minorities were at highest risk for neuroinvasive disease. At total of 1,868 cases including 844 (45%) WNND (West Nile neuroinvasive disease) cases and 89 deaths (case-fatality rate 5%). Dates of onset ranged from May 1, 2012, through December 6, 2012. The outbreak peaked during week 33 (mid-August) with 225 reported cases, which is historically the same peak for all reported WNV cases in Texas during 2002–2011. The median time from date of symptom onset to date of official report to TxDSHS was 27 days (range 6–274 days). Of the 254 counties in Texas, 135 (53%) reported a WNV case. The overall incidence rate for the state was 7.8 cases per 100,000 population. Almost half of the cases were reported from the northeastern quadrant of the state, including the Dallas/Fort Worth metroplex (902 [48%] cases): Dallas (396 [21%]), Tarrant (259 [14%]), Collin (64 [3%]), and Denton (183 [10%]) counties. These 4 counties had a combined incidence rate of 16 cases per 100,000 population.

In 2026, California, Utah and Texas are experiencing an unusually active West Nile virus season, with potential to be the worst in 20 years. Increasing numbers of infected mosquito pools and birds, also early human cases, suggest higher transmission rates. To lower infection, researchers suggest the mosquito breeding sites, such as standing water, and using inspect repellant, to reduce infection.

== Cases ==
	Cases	Deaths	Mortality Rate of reported cases
1999	62	7	11%
2000	21	2	10%
2001	66	10	15%
2002	4,156	284	7%
2003	9,862	264	3%
2004	2,539	100	4%
2005	3,000	119	4%
2006	4,269	177	4%
2007	3,623	124	3%
2008	1,356	44	3%
2009	720	32	4%
2010	1,021	57	6%
2011	712	43	6%
2012	5,674	286	5%
2013	2,469	119	5%
2014	2,205	97	4%
2015	2,175	146	7%
2016	2,149	106	5%
2017	2,097	146	7%
2018	2,647	167	6%
2019*	971	60	6%
2020**	731	66	9%
2021	2,911	227	8%
2022	1,126	90	8%

Sources: Final Cumulative Maps & Data for 1999–2018, Preliminary Maps & Data for 2019, and West Nile Virus Disease Cases by State 2020, Centers for Disease Control and Prevention

*2019 also had 104 presumptive cases observed in blood donors

** as of December 15, 2020, also 127 presumptive cases observed in blood donors

== Maps of progression ==
The following maps show the progress of human cases of West Nile across the United States. States are colored according to the percentage of all U.S. West Nile cases they represented in that year. Zero percent (no cases) is colored white; less than 1% is blue; between 1% and 5% is green; between 5% and 10% is yellow, and greater than 10% of cases in a year is red.

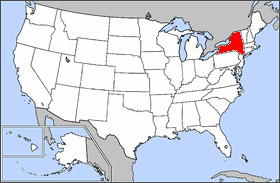
1999

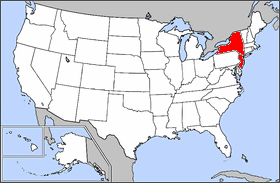
2000

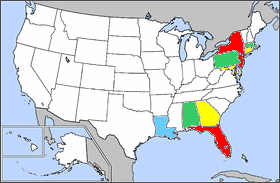
2001

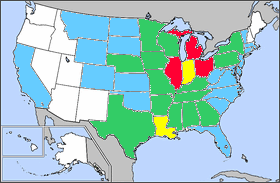
2002

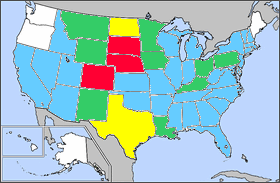
2003

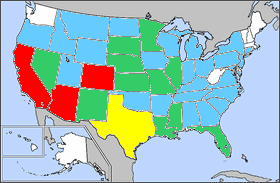
2004

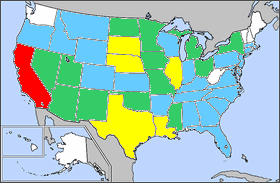
2005

== Counties of reported cases by year ==
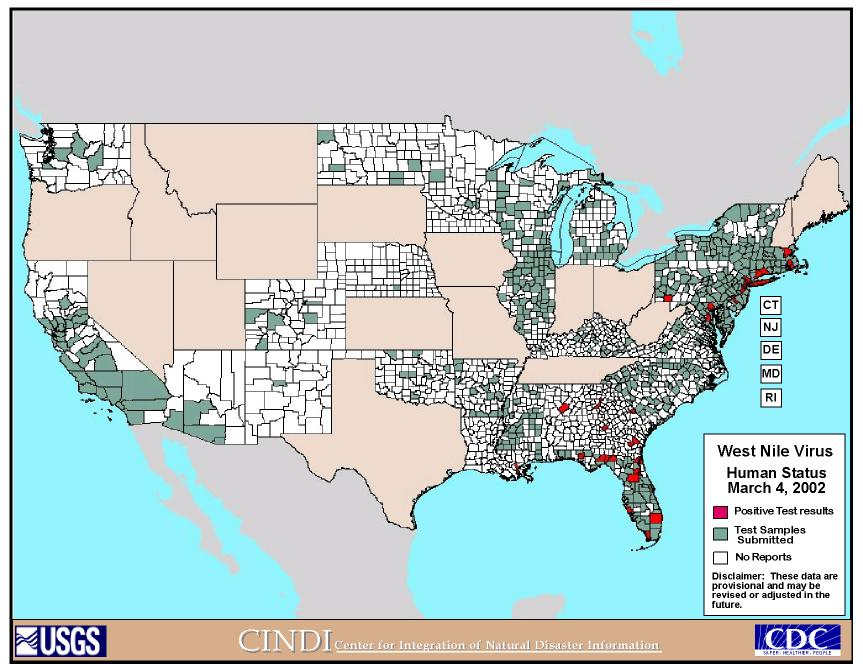
2001

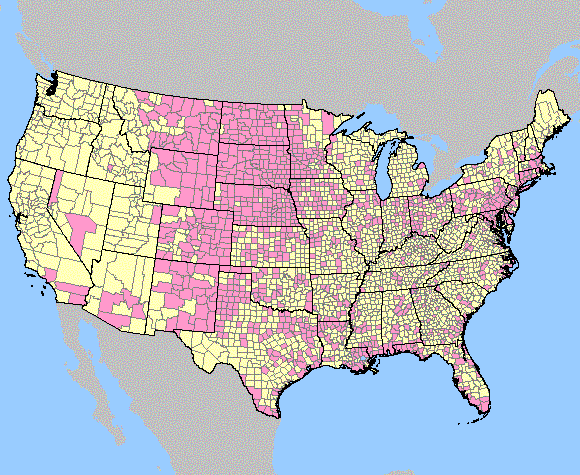
2002

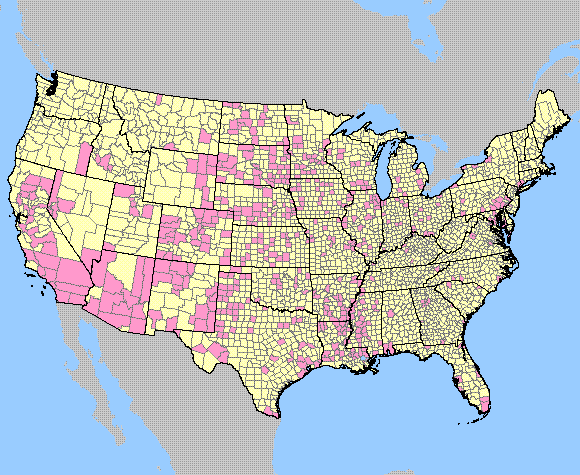
2003

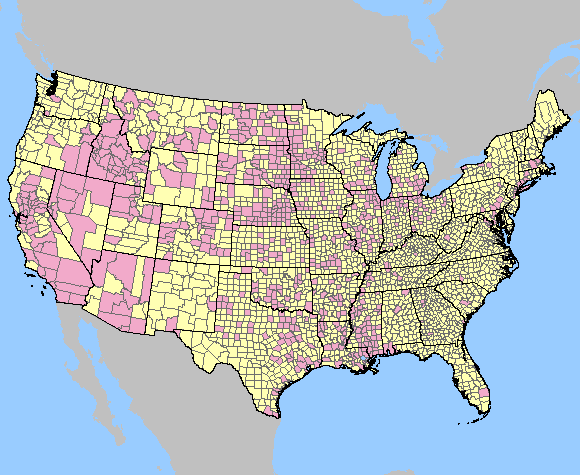
2006

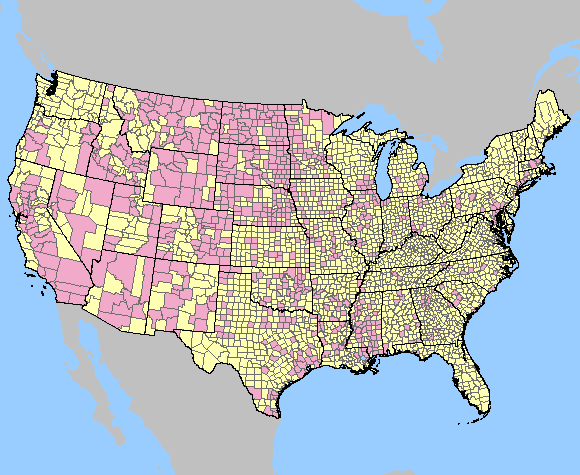
2007

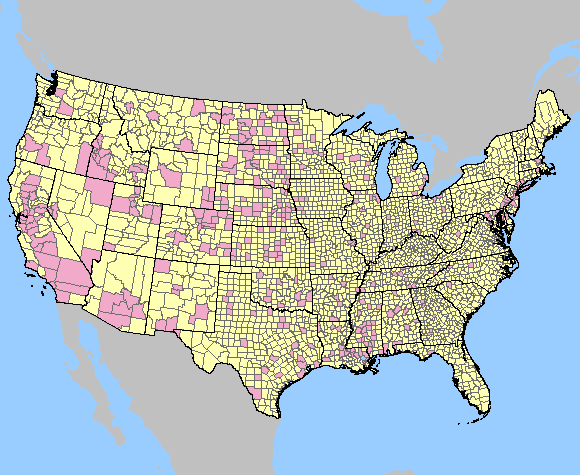
2008

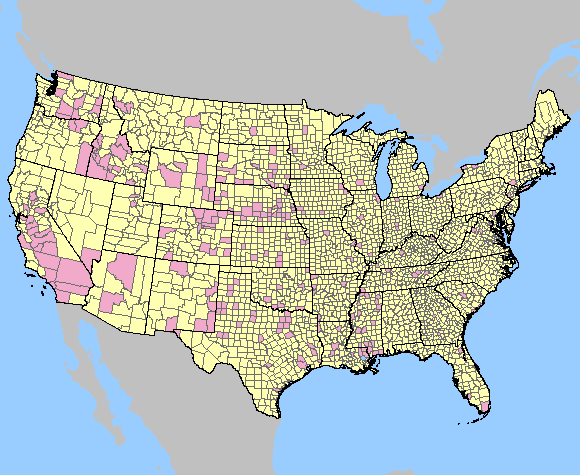
2009

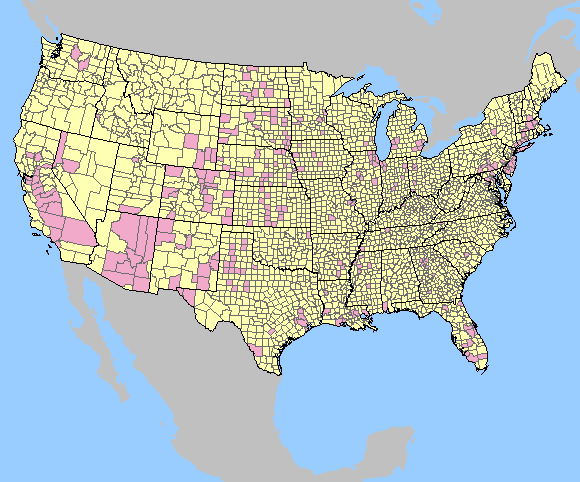
2010

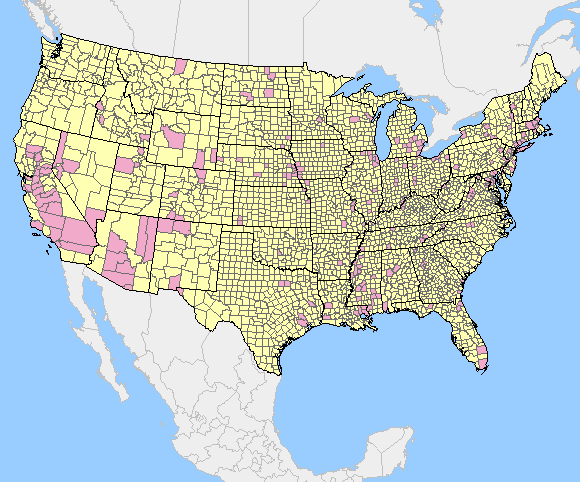
2011

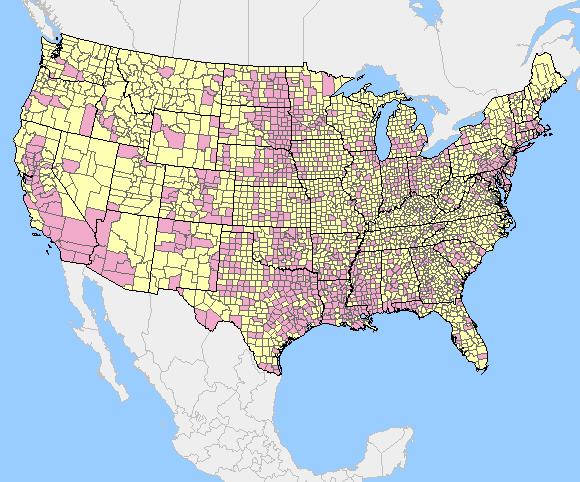
2012

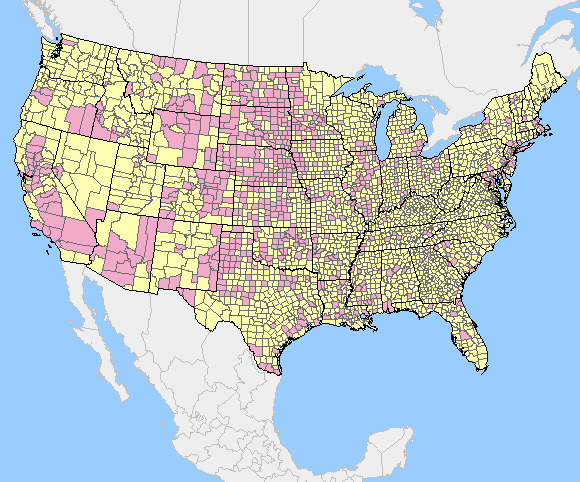
2013

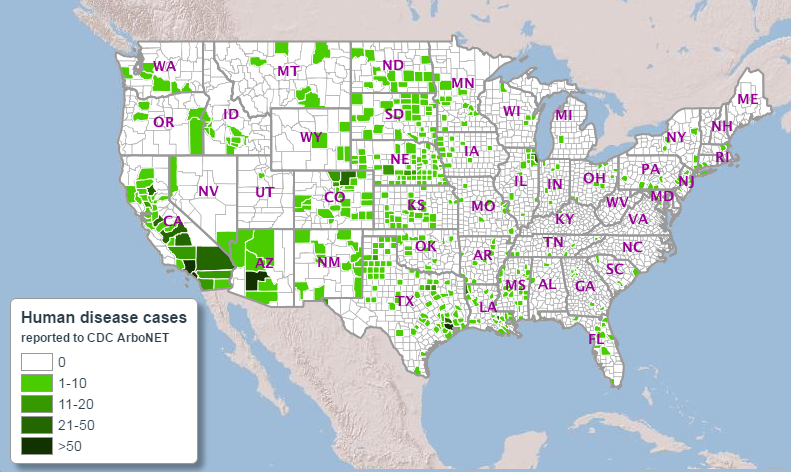
2014

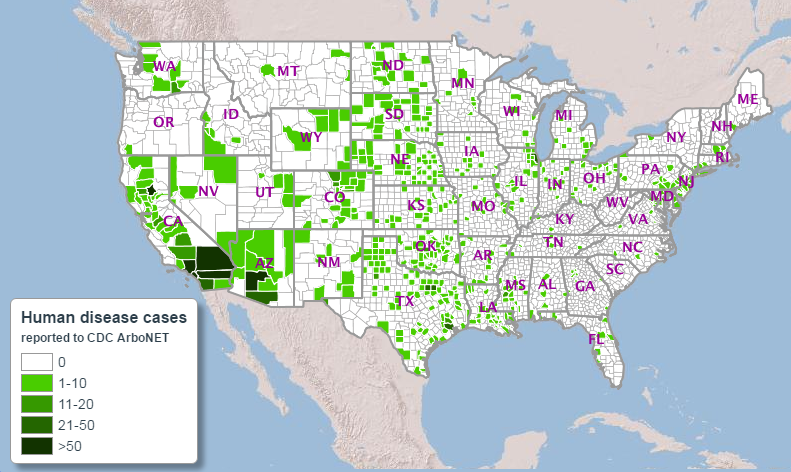
2015

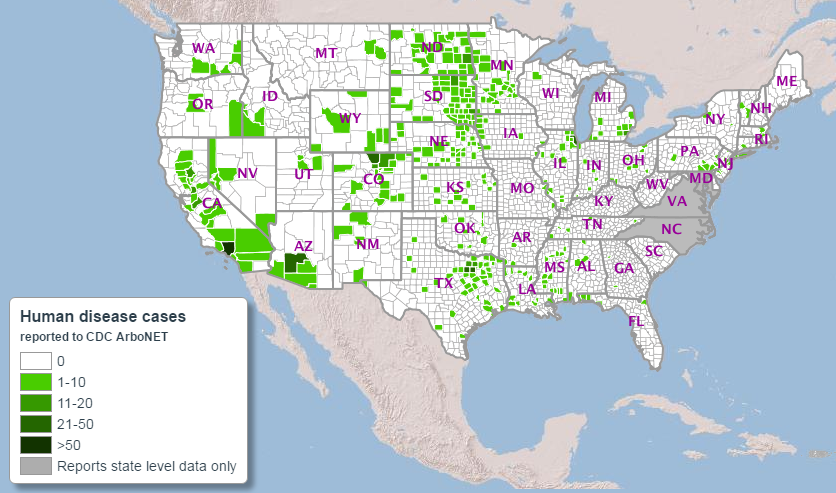
2016

== See also ==
- West Nile virus
- West Nile fever
- List of West Nile virus outbreaks
