= Severe fever with thrombocytopenia syndrome =

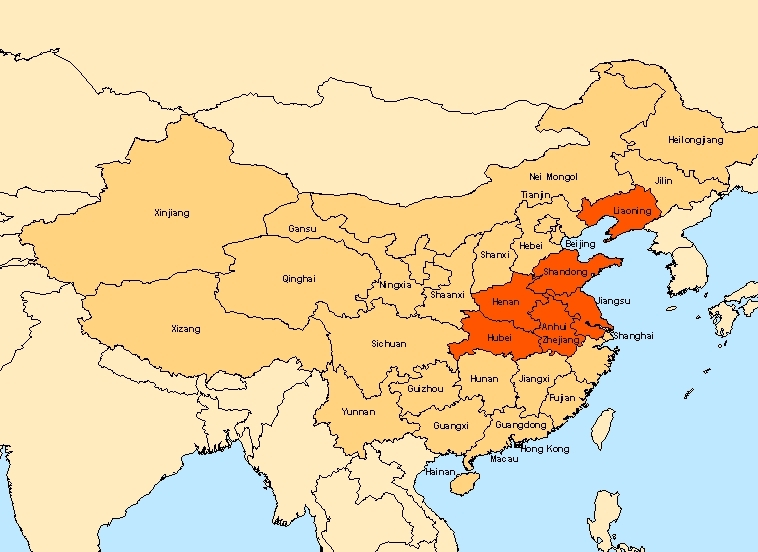
- SFTS bunyavirus isolated from patients in Central and Northeast provinces of China (red)
- Specialty: Infectious disease

Severe fever with thrombocytopenia syndrome (SFTS) is a tick-borne infection caused by Dabie bandavirus also known as the SFTS virus, first reported between late March and mid-July 2009 in rural areas of Hubei and Henan provinces in Central China.

It is an emerging infectious disease causing fever, vomiting, diarrhea, loss of consciousness and haemorrhage.

SFTS has fatality rates ranging from 12% to as high as 30% in some areas due to multiple organ failure, thrombocytopenia (low platelet count), leukopenia (low white blood cell count), and elevated liver enzyme levels.

== Virology ==
SFTS virus (SFTSV) is a virus in the order Bunyavirales, discovered in 2009.

== Transmission ==
The life cycle of the SFTSV most likely involves arthropod vectors like Haemaphysalis longicornis ticks and animal hosts.

Human-to-human transmission was not initially noted in 2011, but occurs via blood or mucus, as documented in 2012.

== Symptoms and signs ==
SFTS is an emerging infectious disease causing fever, vomiting, diarrhea, loss of consciousness and haemorrhage.

SFTS has fatality rates ranging from 12% to as high as 30% in some areas due to multiple organ failure, thrombocytopenia (low platelet count), leucopenia (low white blood cell count), and elevated liver enzyme levels.

In July 2013, South Korea reported a total of eight deaths since August 2012.

In July 2017, Japanese doctors reported that a woman had died of SFTS after being bitten by a cat that may have itself been infected by a tick. The woman had no visible tick bites, leading doctors to believe that the cat — which died as well — was the transmission vector.

== Epidemiology ==
SFTS occurs in China's rural areas from March to November with the majority of cases from April to July. The disease was first reported in Japan and South Korea in 2012.

In early 2020 an outbreak occurred in East China, more than 37 people were found with SFTS in Jiangsu province, while 23 more were found infected in Anhui province in August 2020. Seven people have died.
