= Deborah Asnis =

American infectious disease specialist

Deborah Susan Asnis (July 17, 1956 – September 12, 2015) was an American infectious disease specialist and H.I.V. clinical researcher, who is credited with reporting the first human cases of West Nile virus in the United States.

In August 1999, Asnis, the chief of infectious diseases at Flushing Hospital Medical Center in Queens, New York, noticed two male patients with similar, mysterious symptoms. Their symptoms included loss of arm and leg control, high fevers, and disorientation. She reported her patients' unusual symptoms to health authorities, who pursued further testing and analysis of the illness. Asnis' patients were diagnosed with West Nile virus in September 1999, the first known human cases of the disease in the United States.

Asnis had been praised for reporting her patients' symptoms to authorities. Not only did her actions lead to the discovery of the West Nile virus in the United States, but, by alerting authorities, Asnis likely prevented a more widespread initial outbreak of West Nile in the country.

== Biography ==
Asnis was born on July 17, 1956, in New Hyde Park, New York, to Ruth (née Kornblum), an accounting teacher, and Myron Asnis, a dentist. She graduated from Roslyn High School in Roslyn, New York. Asnis then earned her bachelor's degree from Northwestern University and her medical degree from Northwestern's Feinberg School of Medicine in 1981.

She resided in Hewlett, New York, with her husband, Hal Kazdin; the couple had two sons, Joshua and Matthew Kazdin.

=== West Nile discovery in the United States ===
In August 1999, Deborah Asnis, an infectious disease specialist at Flushing Hospital Medical Center in Queens, noticed two male patients who were suffering from similar, unusual symptoms. The two patients, aged 60 and 75 respectively, were exhibiting sudden paralysis in their arms and legs, as well as disorientation and high fevers. Lab testing also showed elevated numbers of white blood cells within the spinal fluid of both males. None of the patients were responding to antiviral drugs. Possible early hypothesizes included botulism, viral encephalitis, Guillain–Barré syndrome, or meningitis, but none of these illnesses exactly matched the symptoms. Asnis decided to pursue a more concrete diagnosis by contacting authorities and other colleagues.

Asnis contacted Marcelle Layton, the New York City Department of Health's chief epidemiologist, on Monday, August 23, 1999, to report her patients' symptoms. Layton advised Asnis to send samples of the patients' blood and spinal fluid to the New York State Department of Health in Albany for further analysis. By Friday, August 27, 1999, just four days after Asnis had contacted Layton, two additional patients had been identified in Queens. The number rose to eight by Sunday, August 29, at Flushing Hospital Medical Center and other hospitals in Queens. All of the early patients resided within a few miles of one another. They were also frequent gardeners in the evenings.

The Centers for Disease Control and Prevention (C.D.C.) initially identified the mystery illness as St. Louis encephalitis on September 3, 1999. The city of New York began widespread spraying for mosquitos later that same day. However, laboratory testing continued to be unable to determine a definitive cause of the symptoms.

The U.S. federal government revised its diagnosis from St. Louis encephalitis to West Nile virus on September 27, 1999, citing research by Duane J. Gubler, a C.D.C. expert on arborviruses, as well as several bird deaths in the Bronx, located to the north of Queens.

Deborah Asnis was credited by health experts with the early identification of West Nile virus in the United States. Her actions likely prevented a more widespread outbreak. In their 2003 book, "The New Killer Diseases: How the Alarming Evolution of Germs Threatens Us All," authors Elinor Levy and Mark Fischetti praised Dr. Asnis' response to the symptoms, writing that, "Asnis did something other doctors might not have bothered to do." They elaborated that, "One of the worst problems with our disease-detection system is that many doctors never report cases of strange symptoms, either because they are unsure of the disease they are facing, they're ignorant of the reporting requirement, or they simply never get around to it. Deborah Asnis was highly conscientious."

=== Later life ===
Asnis continued to practice as the chief of infectious diseases at Flushing Hospital Medical Center.

She died from breast cancer at Memorial Sloan Kettering Cancer Center in Manhattan, New York City, on September 12, 2015, at the age of 59. She was survived by her husband, Hal Kazdin; their sons, Joshua and Matthew Kazdin; and one of her two brothers, Gregory Asnis. Her mother, Ruth Asnis, died 6 days later on September 18, 2015.
