= Fogging (insect control) =

Technique used for killing insects

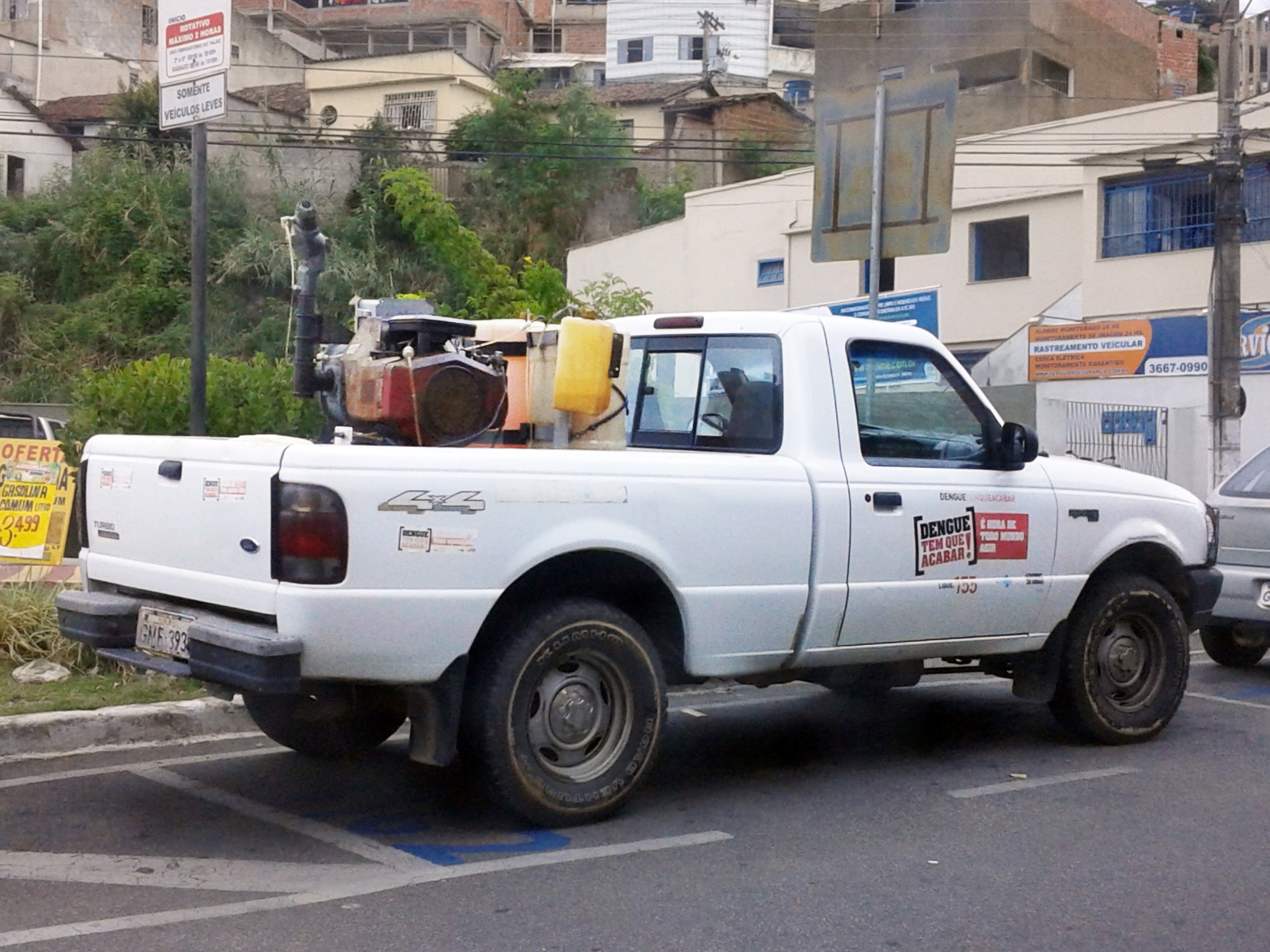
A fogging car used against the Aedes aegypti mosquito during a dengue fever outbreak in Coronel Fabriciano, Brazil, 2016

Fogging is a technique used for killing insects that involves using a fine pesticide spray (aerosol) which is directed by a blower. In some cases, a hot vapour may be used to carry the spray and keep it airborne for longer. Fast-acting pesticides like pyrethroids are typically used. This is widely used for sampling or studying insects in the canopy of tall forests which cannot be effectively reached. The floor below the trees are lined with plastic sheets and the fog causes insects to fall in the rain. These are collected for later study in the laboratory.

Fogging is also used for controlling insects in closed spaces like greenhouses, homes and basements.
