= Influenza A virus subtype H7N4 =

Virus classification
- (unranked): Virus
- Realm: Riboviria
- Kingdom: Orthornavirae
- Phylum: Negarnaviricota
- Class: Insthoviricetes
- Order: Articulavirales
- Family: Orthomyxoviridae
- Genus: Alphainfluenzavirus
- Species: Influenza A virus
- Serotype: Influenza A virus subtype H7N4

Virus subtype

H7N4 is a subtype of the species Influenza A virus.

A highly pathogenic strain of it caused a minor flu outbreak in 1997 in New South Wales, Australia in chicken.

On February 14, 2018, the Hong Kong Centre for Health Protection was notified by the National Health and Family Planning Commission of the People's Republic of China, that a 68-year-old female patient living in Changzhou of Jiangsu Province developed symptoms on Christmas day of 2017. According to the NHFPC, she was admitted to a hospital for medical treatment on the New Year's Day of 2018, and was discharged on January 22. She had had contact with live poultry before the onset of symptoms. No one whom she had close contact with had any symptoms during the medical surveillance period.
