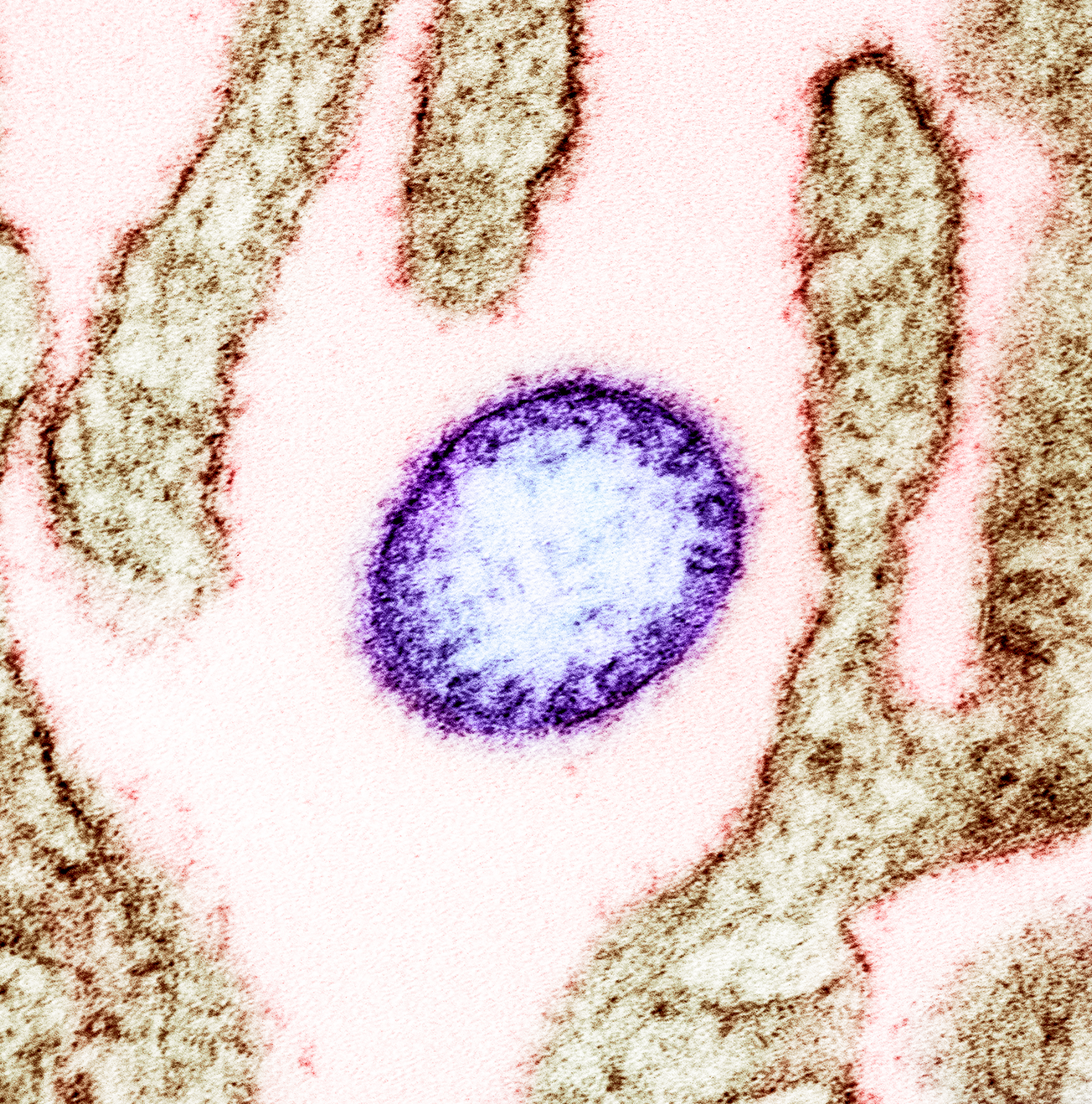
- False-color electron micrograph showing a Nipah virus particle (purple) by an infected Vero cell (brown)

Virus classification
- (unranked): Virus
- Realm: Riboviria
- Kingdom: Orthornavirae
- Phylum: Negarnaviricota
- Class: Monjiviricetes
- Order: Mononegavirales
- Family: Paramyxoviridae
- Genus: Henipavirus
- Species: Henipavirus nipahense

= Nipah virus =

Species of virus

Nipah virus (Henipavirus nipahense) is a bat-borne, zoonotic virus that causes Nipah virus infection in humans and other animals, a disease with a very high case fatality rate (40–75%). Numerous disease outbreaks caused by the Nipah virus have occurred in India, Malaysia, and Singapore. Nipah virus belongs to the genus Henipavirus along with the Hendra virus, which has also caused disease outbreaks.

== Virology ==
Like other henipaviruses, the Nipah virus genome is a single (non-segmented) negative-sense, single-stranded RNA of over 18 kb, which is substantially longer than that of other paramyxoviruses. The enveloped virus particles are variable in shape, and can be filamentous or spherical; they contain a helical nucleocapsid. Six structural proteins are generated: N (nucleocapsid), P (phosphoprotein), M (matrix), F (fusion), G (glycoprotein) and L (RNA polymerase). The P open reading frame also encodes three nonstructural proteins, C, V and W.

An atomic-scale structural model of a particle with a 90 nm diameter.

There are two envelope glycoproteins. The G glycoprotein ectodomain assembles as a homotetramer to form the viral anti-receptor or attachment protein, which binds to the receptor on the host cell. Each strand in the ectodomain consists of four distinct regions: at the N-terminal and connecting to the viral surface is the helical stalk, followed by the beta-sandwich neck domain, the linker region, and finally, at the C-terminal, four heads which contain host cell receptor binding domains.

Each head consists of a beta-propeller structure with six blades. There are three unique folding patterns of the heads, resulting in a 2-up/2-down configuration where two heads are positioned distal to the virus, and two heads are proximal. Due to the folding patterns and subsequent arrangement of the heads, only one of the four heads is positioned with its binding site accessible to associate with the host B2/B3 receptor.

The G protein head domain is also highly antigenic, inducing head-specific antibodies in primate models. As such, it is a prime target for vaccine development as well as antibody therapy. One head-specific antibody, m102.4, has been used in compassionate use cases and has completed Phase 1 clinical trials. The F glycoprotein forms a trimer, which mediates membrane fusion.

=== Tropism ===
Ephrins B2 and B3 have been identified as the main receptors for Nipah virus. Ephrin sub-types have a complex distribution of expression throughout the body, where the B3 is noted to have particularly high expression in some forebrain sub-regions.

== Geographic distribution ==
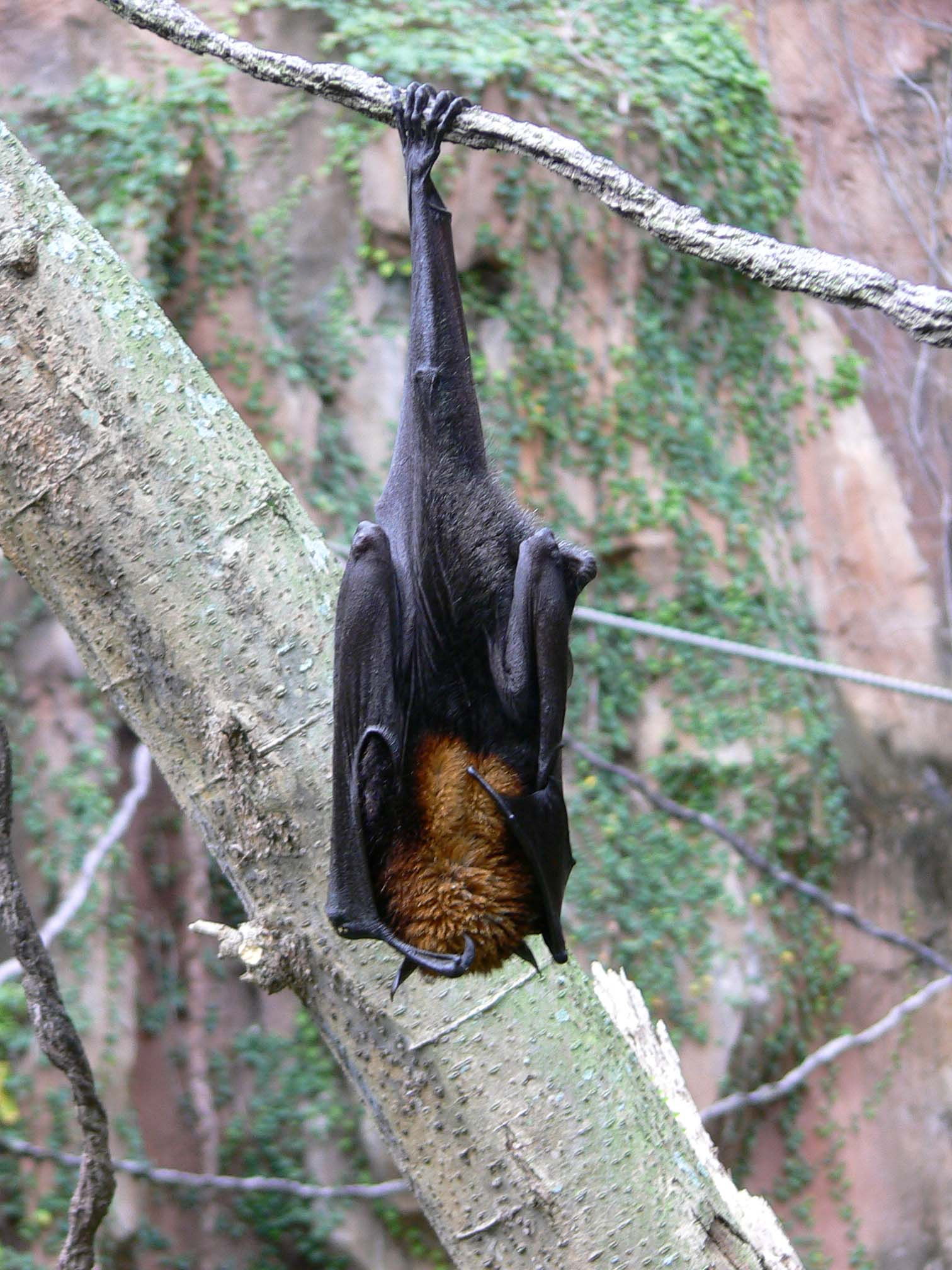
Pteropus vampyrus (large flying fox), one of the natural reservoirs of Nipah virus

Nipah virus has been isolated from Lyle's flying fox (Pteropus lylei) in Cambodia and its RNA has been detected in urine and saliva from P. lylei and Horsfield's roundleaf bat (Hipposideros larvatus) in Thailand. The virus has also been isolated from environmental samples of bat urine and partially eaten fruit in Malaysia. Antibodies to henipaviruses have also been found in fruit bats in Madagascar (Pteropus rufus, Eidolon dupreanum) and Ghana (Eidolon helvum), indicating a wide geographic distribution of the viruses.

No infection of humans or other species has been observed in Cambodia, Thailand, or Africa as of May 2018. In September 2023, India reported at least five infections and two deaths. In July 2024, a new infection occurred and a 14-year-old boy died as a result of it. In January 2026, two Nipah cases were confirmed in the state of West Bengal in India.

== Signs and symptoms ==
Human contraction of the virus may lead to asymptomatic infection, acute respiratory infection, or fatal brain inflammation (encephalitis). Clinical signs typically manifest within 3–14 days, which include fever and headache, often accompanied by a cough, throat soreness, difficulty breathing, and other common signs of respiratory illness. Patients may also initially present with symptoms of myalgia and vomiting.

This can be followed by dizziness, drowsiness, altered consciousness, and neurological signs that indicate acute encephalitis. Some people can also experience atypical pneumonia and severe respiratory problems, including acute respiratory distress. Encephalitis and seizures occur in severe cases, progressing to coma within 24 to 48 hours.

The incubation period is from 4 to 14 days, but an incubation period as long as 45 days has been reported.

Death occurs in 40–75% of cases, and some long-term side effects of infection include persistent convulsions and personality changes. Most survivors make a full recovery, although some are left with residual neurological conditions after acute encephalitis. Some cases of relapse have been reported.

== History ==
=== Emergence ===
The first cases of Nipah virus infection were identified in 1998, when an outbreak of neurological and respiratory disease on pig farms in peninsular Malaysia caused 265 human cases, with 108 deaths. The virus was isolated in the following year of 1999. This outbreak resulted in the culling of one million pigs. In Singapore, 11 cases, including one death, occurred in slaughterhouse workers exposed to pigs imported from the affected Malaysian farms.

The name "Nipah" refers to the place, Sungai Nipah (literally 'nipah river') in Port Dickson, Negeri Sembilan, the source of the human case from which Nipah virus was first isolated.

The outbreak was originally mistaken for Japanese encephalitis, but physicians in the area noted that people who had been vaccinated against Japanese encephalitis were not protected in the epidemic, and the number of cases among adults was unusual. Although these observations were recorded in the first month of the outbreak, the Ministry of Health failed to take them into account, and launched a nationwide campaign to educate people on the dangers of Japanese encephalitis and its vector, Culex mosquitoes.

Symptoms of infection from the Malaysian outbreak were primarily encephalitic in humans and respiratory in pigs. Later outbreaks have caused respiratory illness in humans, increasing the likelihood of human-to-human transmission and indicating the existence of more dangerous strains of the virus.

During the 1999 outbreak of Nipah virus, which occurred among pig farmers, the majority of human infections stemmed from direct contact with sick pigs and the unprotected handling of secretions from the pigs.

Based on seroprevalence data and virus isolations, the primary reservoir for Nipah virus was identified as pteropid fruit bats, including Pteropus vampyrus (large flying fox), and Pteropus hypomelanus (small flying fox), both found in Malaysia.

The transmission of the Nipah virus from flying foxes to pigs is thought to be due to an increasing overlap between bat habitats and piggeries in peninsular Malaysia. In one outbreak, fruit orchards were in proximity to the piggery, allowing the spillage of urine, feces, and partially eaten fruit onto the pigs. Retrospective studies demonstrate that viral spillover into pigs may have been occurring, undetected, in Malaysia since 1996. During 1998, viral spread was aided by the transfer of infected pigs to other farms, where new outbreaks occurred.

=== Future threat ===
The Nipah virus has been classified by the Centers for Disease Control and Prevention (CDC) as a Category C agent. Nipah virus is one of several viruses identified by the World Health Organization (WHO) as a potential cause of future epidemics in a new plan developed after the Ebola epidemic for urgent research and development toward new diagnostic tests, vaccines and medicines. Identifying the factors that lead to outbreaks and conducting studies to understand how the virus spreads between species can help create better prevention strategies and reduce the chances of future outbreaks.

A major future challenge is to develop and maintain a supply of reliable, targeted, and affordable testing tools to enable rapid diagnostics in labs located in regions where the virus is likely to be found in wildlife reservoirs. Active collaboration between institutions and coordination among human and animal virologists are crucial for early outbreak detection and prompt implementation of preventive measures.

The presence of fruit bats in various tropical countries, including Cambodia, Indonesia, Madagascar, the Philippines, and Thailand, is also recognized as a potential risk factor for future Nipah virus outbreaks.

Global travel and trade increase the risk of the Nipah virus spreading beyond its endemic regions, as undetected cases could cross borders. This calls for strong international surveillance and rapid response systems to monitor and contain potential outbreaks effectively.

The clinical impact of the Nipah virus highlights ongoing global public health risks due to the lack of effective treatments and vaccines. A strong international focus on developing vaccines and treatments is essential to reduce the health effects and future risks of Nipah virus.

=== Prevention and treatment ===
Presently, there are no dedicated drugs or vaccines available for the treatment or prevention of Nipah virus infection. The World Health Organization (WHO) has designated the Nipah virus as a priority disease within the WHO Research and Development Blueprint. In cases of severe respiratory and neurological complications resulting from Nipah virus infection, healthcare professionals advise intensive supportive care as the primary treatment approach.

In 2019, the World Health Organization (WHO) released an advanced draft of a research and development roadmap aimed at accelerating the creation of medical countermeasures, including diagnostics, treatments, and vaccines, to support effective and timely responses to Nipah virus outbreaks.

In the 1998–99 Nipah virus outbreak in Malaysia, 140 patients received ribavirin, with their outcomes assessed against 54 historical controls who either lacked access to the drug or declined treatment. Results indicated a reduced mortality rate (32% compared to 54%) among those treated, although the use of historical controls could have introduced bias. No further clinical studies with ribavirin have been conducted, and research in animal models has not demonstrated its effectiveness against Nipah or Hendra virus infections. Studies in animal models have also explored the use of chloroquine, both independently and with ribavirin, but have not demonstrated any therapeutic benefit.

A potentially more effective method is the application of monoclonal antibodies (mAbs), which can help neutralize the Nipah virus through passive administration. Treatment with anti-Nipah virus monoclonal antibodies (mAbs) could be beneficial for early intervention and post-exposure prophylaxis in individuals exposed to the virus. The m102.4 antibody has demonstrated protective effects against lethal Nipah virus challenges in animal studies and has been administered under compassionate use to those exposed to either Hendra or Nipah viruses.

In 2016, a phase 1 clinical trial for m102.4 was conducted in Australia with 40 participants, demonstrating that the treatment was safe and well-tolerated, with no signs of an immunogenic response. Further research requirements for mAb therapy involve conducting clinical trials in endemic regions to evaluate its safety, tolerability, effectiveness, and pharmacokinetic properties in more detail.

Remdesivir is another potential treatment option for the Nipah virus. Favipiravir and fusion inhibitory peptides may also show potential; however, additional studies are required to evaluate their effectiveness.

In December 2025, a candidate vaccine, ChAdOx1 NipahB, commenced Phase II clinical trials after completing Phase I and laboratory and animal testing. However, the low occurrence of Nipah virus presents a significant challenge for conducting traditional Phase III vaccine efficacy trials, as achieving a sample size large enough to reliably estimate vaccine effectiveness with sufficient statistical power is difficult.

Prevention of Nipah virus infection requires a coordinated One Health approach that integrates human, animal, and environmental health sectors. Because fruit bats of the genus Pteropus serve as the natural reservoir of the virus, prevention strategies focus on reducing opportunities for spillover transmission from wildlife to domestic animals and humans. In agricultural settings, improving farm biosecurity measures can reduce contact between bats and livestock, particularly pigs, which have historically served as an intermediate host during outbreaks. Measures such as covering animal feed, preventing bat access to livestock enclosures, and maintaining sanitary farm environments help reduce the risk of viral transmission.

In several regions of South and Southeast Asia, human infections have been associated with consumption of raw date palm sap contaminated by bat saliva or urine. Public health interventions have therefore promoted the use of physical barriers such as bamboo skirts placed around date palm collection pots to prevent bats from accessing the sap. Community education campaigns also encourage boiling or avoiding consumption of raw palm sap during peak bat activity seasons.

Surveillance systems are an essential component of Nipah virus prevention. Integrated surveillance programs monitor human illness, livestock health, and wildlife populations to identify potential outbreaks early. Collaboration between public health authorities, veterinary services, and environmental agencies allows rapid detection of spillover events and implementation of control measures such as quarantine, movement restrictions, and infection control procedures in healthcare settings. These strategies highlight the importance of a multidisciplinary One Health framework for managing emerging zoonotic diseases.

=== Outbreaks of disease ===
Nipah virus infection outbreaks have been reported in Malaysia, Singapore, Bangladesh, and India. The highest mortality due to Nipah virus infection has occurred in Bangladesh, where outbreaks are typically seen in the winter. Nipah virus first appeared in 1998, in peninsular Malaysia in pigs and pig farmers. By mid-1999, more than 265 human cases of encephalitis, including 105 deaths, had been reported in Malaysia, and 11 cases of either encephalitis or respiratory illness with one fatality were reported in Singapore.

In 2001, Nipah virus was reported from Meherpur District, Bangladesh and Siliguri, India. The outbreak again appeared in 2003, 2004 and 2005 in Naogaon District, Manikganj District, Rajbari District, Faridpur District and Tangail District. In Bangladesh there were also outbreaks in subsequent years. In September 2021, Nipah virus resurfaced in Kerala, India claiming the life of a 12-year-old boy. An outbreak of Nipah virus occurred during January and February 2023 in Bangladesh with a total of 11 cases (10 confirmed, 1 probable) resulting in 8 deaths, a case fatality rate of 73%. This outbreak resulted in the highest number of cases reported since 2015 in Bangladesh, and ten of the 11 cases during the 2023 outbreak had a confirmed history of consuming date palm sap.

In July 2024, an outbreak was confirmed in Kerala state in India. A 14-year-old boy died, and an additional 60 people were identified as being in the high-risk category of having the disease. In January 2026, health authorities in West Bengal, India, moved to contain a confirmed Nipah virus outbreak after reporting five confirmed cases, including healthcare workers.

In February 2026, a 25-year-old nurse in Kolkata, India, died of cardiac arrest after recovering from Nipah virus.

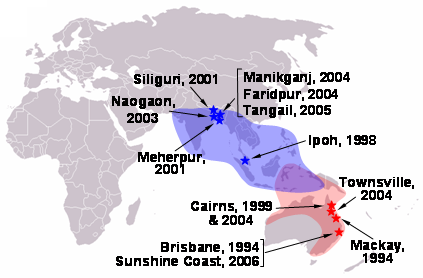
The locations of henipavirus outbreaks (red stars–Hendra virus; blue stars–Nipah virus) and the distribution of henipavirus flying fox reservoirs (red shading–Hendra virus; blue shading–Nipah virus)

=== Factors contributing to outbreaks ===
==== Population density ====
The Nipah virus (NiV) has been detected in several of the world's most densely populated areas, particularly in Southeast Asia (SEAR). This region covers just 5% of the Earth's total land area, yet it is home to 26% of the global population. Bangladesh is home to the world's most densely populated urban area, while Kerala, a state in southern India, ranks among the most densely populated states in India. High population density leads to increased interactions among people and between humans and their environments, which, coupled with the presence of farm animals in densely populated areas, raises the risk of viral spillover.

==== Deforestation and climate change ====
Deforestation in the Southeast Asia region is occurring at an alarming pace, driven by factors such as grazing, agricultural expansion, industrialization, and urban development. Deforestation has been identified as the key factor in the Nipah virus outbreak in Malaysia during 1998–1999, as it increased human contact with bats infected with the virus. Widespread deforestation and habitat fragmentation drive wildlife, especially fruit bats, the natural reservoirs of the Nipah virus, into closer proximity with human communities and livestock. As bats lose their natural habitats, they increasingly venture into agricultural areas to find food, which raises the likelihood of spillover events.

Severe climatic changes have also been implicated in triggering NiV outbreaks in Bangladesh and India. The northwestern areas of Bangladesh have experienced extreme temperatures along with a rise in drought occurrences. The Nipah virus outbreak in Malaysia occurred following a drought linked to El Niño conditions. The particular weather patterns and changes have been associated with spillover events. In addition to droughts, flooding, and rising sea levels, bats have been driven to migrate further into village areas. Climate change and extreme weather events negatively impact biodiversity, animal distribution, and microflora, all of which may raise the likelihood of zoonotic agents emerging and infectious disease outbreaks occurring.

==== Socioeconomic factors ====
Economic conditions, poverty levels, and population dynamics significantly influence a nation's overall strength; in areas where healthcare infrastructure is lacking, effectively managing outbreaks and delivering sufficient care to those infected becomes particularly difficult, worsening the consequences of Nipah virus outbreaks. While pig farming has served as a significant source of income for farmers, the Nipah virus outbreak in Malaysia originated from pigs and their enclosures. The extensive culling of pigs due to the outbreak resulted in increased poverty and challenges related to recovery in the affected regions. Limited public awareness of safe eating practices and the dangers linked to wildlife can increase exposure risks. Public health campaigns focused on food safety and avoiding bat habitats are essential for lowering these risks.

== In popular culture ==
In the 2011 movie Contagion a Nipah virus DNA sequence is shown as the main sequence of the fictional meningoencephalitic virus (MEV–1), in a scene describing recombination.

== See also ==
- 1998–1999 Malaysia Nipah virus outbreak
- Nipah virus outbreaks in Kerala
