= SFTS virus =

Virus classification
- (unranked): Virus
- Realm: Riboviria
- Kingdom: Orthornavirae
- Phylum: Negarnaviricota
- Class: Bunyaviricetes
- Order: Hareavirales
- Family: Phenuiviridae
- Genus: Bandavirus
- Species: Bandavirus dabieense

Synonyms
- SFTS virus; SFTS phlebovirus; Dabie bandavirus; Dabie mountain virus; SFTS bunyavirus; Huaiyangshan banyangvirus

Species of virus

SFTS virus is a tick-borne virus in the genus Bandavirus in the family Phenuiviridae. The clinical condition it caused is known as severe fever with thrombocytopenia syndrome (SFTS). SFTS is an emerging infectious disease that was first described in northeast and central China 2009 and now has also been discovered in Japan, South Korea, Vietnam and Taiwan in 2015. SFTS has a fatality rate of 12% and as high as over 30% in some areas. The major clinical symptoms of SFTS are fever, vomiting, diarrhea, multiple organ failure, thrombocytopenia (low platelet count), leukopenia (low white blood cell count) and elevated liver enzyme levels. Another outbreak occurred in East China in the early half of 2020.

== History ==
In 2009, Xue-jie Yu and colleagues isolated the SFTS virus (SFTSV) from SFTS patients' blood.

== Genome ==
The sequence of the genome was published in 2011. There are three segments—large (L), medium (M) and small (S). Five proteins have been identified—an RNA dependent RNA polymerase (RdRp), a glycoprotein N (Gn), a glycoprotein C (Gc), a nuclear protein (NP) and a non structural protein (NSs).

The L segment encodes the RNA polymerase with 2084 amino acid residues.

The M segment encodes one open reading frame encoding 1073 amino acid precursors of glycoproteins (Gn and Gc).

The S segment has 1746 nucleotides of ambisense RNA encoding two proteins, the N and NSs proteins. These lie in opposite orientations and are separated by a 54 nucleotide intergenic region.

== Evolution ==
The virus originated 50–150 years ago and has undergone a recent population expansion. Five genotypes (A–E) have been identified. Strains from China could be grouped into all five genotypes while isolates from South Korea lay in three (types A, D and E) and those from Japan only in one (type E). The virus appears to have originated in the Dabie Mountains in central China between 1918 and 1995.

Among bunyaviruses, it appears to be more closely related to the Uukuniemi virus serogroup than to the Sandfly fever group. It is a member of the Bhanja virus serocomplex.

== Life cycle ==
SFTSV is a tick-borne virus; it is not clear whether it can be transmitted by other blood-sucking arthropods. It can infect many mammalian hosts, including cats, mice, hedgehogs, weasels, brushtail possums and yaks. Humans appear to be accidental hosts, and play no essential role in the life cycle of SFTSV. SFTSV has been detected from the ixodid tick, Haemaphysalis longicornis, Ixodes nipponensis, Amblyomma testudinarium and Rhipicephalus microplus. In addition to tick bite, SFTSV can be transmitted from person to person through contact with blood or mucus of an infected person.

== Epidemiology ==
This virus has been found in the Chinese provinces of Anhui, Henan, Hubei, Jiangsu, Liaoning and Shandong. SFTS occurs in rural areas, from March to November, and a majority of cases are found from April to July.

The virus has also been found in South Korea, Japan, Vietnam and Taiwan.
