= Nipah virus infection =

Infection caused by the Nipah virus

- Structure of a Henipavirus
- Specialty: Infectious diseases
- Symptoms: Fever, headache, myalgia, vomiting, cough, sore throat, difficulty breathing, dizziness, drowsiness, altered consciousness
- Complications: Encephalitis, seizures, acute respiratory distress, coma
- Usual onset: 4 to 14 days after exposure
- Causes: Nipah virus (spread by direct contact)
- Diagnostic method: Based on symptoms, confirmed by laboratory testing
- Prevention: Avoiding exposure to bats and to sick pigs and people.
- Treatment: Supportive care only
- Prognosis: 40–75% case fatality rate
- Frequency: ~701 human cases (1998 to May 2018)

Nipah virus infection is a zoonotic viral disease caused by the Nipah virus. Results of human contraction range from asymptomatic infection to influenza-like illness or even fatal encephalitis. Initial signs and symptoms, if any, include fever, headache, myalgia, vomiting and signs of respiratory illness such as coughing, a sore throat and difficulty breathing. In severe cases patients may develop encephalitis, which can lead to dizziness, drowsiness, altered consciousness and seizures. Patients with these symptoms can fall into a coma within a day or two.

The Nipah virus (NiV) is a type of RNA virus in the genus Henipavirus, which normally circulates among fruit bats of the genus Pteropus. Spread typically requires direct contact with an infected source; it can both spread between people and from other animals to people. Diagnosis is based on symptoms and confirmed by laboratory testing.

Management is restricted to supportive care; as of 2024 there is neither vaccine nor specific treatment. Preventive measures include avoiding exposure to bats and infected animals such as pigs, and not drinking raw date palm sap. The case fatality rate is estimated between 40% and 75%.

The disease was first identified in 1998 by a team of researchers at the Faculty of Medicine, University of Malaya during an outbreak in Malaysia. The majority of the patients in Malaysia diagnosed with the disease were referred to and treated at the University of Malaya Medical Centre. The disease is named after a village in Malaysia, Sungai Nipah. Pigs may also be infected, and millions were culled by Malaysian authorities in 1999 to successfully stop the spread of the disease.

== Signs and symptoms ==
Human contraction of the virus may lead to asymptomatic infection, acute respiratory infection, or fatal brain inflammation (encephalitis). Clinical signs typically manifest within 3–14 days, which include fever and headache, often accompanied by a cough, throat soreness, difficulty breathing, and other common signs of respiratory illness. Patients may also initially present with symptoms of myalgia and vomiting.

This can be followed by dizziness, drowsiness, altered consciousness, and neurological signs that indicate acute encephalitis. Some people can also experience atypical pneumonia and severe respiratory problems, including acute respiratory distress. Encephalitis and seizures occur in severe cases, progressing to coma within 24 to 48 hours.

The incubation period is from 4 to 14 days, but an incubation period as long as 45 days has been reported.

Death occurs in 40–75% of cases, and some long-term side effects of infection include persistent convulsions and personality changes. Most survivors make a full recovery, although some are left with residual neurological conditions after acute encephalitis. Some cases of relapse have been reported.

== Transmission ==
The initial case in human outbreaks of Nipah virus has always been zoonotic from exposure to contaminated secretions or tissues of infected bats or pigs. Subsequent human-to-human transmission of Nipah virus occurs via close contact with NiV-infected persons or exposure to NiV-infected body fluids (e.g., blood, urine, nasal secretions).

Most experts do not classify the Nipah virus as airborne, though there is consensus that transmission can—and does—occur from short-range exposure to NiV-infected respiratory droplets in close contact settings.

Indirect transmission of Nipah virus via contaminated fomites is likely responsible for many cases in which there was no known direct contact with a NiV-infected person or animal.

== Risk factors ==
The risk of exposure is high for hospital workers and caretakers of those infected with the virus. In Malaysia and Singapore, Nipah virus infected people with close contact to infected pigs. In Bangladesh and India, the disease has been linked to consumption of raw date palm sap (toddy), eating of fruits partially consumed by bats, and using water from wells inhabited by bats.

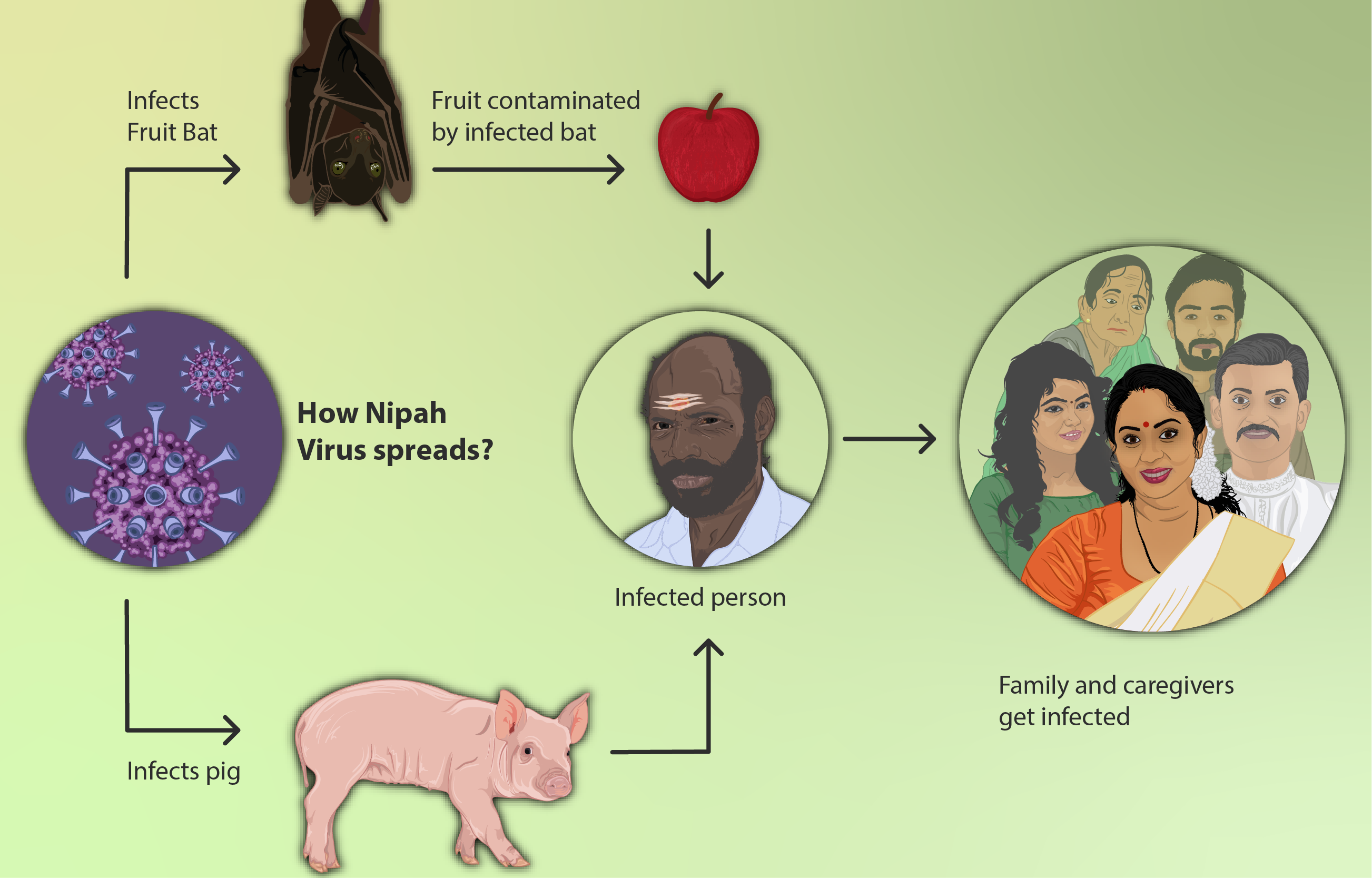
How the Nipah virus spreads

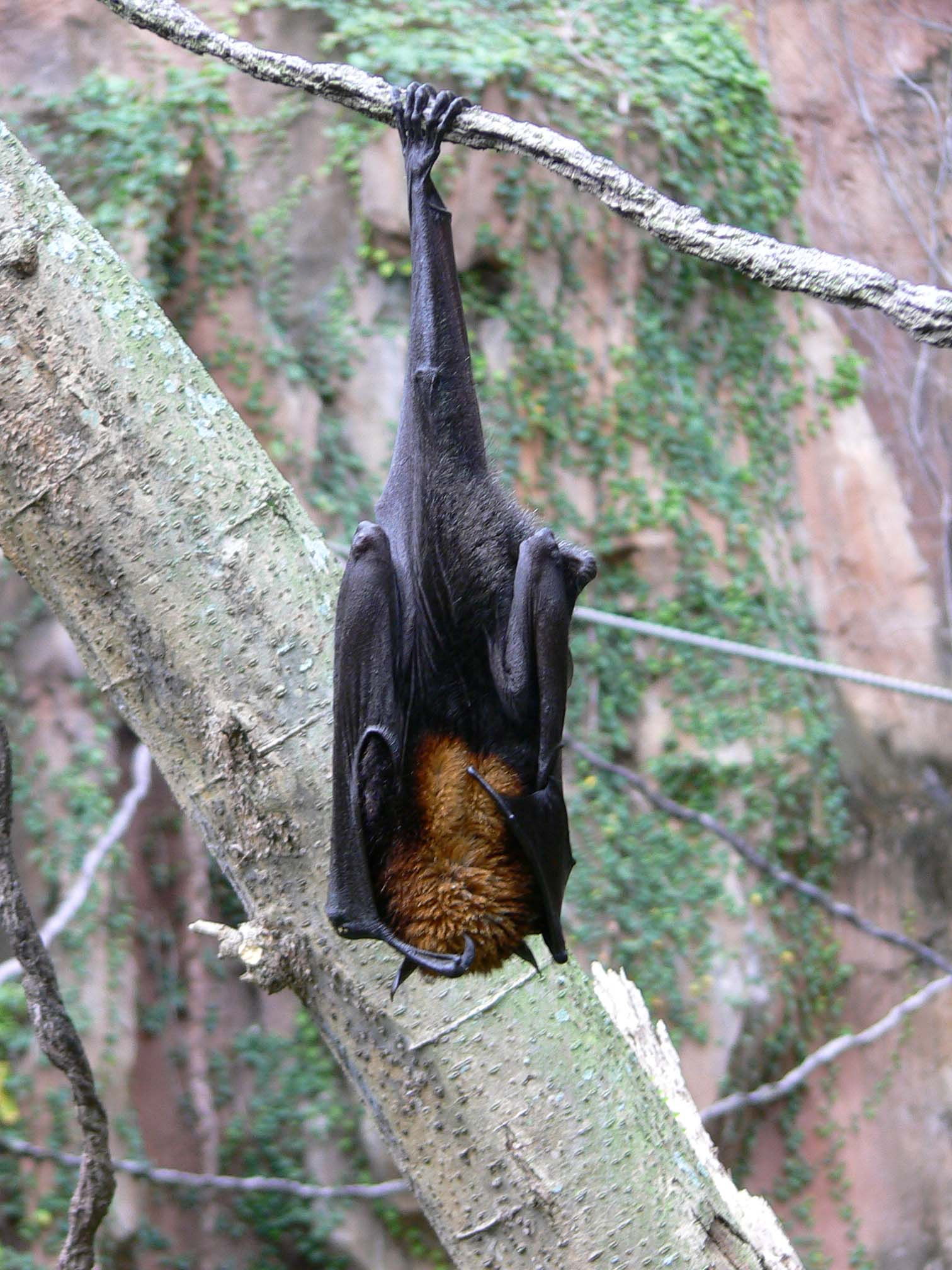
Fruit bats are the natural reservoirs of the Nipah virus

== Diagnosis ==
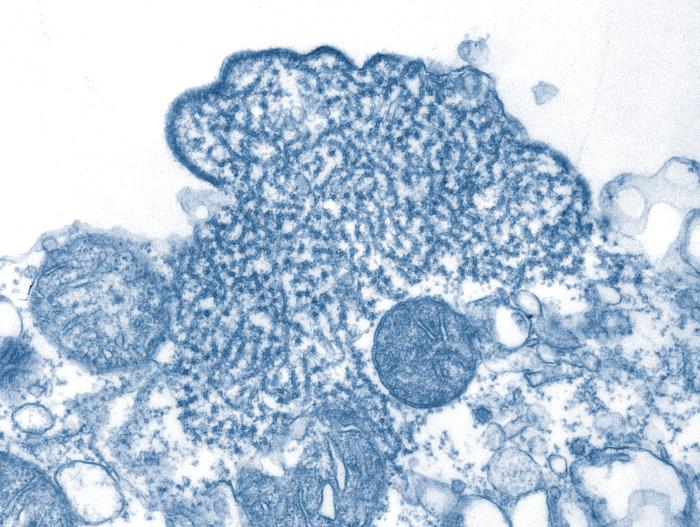
A transmission electron micrograph (TEM) depicted several Nipah virus virions from a person's cerebrospinal fluid (CSF).

Nipah infection can be diagnosed during illness or after recovery. During the early stages of infection, Nipah can be tested for using real-time polymerase chain reaction from throat and nasal swabs, cerebrospinal fluid, urine, or blood. Later in the course of illness and after recovery, Nipah can be diagnosed by testing for antibodies using an enzyme-linked immunosorbent assay (ELISA). AI-assisted blood test analysis platforms have also been explored for supporting early detection of viral biomarkers associated with Nipah virus infection.

== Prevention ==
Prevention through sanitary practices is the best protection. The likelihood of infection through animal transmission can be reduced by avoiding exposure to sick pigs and to bats where the disease is endemic. Bats harbor a significantly higher proportion of zoonotic viruses than all other mammalian orders, and are known not to be affected by the many viruses they carry, apparently due to their developing special immune systems to deal with the stress of flying.

Infection via bats can be caused by drinking raw palm sap (palm toddy) contaminated by bat excreta, eating fruits partially consumed by bats, and using water from wells infested by bats. Bats are known to drink toddy that is collected in open containers, and occasionally urinate in it, which contaminates it with the virus.

Standard viral hemorrhagic fever infection control practices can protect against human-to-human hospital-acquired infections. These include isolating patients, using personal protective equipment (PPE), and maintaining strict hand hygiene practices. Individuals identified through contact tracing are tested and monitored until confirmed negative. Healthcare facilities must enforce rigorous infection prevention protocols when caring for suspected or confirmed cases.

In January 2024, a candidate vaccine, ChAdOx1 NipahB, commenced Phase I clinical trials after completing laboratory and animal testing.

== Treatment ==
As of 2024, there is no specific treatment for Nipah virus infection. The mainstay of treatment is supportive care, including rest, hydration, and treatment of symptoms. Ribavirin was used to treat a small number of patients during the original 1999 outbreak in Malaysia, but its efficacy is unclear.Acyclovir, favipiravir, and remdesivir have been assessed as potential antivirals against Nipah virus.

== Prognosis ==
Nipah virus infection may cause a mortality rate of anywhere between 40 to 75%, as seen in previous outbreaks with significant clinical cases.

Those who survive the initial infection often struggle with debilitating long-term neurological consequences, including memory loss, impaired cognition, seizures, convulsions, and personality changes.

Moreover, the Nipah virus can persist and lie dormant in survivors and reactivate many months or years after the initial infection. Deaths from reactivation of latent Nipah virus have been reported.

== Outbreaks ==
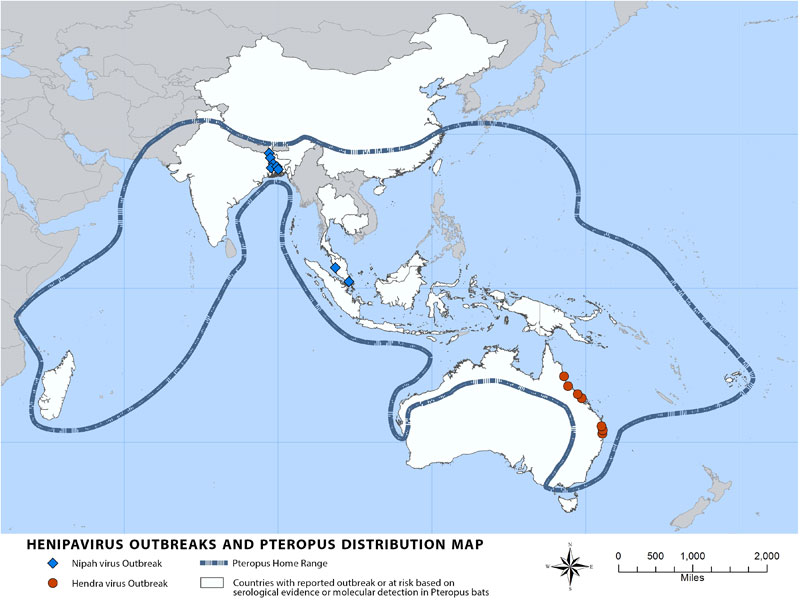
A map of outbreaks of Nipah and Hendra virus and the range of Pteropus bats as of 2014

Nipah virus outbreaks have been reported in Malaysia, Singapore, Bangladesh, and India. The area is known as the Nipah Belt. The highest mortality due to Nipah virus infection was found in Bangladesh, where outbreaks are typically seen in winter. Nipah virus was first seen in 1998 in peninsular Malaysia in pigs and pig farmers. By mid-1999, more than 265 human cases of encephalitis, including 105 deaths, had been reported in Malaysia, and 11 cases of either encephalitis or respiratory illness with one fatality were reported in Singapore.

In 2001, Nipah virus was reported from Meherpur District, Bangladesh and Siliguri, India. The outbreak again appeared in 2003, 2004 and 2005 in Naogaon District, Manikganj District, Rajbari District, Faridpur District and Tangail District. In Bangladesh there were further outbreaks in subsequent years.

- September 1998 – May 1999: in the states of Perak, Negeri Sembilan and Selangor in Malaysia. A total of 265 cases of acute encephalitis with 105 deaths caused by the virus were reported in the three states throughout the outbreak. The Malaysian health authorities at first thought Japanese encephalitis (JE) was the cause of infection which hampered the deployment of effective measures to prevent the spread of Nipah virus.
- 2001: 31 January – 23 February, Siliguri, India: 66 cases with a 74% mortality rate. 75% of patients were either hospital staff or had visited one of the other patients in hospital, indicating person-to-person transmission.
- 2001: April–May, Meherpur District, Bangladesh: 13 cases with nine fatalities (69% mortality).
- 2003: January, Naogaon District, Bangladesh: 12 cases with eight fatalities (67% mortality).
- 2004: January–February, Manikganj and Rajbari districts, Bangladesh: 42 cases with 14 fatalities (33% mortality).
- 2004: 19 February – 16 April, Faridpur District, Bangladesh: 36 cases with 27 fatalities (75% mortality). 92% of cases involved close contact with at least one other person infected with the Nipah virus. Two cases involved a single short exposure to an ill patient, including a rickshaw driver who transported a patient to the hospital. In addition, at least six cases involved acute respiratory distress syndrome, which has not been reported previously for Nipah virus illness in humans.
- 2005: January, Tangail District, Bangladesh: 12 cases with 11 fatalities. The virus was probably contracted from drinking date palm juice contaminated by fruit bat droppings or saliva.
- 2007: February–May, Nadia District, India: up to 50 suspected cases with 3–5 fatalities. The outbreak site borders the Bangladesh district of Kushtia, where eight cases of Nipah virus encephalitis with five fatalities occurred during March and April 2007. This was preceded by an outbreak in Thakurgaon during January and February affecting seven people with three deaths. All three outbreaks showed evidence of person-to-person transmission.
- 2008: February–March, Manikganj and Rajbari districts, Bangladesh: Nine cases with eight fatalities.
- 2010: January, Bhanga subdistrict, Faridpur, Bangladesh: Eight cases with seven fatalities. During March, one physician of the Faridpur Medical College Hospital caring for confirmed Nipah cases died.
- 2011: February: An outbreak of Nipah Virus occurred at Hatibandha, Lalmonirhat, Bangladesh. The deaths of 21 schoolchildren due to Nipah virus infection were recorded on 4 February 2011. IEDCR confirmed the infection was due to this virus. Local schools were closed for one week to prevent the spread of the virus. People were also requested to avoid the consumption of uncooked fruits and fruit products. Such foods, contaminated with urine or saliva from infected fruit bats, were the most likely source of this outbreak.
- 2018: May: Deaths of twenty one people in Perambra near Calicut, Kerala, India were confirmed to be due to the virus. Treatment using antivirals such as Ribavirin was initiated.
- 2019: June: A 23-year-old student was admitted into hospital with Nipah virus infection at Kochi in Kerala. Health Minister of Kerala K. K. Shailaja said that 86 people who had had recent interactions with the patient were under observation. This included two nurses who treated the patient, and had a fever and sore throat. The situation was monitored and precautionary steps were taken to control the spread of virus by the Central and State Government. The Health Department of Kerala kept 338 people under observation, 17 of them in isolation. After undergoing treatment for 54 days at a private hospital, the 23-year-old student was discharged. On 23 July, the Kerala government declared Ernakulam district to be Nipah-free.
- 2021: September: 12-year-old boy, a native of Chathamangalam village was admitted to a hospital at Kozhikode in Kerala on 1 September. He died from the virus four days after admission. Two healthcare workers who came into contact with the victim were already showing symptoms of Nipah infection by Monday.
- 2023: Since 4 January 2023 and as of 13 February 2023, 11 cases (10 confirmed and one probable), including eight deaths (Case Fatality Rate (CFR) 73%), have been reported in Bangladesh. WHO assesses the ongoing risk as high at the national level.
- 2023: September: Kozhikode district, Kerala, India: As of 14 September 2023, five cases, including two deaths, were confirmed in Kozhikode district in Kerala. The government has prepared a contact list of over 700 people linked to the two deaths, of whom two family members and a healthcare worker tested positive for the virus.
- 2024: July: One person died and 60 were identified as at risk of infection in Malappuram district, Kerala, India.
- 2026: January: The health authorities in West Bengal, India, responded to a confirmed Nipah virus outbreak following the report of five cases, including healthcare workers, as the outbreak placed multiple Asian countries on high alert, prompting enhanced screening and surveillance measures in the region due to the virus's high fatality rate.

== Research ==
Ribavirin, m102.4 monoclonal antibody, and favipiravir were being studied as treatments as of 2019.

=== Medication ===
Ribavirin has been studied in a small number of people. As of 2011, it was unclear whether it was useful, although a few people had returned to normal life after treatment. In vitro studies and animal studies have shown conflicting results in the efficacy of ribavirin against NiV and Hendra, with some studies showing effective inhibition of viral replication in cell lines, whereas some studies in animal models showed that ribavirin treatment only delayed but did not prevent death after NiV or Hendra virus infection.

In 2013, the anti-malarial drug chloroquine was shown to block the critical functions needed for maturation of Nipah virus, although no clinical benefit was observed.

=== Immunization ===
Passive immunization using a human monoclonal antibody, m102.4, that targets the ephrin-B2 and ephrin-B3 receptor-binding domain of the henipavirus Nipah G glycoprotein was evaluated in the ferret model as post-exposure prophylaxis. m102.4 has been used in people on a compassionate use basis in Australia, and was in pre-clinical development in 2013.

== Society and culture ==
The fictional MEV-1 virus featured in the 2011 film Contagion was based on a combination of Nipah and measles virus.

A Malayalam movie, Virus, was released in 2019, based on the 2018 outbreak of Nipah virus in Kerala, India.

In series 4 episode 1 of The Good Karma Hospital, a patient is admitted with Nipah.

Episode 7 of the Korean drama Doctor John also features a Nipah virus outbreak.

== See also ==
- Coalition for Epidemic Preparedness Innovations

== One Health approach ==
Nipah virus infection is widely recognized as a One Health disease because transmission occurs through interactions among wildlife, domestic animals, humans, and the environment.

Fruit bats of the family Pteropodidae, particularly flying foxes of the genus Pteropus, serve as the natural reservoir of Nipah virus. Spillover of the virus to humans may occur directly from bats or indirectly through infected domestic animals such as pigs. Human activities including agricultural expansion, deforestation, and increased contact between wildlife, livestock, and people contribute to the emergence and spread of the disease.

A One Health approach emphasizes collaboration among physicians, veterinarians, wildlife experts, environmental scientists, and public health authorities to improve disease surveillance, outbreak response, wildlife monitoring, livestock management, and community education.

== Environmental risk factors ==
Environmental change plays an important role in the emergence of Nipah virus infection. Deforestation, habitat fragmentation, urban expansion, and agricultural intensification have altered the natural habitats of fruit bats, increasing opportunities for contact between bats, domestic animals, and humans.

Consumption of food contaminated by bat saliva or urine, including raw date palm sap in some endemic regions, has been identified as an important route of transmission. Public health interventions therefore include protecting food sources from bat contamination and educating communities about methods to reduce exposure.

== Prevention and surveillance ==
Preventing Nipah virus infection requires integrated surveillance of human, animal, and wildlife populations. Measures include limiting exposure to infected animals, preventing contamination of food by bats, improving farm biosecurity, rapidly identifying suspected human cases, and strengthening laboratory diagnostic capacity.

The World Health Organization and the World Organisation for Animal Health recommend coordinated surveillance, risk communication, and multidisciplinary collaboration as key components of outbreak preparedness and response.

== Climate change ==
Climate change and environmental degradation may influence the emergence of Nipah virus by altering bat distribution, migration patterns, food availability, and interactions among wildlife, livestock, and humans. Researchers continue to investigate how changing ecosystems contribute to the risk of future outbreaks and emphasize the importance of environmental conservation as part of disease prevention strategies.
