= List of West Nile virus outbreaks =

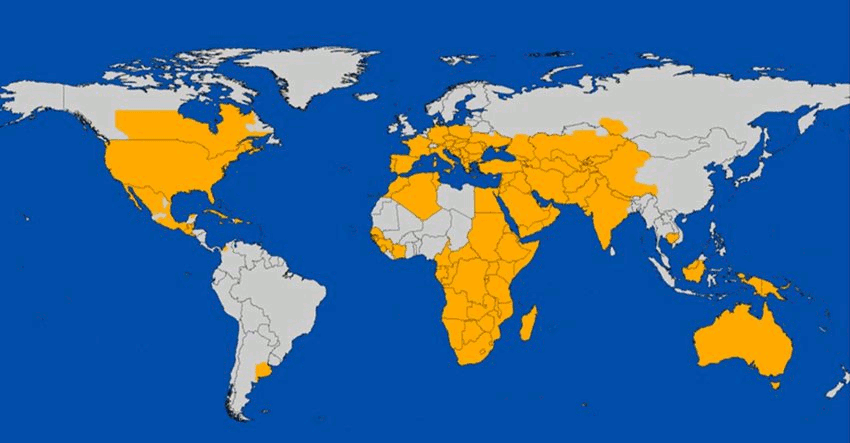
Global distribution of West Nile virus.(2006)

The West Nile virus has caused outbreaks of West Nile fever in countries on a number of continents since its discovery in 1937 in Uganda.

== United States ==
The first cases of West Nile disease in the United States occurred in 1999 in New York. In the first three years only a small number of human cases were diagnosed, all in the Eastern or Southern U.S. (149 cases and 19 deaths, 1999–2001). In 2002, the disease exploded to most of the lower 48 states, causing 4,156 diagnosed cases of which 284 died. The disease continued to spread, reaching all but three states by 2006. The first case detected in Maine occurred in 2012. The single cases detected in Hawaii in 2014 and in Alaska in 2018 were likely imported.

In the period from 1999 to 2018, the United States had 2,330 total deaths out of 50,830 diagnosed cases, giving a case fatality rate of 5%. The worst years were 2003 for the most cases with 9,862 and 2012 for the most deaths with 286. Most cases are thought to go undiagnosed. The WHO claims that about 80% of cases are asymptomatic. Half of all cases (48.5%) diagnosed in the U.S. lead to neuroinvasive symptoms. Over 90% of deaths occurred in cases with neuroinvasive disease. After several cases of West Nile disease transmitted by blood transfusion, the U.S. began testing all blood donations and dozens of presumed cases are found each year. Some West Nile cases resulted from organ transplants and some but not all organs/donors are tested.

As of 2020, the disease outbreak is considered ongoing and essentially endemic. As well as humans, countless birds and over 27,000 horses have been infected, providing additional reservoirs for the virus.

== Canada ==
One human death occurred in 1999. In 2002, ten human deaths out of 416 confirmed and probable cases were reported by Canadian health officials. In 2003, 14 deaths and 1,494 confirmed and probable cases were reported. Cases were reported in 2003 in Nova Scotia, Quebec, Ontario, Manitoba, Saskatchewan, Alberta, British Columbia, and the Yukon. In 2004, only 26 cases were reported and two deaths; however, 2005 saw 239 cases and 12 deaths. By October 28, 2006, 127 cases and no deaths had been reported. One case was asymptomatic and only discovered through a blood donation. In 2007, 445 Manitobans had confirmed cases of WNV and two people died with a third unconfirmed but suspected. Summer of 2012 saw widespread viral penetration in Canada, coast to coast. 17 people have either tested positive or are suspected of having the virus in Saskatchewan, and only one person has tested positive in Alberta. Saskatchewan has reported 826 cases of WNV plus three deaths. The spread of West Nile Virus infected mosquitoes to British Columbia for the first time was reported in 2009.

== Europe and Asia ==
- Israel: In the year 2000, the CDC found 417 confirmed cases with 326 hospitalizations; 33 of these people died. The main clinical presentations were encephalitis (57.9%), febrile disease (24.4%), and meningitis (15.9%).
- Romania: In 1996, more than 800 cases of neuroinvasive disease were reported, 393 of which were confirmed to be caused by West Nile virus. During the outbreak, 17 deaths were reported. In 2010 from July to October, an outbreak occurred with 57 cases and 5 deaths.
- Greece: In the summer of 2010, several cases were reported mainly in northern Greece, a countrywide total of 262 diagnosed cases and 35 fatalities. In 2011 the virus spread to central Greece but with fewer cases, 101 diagnosed and 9 fatalities. In 2012, 44 were diagnosed and 3 died. The total number of people in Greece infected by the virus is estimated to 1,800. In 2013, 35 diagnosed and 1 died.
- Italy: On 30 July 2018, a man died and 12 others were hospitalized after they contracted the virus.
- Spain: In the summer of 2020, seven people died and 31 were hospitalized, all of them in the Autonomous Community of Andalusia, after they contracted the virus in the worst outbreak of it in the history of the country.

West Nile Virus cases in the European Union
Year	Infections	Deaths
2010	319	40
2011	125	≥9
2012	267	≥3
2013	273	≥1
2014	75	
2015	122	2
2016	226	27
2017	201	25
2018	1549	166
2019	425	52
2020	316	37
2021	139	9
2022	394	21
2023	707	67
