= Maguari virus =

Virus classification
- (unranked): Virus
- Realm: Riboviria
- Kingdom: Orthornavirae
- Phylum: Negarnaviricota
- Class: Bunyaviricetes
- Order: Elliovirales
- Family: Peribunyaviridae
- Genus: Orthobunyavirus
- Species: Orthobunyavirus maguariense

Synonyms
- Maguari orthobunyavirus

Species of virus

Maguari virus, abbreviated MAGV, is a negative-sense, single-stranded RNA virus in the Peribunyaviridae family, genus Orthobunyavirus, Bunyamwera serogroup, that has been shown to be capable of causing human disease. MAGV is related to Cache Valley virus and Tensaw virus.

In addition to humans, MAGV has been isolated from mosquitoes, horses, cattle, sheep, birds, and rodents. The mosquito species include Aedes fulvus, Aedes scapularis, Aedes serratus, Culex taeniopus, and species in the genera Anopheles, Wyeomyia, and Psorophora.

MAGV's geographic range includes Argentina, Brazil, Colombia, French Guiana, Guyana, and Peru.; it has not been isolated north of Trinidad. The presence of antibodies to Maguari virus in human residents of south Florida can be attributed to either cross-reactivity with Tensaw virus, or cross-reactivity to an antigenic subtype or variant of Tensaw virus, although it is possible that another, undescribed, Bunyamwera serogroup virus may exist in south Florida.
