= Ngari virus =

Virus classification
- (unranked): Virus
- Realm: Riboviria
- Kingdom: Orthornavirae
- Phylum: Negarnaviricota
- Class: Bunyaviricetes
- Order: Elliovirales
- Family: Peribunyaviridae
- Genus: Orthobunyavirus
- Species: Bunyamwera orthobunyavirus
- Virus: Ngari virus

RNA virus

Ngari virus (NRIV) is a single-stranded, negative sense, tri-segmented RNA virus. It is a subtype of the Bunyamwera virus (BUNV) and closely related to the Batai virus (BATV). NRIV is the only reassortment virus of the subtypes. There is evidence suggesting that NRIV stems from a naturally occurring reassortment event in which a host was infected with both BUNV and BATV. It is commonly found in areas that experience an outbreak of Rift Valley fever virus (RVFV)

== Transmission ==
The primary form of transmission of the virus to humans is through mosquitos. Although mosquitos are the primary source, the virus was also detected in Ixodid ticks found on cattle in Guinea but there is no evidence indicating that they are able to spread the virus. Furthermore, the virus has previously been found within goats and sheep in Mauritania.

== Geography ==
The virus has been reported primarily in African countries which include Mauritania, Senegal, Sudan, Central African Republic, DRC, Kenya, Somalia, South Africa, and Madagascar.

== Effects in Humans ==
Humans that are infected by the virus typically develop severe or fatal hemorrhagic fever.

== History ==
Ngari virus was first isolated in Senegal in 1979 from Aedes simpsoni mosquitos.
