= Fort Sherman virus =

Virus classification
- (unranked): Virus
- Realm: Riboviria
- Kingdom: Orthornavirae
- Phylum: Negarnaviricota
- Class: Bunyaviricetes
- Order: Elliovirales
- Family: Peribunyaviridae
- Genus: Orthobunyavirus
- Species: Orthobunyavirus shermanense

RNA virus

Fort Sherman virus (FSV) is a single-stranded, negative sense, tri-segmented RNA virus. The virus is closely related to Cache Valley virus (CVV). There are multiple strains of the virus, each with individual characteristics including the Panama, Brazil, and Argentina strains. Of the three strains, the Panama strain is the only reassortment of them. Research suggests reassortment during the genealogy of the Panama strain. This was found while analyzing the M segment of the virus in which the Brazil and Argentina strains closely matched while the Panama strain matched closely with CVV. The L and S segments matched closely for all three strains.

== Transmission ==
Three different species have been found to contain Fort Sherman virus which are humans, horses, and mosquitos. Currently, it is unknown whether the divergent South American strains of the virus are able to be transmitted to humans.

== Symptoms ==
Symptoms in humans include fever, muscle pain, sore throat, and malaise.

== Geography ==
Fort Sherman virus is found in a geographic range of more than 7,000 km, solely in South America. Countries containing the virus include Panama, Brazil, and Argentina.

== History ==
The Fort Sherman virus was first isolated in 1985 by Joseph A. Mangiafico from a 36 year-old male US soldier in Panama.
