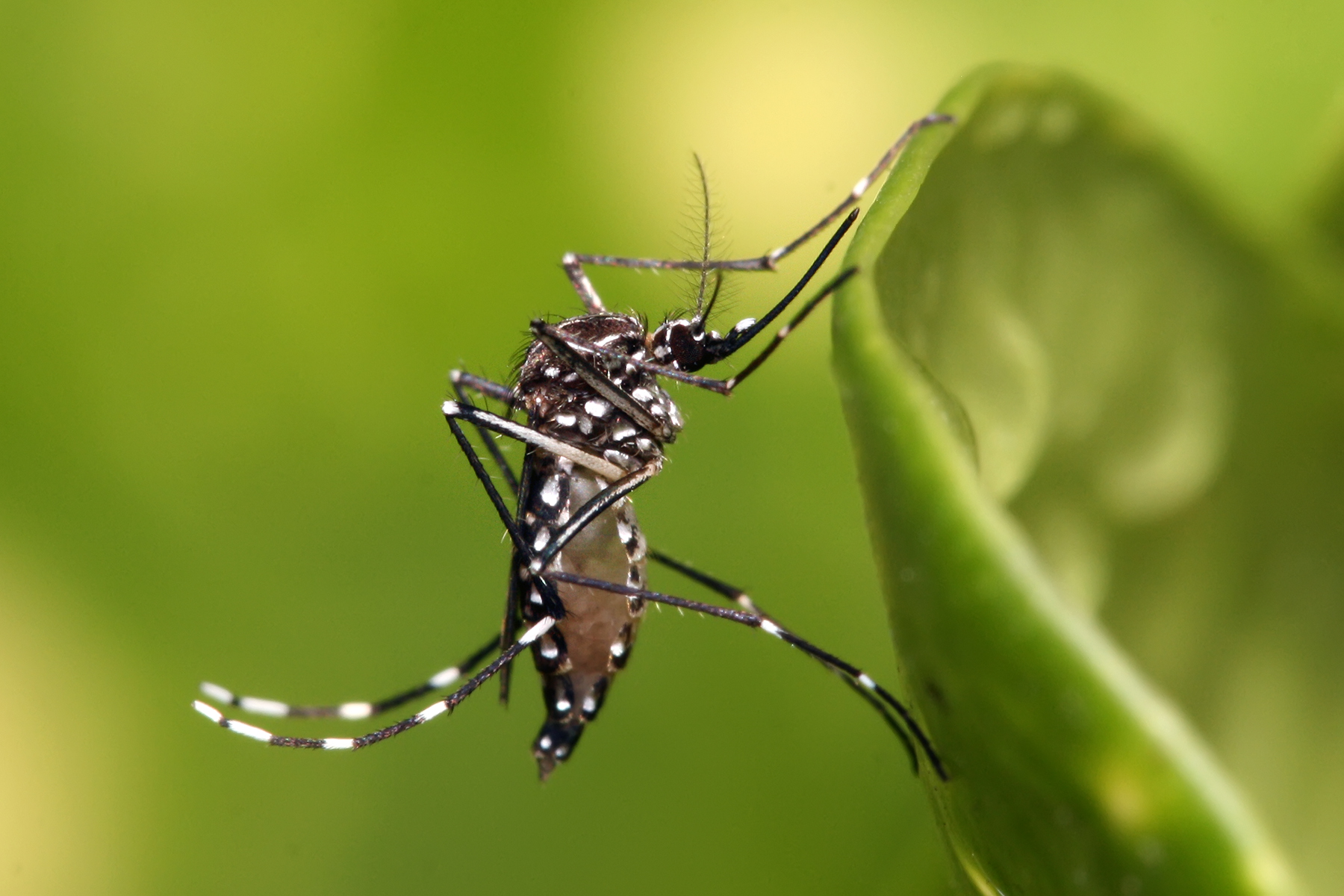
- Adult
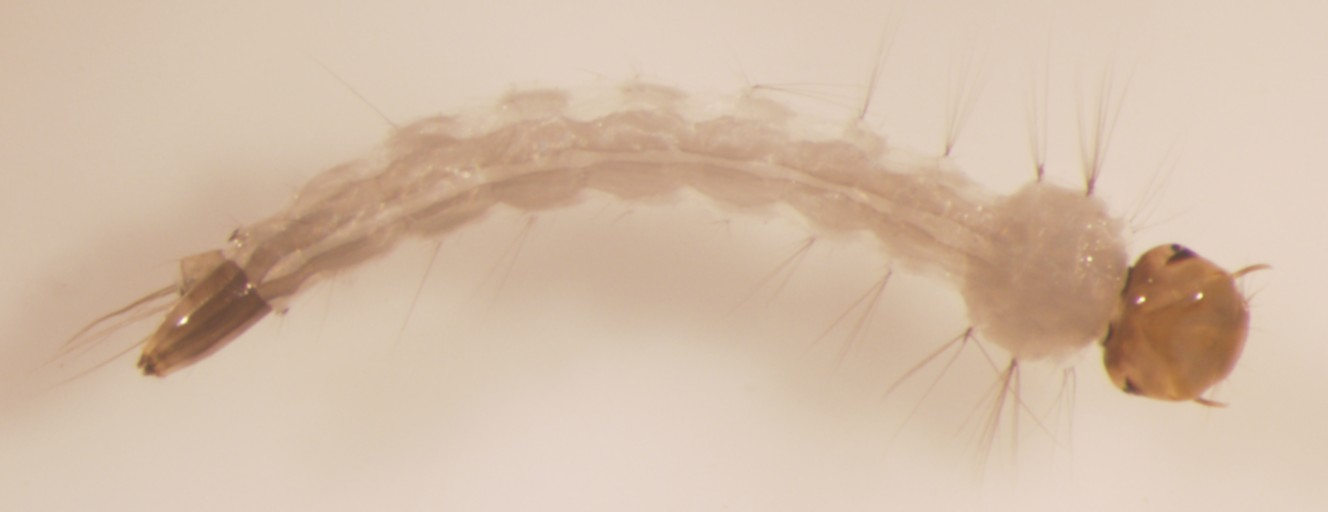
- Larva

Scientific classification
- Kingdom: Animalia
- Phylum: Arthropoda
- Clade: Pancrustacea
- Class: Insecta
- Order: Diptera
- Family: Culicidae
- Genus: Aedes
- Subgenus: Stegomyia
- Species: A. aegypti

Binomial name
- Aedes aegypti (Linnaeus in Hasselquist, 1762)

Subspecies
- Aedes aegypti aegypti; Aedes aegypti formosus
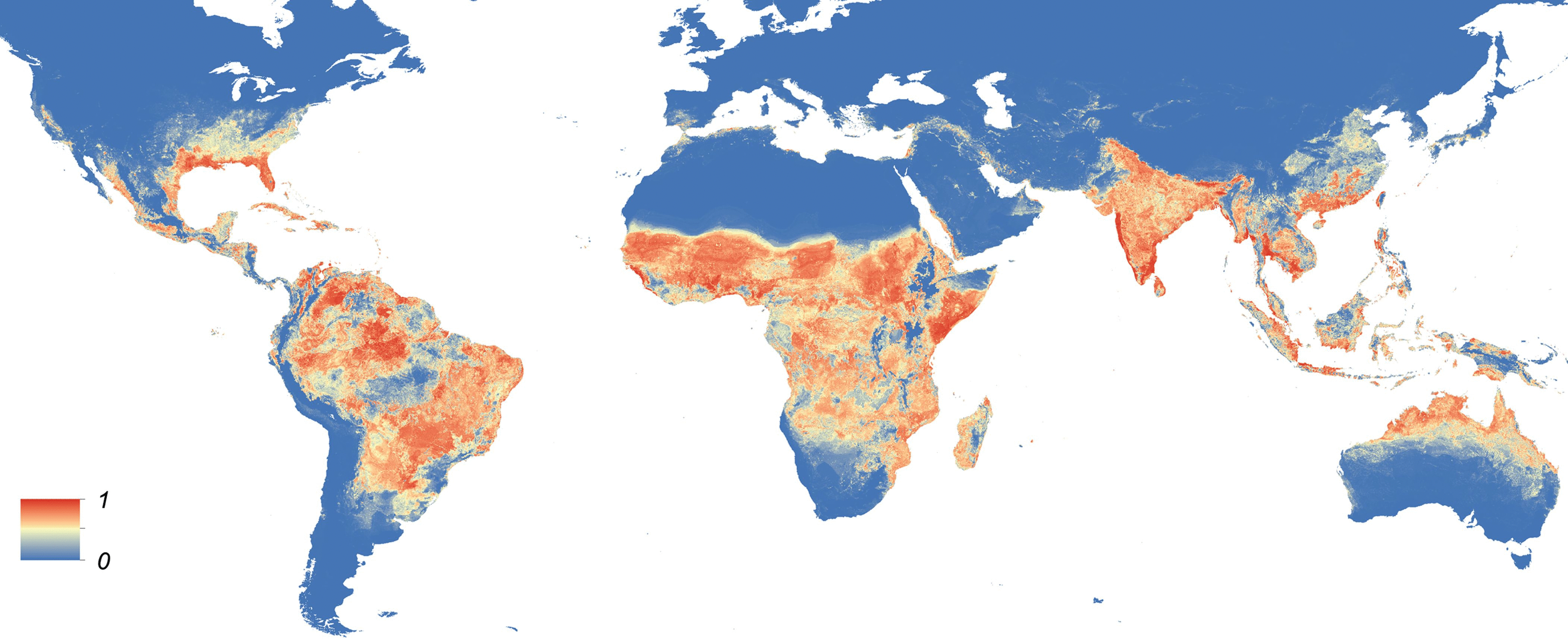
- Global Aedes aegypti predicted distribution in 2015 (blue=absent, red=present)

Synonyms
- Culex aegypti Linnaeus in Hasselquist, 1762; Culex fasciatus Fabricius, 1805; Culex bancrofti Skuse, 1889

= Aedes aegypti =

Yellow fever mosquito

Species of mosquito

Aedes aegypti (/ˈiːdiːz eɪˈdʒɪpti/; US: /eɪdz -, ˈeɪdiːz -/; from Ancient Greek αηδής (aēdḗs) 'unpleasant' and Latin aegyptī 'Egyptian') – sometimes called the yellow fever mosquito – is a mosquito that spreads diseases such as dengue fever, yellow fever, and chikungunya. The mosquito can be recognized by black and white markings on its legs and a marking in the form of a lyre on the upper surface of its thorax. The mosquito is native to north Africa, but is now a common invasive species that has spread to tropical, subtropical, and temperate regions throughout the world. It was spread to the New World through the slave trade, and is considered to be among the most widespread mosquito species.

== Biology ==
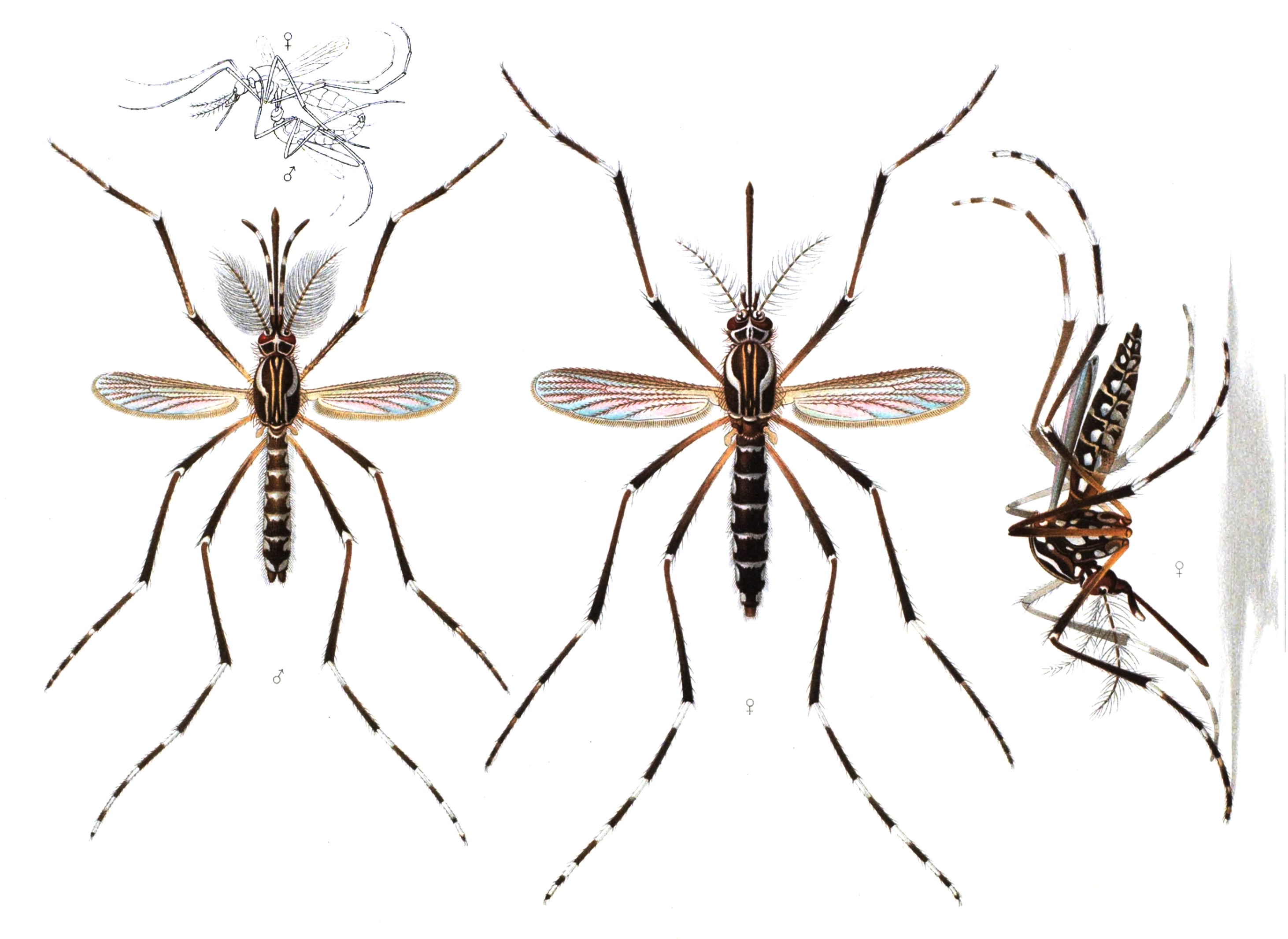
Male (left) and female (center and right) Ae. aegypti E.A. Goeldi, 1905

Aedes aegypti is a 4-to-7-millimetre-long (5/32 to 35/128 in), dark mosquito which can be recognized by white markings on its legs and a marking in the form of a lyre on the upper surface of its thorax. Females are larger than males. Microscopically females possess small palps tipped with silver or white scales, and their antennae have sparse short hairs, whereas those of males are feathery. Aedes aegypti can be confused with Aedes albopictus without a magnifying glass: the latter have a white stripe on the top of their scutum.

Males live off fruit and only the female bites for blood, which she needs to mature her eggs. To find a host, she is attracted to chemical compounds emitted by mammals, including ammonia, carbon dioxide, lactic acid, and octenol. Scientists at The United States Department of Agriculture (USDA) Agricultural Research Service studied the specific chemical structure of octenol to better understand why this chemical attracts the mosquito to its host and found the mosquito has a preference for "right-handed" (dextrorotatory) octenol molecules. The preference for biting humans is dependent on expression of the odorant receptor AaegOr4. The white eggs are laid separately into water and soon turn black. The larvae initially feed on bacteria and tiny organic particles, growing over a period of weeks through four larval instars until reaching the pupa stage.

The lifespan of an adult Ae. aegypti is two to four weeks depending on conditions, but the eggs can be viable for over a year in a dry state, which allows the mosquito to re-emerge after a cold winter or dry spell.

== Hosts ==
Female Aedes aegypti mosquitoes feed primarily on human blood and are considered highly anthropophilic, meaning that they show a strong preference for humans as hosts. This feeding preference contributes to the species' importance in the transmission of human pathogens, including dengue, Zika, chikungunya, and yellow fever viruses.

Although humans are the principal hosts, A. aegypti can also feed on other vertebrates, including dogs, pigs, cattle, cats, rodents, and birds. The proportion of blood meals obtained from non-human animals varies between locations and according to the availability of different hosts. A study conducted in Thailand found that 99% of single-host blood meals identified in A. aegypti came from humans, although blood from several other animals was also detected. Research in the Florida Keys similarly found that humans were the predominant blood source, accounting for 79.6% of identified blood meals in mosquitoes collected in Key West and 69.5% in the surrounding area.

Both male and female A. aegypti can obtain energy from plant sugars, such as nectar, but females require blood meals to obtain nutrients needed for egg production. The species' tendency to feed on humans, particularly in and around human dwellings, increases opportunities for transmission of pathogens between people.

== Distribution ==
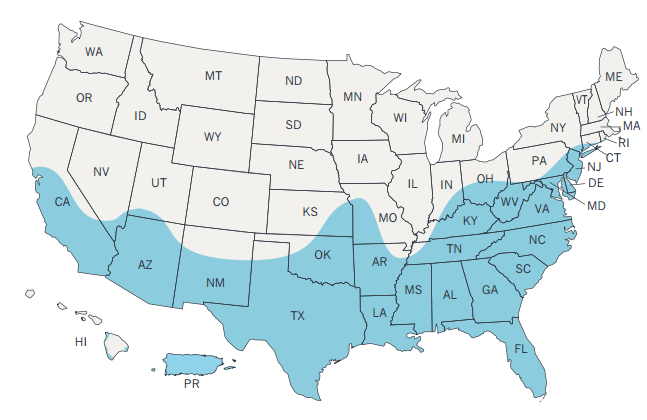
Ae. aegypti mosquito distribution in the United States, 2016

Aedes aegypti originated in Africa and was spread to the New World through the slave trade. It is now found in tropical, subtropical and temperate regions throughout the world. Ae. aegypti's distribution has increased in the past two to three decades worldwide, and it is considered to be among the most widespread mosquito species.

Studies in the Caribbean have documented the presence of Aedes aegypti in several island settings. In Grenada, researchers collected 1,152 A. aegypti mosquitoes from six semi-rural locations in St. George Parish between January and December 2018, using traps placed near houses. In Trinidad, a 53-week study conducted in high-rise apartments in Port of Spain during 1999–2000 detected A. aegypti eggs at multiple building elevations, demonstrating that the species was present in densely populated urban environments. More recently, a survey conducted in Puerto Rico in June 2025 detected adult mosquitoes or immature stages of A. aegypti in 43 municipalities, including ten municipalities without previously published occurrence records. These studies provide documented evidence of the species' distribution across different Caribbean environments, from semi-rural communities in Grenada to urban residential areas in Trinidad and multiple municipalities in Puerto Rico.

In 2016, Zika virus-capable mosquito populations have been found adapting for persistence in warm temperate climates. Such a population has been identified to exist in parts of Washington, DC, and genetic evidence suggests they survived at least the last four winters in the region. One of the study researchers noted, "...some mosquito species are finding ways to survive in normally restrictive environments by taking advantage of underground refugia". As the world's climate becomes warmer, the range of Aedes aegypti and a hardier species originating in Asia, the tiger mosquito Aedes albopictus, which can expand its range to relatively cooler climates, will inexorably spread north and south. Sadie Ryan of the University of Florida was the lead author in a 2019 study that estimated the vulnerability of naïve populations in geographic regions that currently do not harbor vectors i.e., for Zika in the Old World. Ryan's co-author, Georgetown University's Colin Carlson remarked, "Plain and simple, climate change is going to kill a lot of people." As of 2020, the Northern Territory Government Australia and the Darwin City Council have recommended tropical cities initiate rectification programs to rid their cities of potential mosquito breeding stormwater sumps. A 2019 study found that accelerating urbanization and human movement would also contribute to the spread of Aedes mosquitoes.

In continental Europe, Aedes aegypti is not established but it has been found in localities close to Europe such as the Asian part of Turkey. However, a single adult female specimen was found in Marseille (Southern France) in 2018. On the basis of a genetic study and an analysis of the movements of commercial ships, the origin of the specimen could be traced as coming from Cameroon, in Central Africa.

== Genomics ==
In 2007, the genome of Aedes aegypti was published, after it had been sequenced and analyzed by a consortium including scientists at The Institute for Genomic Research (now part of the J. Craig Venter Institute), the European Bioinformatics Institute, the Broad Institute, and the University of Notre Dame. The effort in sequencing its DNA was intended to provide new avenues for research into insecticides and possible genetic modification to prevent the spread of virus. This was the second mosquito species to have its genome sequenced in full (the first was Anopheles gambiae). The published data included the 1.38 billion base pairs containing the insect's estimated 15,419 protein-encoding genes. The sequence indicates the species diverged from Drosophila melanogaster (the common fruit fly) about 250 million years ago, and Anopheles gambiae and this species diverged about 150 million years ago. Matthews et al., 2018 finds A. aegypti to carry a large and diverse number of transposable elements. Their analysis suggests this is common to all mosquitoes.

== Vector of disease ==
Aedes aegypti is a vector for transmitting numerous pathogens. According to the Walter Reed Biosystematics Unit, as of 2022, it is associated with the following 54 viruses and two species of Plasmodium:

Aino virus (AINOV), African horse sickness virus (AHSV), Bozo virus (BOZOV), Bussuquara virus (BSQV), Bunyamwera virus (BUNV), Catu virus (CATUV), Chikungunya virus (CHIKV), Chandipura vesiculovirus (CHPV), Cypovirus (unnamed), Cache Valley virus (CVV), Dengue virus (DENV), Eastern equine encephalitis virus (EEEV), Epizootic hemorrhagic disease virus (EHDV), Guaroa virus (GROV), Hart Park virus (HPV), Ilheus virus (ILHV), Irituia virus (IRIV), Israel turkey meningoencephalitis virus (ITV), Japanaut virus (JAPV), Joinjakaka (JOIV), Japanese encephalitis virus (JBEV), Ketapang virus (KETV), Kunjin virus (KUNV), La Crosse virus (LACV), Mayaro virus (MAYV), Marburg virus (MBGV), Marco virus (MCOV), Melao virus (MELV), Marituba virus (MTBV), Mount Elgon bat virus (MEBV), Mucambo virus (MUCV), Murray Valley encephalitis virus (MVEV), Navarro virus (NAVV), Nepuyo virus (NEPV), Nola virus (NOLV), Ntaya virus (NTAV), Oriboca virus (ORIV), Orungo virus (ORUV), Restan virus (RESV), Rift Valley fever virus (RVFV), Semliki Forest virus (SFV), Sindbis virus (SINV), Tahyna virus (TAHV), Tsuruse virus (TSUV), Tyuleniy virus (TYUV), Venezuelan equine encephalitis virus (VEEV), Vesicular stomatitis virus (Indiana serotype), Warrego virus (WARV), West Nile virus (WNV), Wesselsbron virus (WSLV), Yaounde virus (YAOV), Yellow fever virus (YFV), Zegla virus (ZEGV), Zika virus, as well as Plasmodium gallinaceum and Plasmodium lophurae.

This mosquito also mechanically transmits some veterinary diseases. In 1952 Fenner et al., found it transmitting the myxoma virus between rabbits and in 2001 Chihota et al., the lumpy skin disease virus between cattle.

The yellow fever mosquito can contribute to the spread of reticular cell sarcoma among Syrian hamsters.

== Bite prevention methods ==
The Centers for Disease Control and Prevention traveler's page on preventing dengue fever suggests using mosquito repellents that contain DEET (N, N-diethylmetatoluamide, 20% to 30%). It also suggests:

1. Although Aedes aegypti mosquitoes most commonly feed at dusk and dawn, indoors, in shady areas, or when the weather is cloudy, "they can bite and spread infection all year long and at any time of day."
2. Once a week, scrub off eggs sticking to wet containers, seal or discard them. The mosquitoes prefer to breed in areas of stagnant water, such as flower vases, uncovered barrels, buckets, and discarded tires, but the most dangerous areas are wet shower floors and toilet tanks, as they allow the mosquitos to breed in the residence. Research has shown that certain chemicals emanating from bacteria in water containers stimulate the female mosquitoes to lay their eggs. They are particularly motivated to lay eggs in water containers that have the correct amounts of specific fatty acids associated with bacteria involved in the degradation of leaves and other organic matter in water. The chemicals associated with the microbial stew are far more stimulating to discerning female mosquitoes than plain or filtered water in which the bacteria once lived.
3. Wear long-sleeved clothing and long pants when outdoors during the day and evening.
4. Use mosquito netting over the bed if the bedroom is not air conditioned or screened, and for additional protection, treat the mosquito netting with the insecticide permethrin.

Insect repellents containing DEET (particularly concentrated products) or p-menthane-3,8-diol (from lemon eucalyptus) were effective in repelling Ae. aegypti mosquitoes, while others were less effective or ineffective in a scientific study. The Centers for Disease Control and Prevention article on "Protection against Mosquitoes, Ticks, & Other Arthropods" notes that "Studies suggest that concentrations of DEET above approximately 50% do not offer a marked increase in protection time against mosquitoes; DEET efficacy tends to plateau at a concentration of approximately 50%". Other insect repellents recommended by the CDC include Picaridin (KBR 3023/icaridin), IR3535, and 2-undecanone.

== Population control efforts ==
A One Health approach to controlling Aedes aegypti recognises the connections between human health, environmental conditions, and mosquito ecology. Effective prevention requires collaboration among public health authorities, environmental and sanitation services, researchers, and local communities. Disease surveillance can help identify areas at risk of mosquito-borne disease, while environmental management and community participation can reduce mosquito populations and the risk of transmission. Biological control methods, including the use of Wolbachia, can complement conventional mosquito-control measures. Integrating surveillance, environmental management, and appropriate control methods can support a more coordinated approach to preventing mosquito-borne diseases.

=== Insecticides ===
Pyrethroids are commonly used. This widespread use of pyrethroids and DDT has caused knockdown resistance (kdr) mutations. Almost no research has been done on the fitness implications. Studies by Kumar et al., 2009 on deltamethrin in India, Plernsub et al., 2013 on permethrin in Thailand, by Jaramillo-O et al., 2014 on λ-cyhalothrin in Colombia, by Alvarez-Gonzalez et al., 2017 on deltamethrin in Venezuela, are all substantially confounded. As of 2019, understanding of selective pressure under withdrawal of insecticide is hence limited.

=== Genetic modification ===
Ae. aegypti has been genetically modified to suppress its own species in an approach similar to the sterile insect technique, thereby reducing the risk of disease. The mosquitoes, known as OX513A, were developed by Oxitec, a spinout of Oxford University. Field trials in the Cayman Islands, in Juazeiro, Brazil, by Carvalho et al., 2015, and in Panama by Neira et al., 2014 have shown that the OX513A mosquitoes reduced the target mosquito populations by more than 90%. This mosquito suppression effect is achieved by a self-limiting gene that prevents the offspring from surviving. Male modified mosquitoes, which do not bite or spread disease, are released to mate with the pest females. Their offspring inherit the self-limiting gene and die before reaching adulthood—before they can reproduce or spread disease. The OX513A mosquitoes and their offspring also carry a fluorescent marker for simple monitoring. To produce more OX513A mosquitoes for control projects, the self-limiting gene is switched off (using the Tet-Off system) in the mosquito production facility using an antidote (the antibiotic tetracycline), allowing the mosquitoes to reproduce naturally. In the environment, the antidote is unavailable to rescue mosquito reproduction, so the pest population is suppressed.

The mosquito control effect is nontoxic and species-specific, as the OX513A mosquitoes are Ae. aegypti and only breed with Ae. aegypti. The result of the self-limiting approach is that the released insects and their offspring die and do not persist in the environment.

In Brazil, the modified mosquitoes were approved by the National Biosecurity Technical Commission for releases throughout the country. Insects were released into the wild populations of Brazil, Malaysia, and the Cayman Islands in 2012. In July 2015, the city of Piracicaba, São Paulo, started releasing the OX513A mosquitoes. In 2015, the UK House of Lords called on the government to support more work on genetically modified insects in the interest of global health. In 2016, the United States Food and Drug Administration granted preliminary approval for the use of modified mosquitoes to prevent the spread of the Zika virus.

Another proposed method consists in using radiation to sterilize male larvae so that when they mate, they produce no progeny. Male mosquitoes do not bite or spread disease.

Using CRISPR/Cas9 based genome editing to engineer the genome of Aedes aegypti genes like ECFP (enhanced cyan fluorescent protein), Nix (male-determining factor gene), Aaeg-wtrw (Ae. aegypti water witch locus), Kmo (kynurenine 3-monoxygenase), loqs (loquacious), r2d2 (r2d2 protein), ku70 (ku heterodimer protein gene) and lig4 (ligase4) were targeted to modify the genome of Aedes aegypti. The new mutant will become incapable of pathogen transmission or result in population control.

=== Infection with Wolbachia ===
In 2016 research into the use of a bacterium called Wolbachia as a method of biocontrol was published showing that invasion of Ae. aegypti by the endosymbiotic bacteria allows mosquitos to be resistant to certain arboviruses such as dengue fever and Zika virus strains currently circulating. In 2017 Alphabet, Inc. started the Debug Project to infect males of this species with Wolbachia bacteria, interrupting the reproductive cycle of these animals.

=== Fungus infection ===
Fungal species Erynia conica (from the family Entomophthoraceae) infects (and kills) two types of mosquitos: Aedes aegypti and Culex restuans. Studies on the fungus have been carried out on its potential use as a biological control of the mosquitos.

== Taxonomy ==
The species was first named (as Culex aegypti) in 1757 by Fredric Hasselquist in his treatise Iter Palaestinum. Hasselquist was provided with the names and descriptions by his mentor, Carl Linnaeus. This work was later translated into German and published in 1762 as Reise nach Palästina.

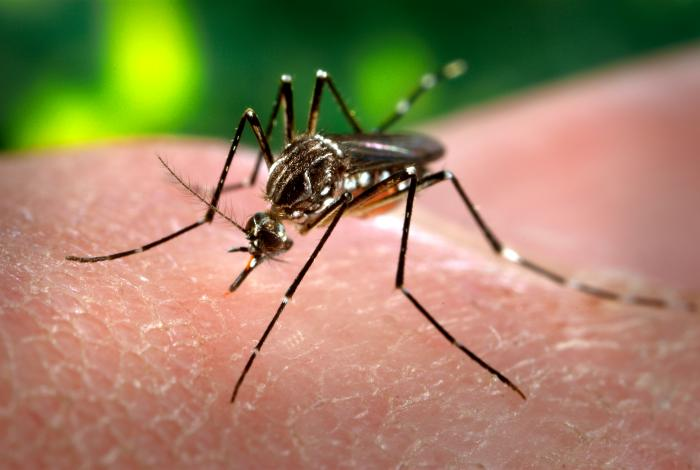
Ae. aegypti feeding on a human

To stabilise the nomenclature, a petition to the International Commission on Zoological Nomenclature was made by P. F. Mattingly, Alan Stone, and Kenneth L. Knight in 1962. It also transpired that, although the name Aedes aegypti was universally used for the yellow fever mosquito, Linnaeus had actually described a species now known as Aedes (Ochlerotatus) caspius. In 1964, the commission ruled in favour of the proposal, validating Linnaeus' name, and transferring it to the species for which it was in general use.

The yellow fever mosquito belongs to the tribe Aedini of the dipteran family Culicidae and to the genus Aedes and subgenus Stegomyia. According to one recent analysis, the subgenus Stegomyia of the genus Aedes should be raised to the level of genus. The proposed name change has been ignored by most scientists; at least one scientific journal, the Journal of Medical Entomology, has officially encouraged authors dealing with aedile mosquitoes to continue to use the traditional names, unless they have particular reasons for not doing so. The generic name comes from the Ancient Greek ἀηδής, aēdēs, meaning "unpleasant" or "odious".

=== Subspecies ===
Two subspecies are commonly recognized:

- Aedes aegypti subsp. aegypti
- Aedes aegypti subsp. formosus

This classification is complicated by the results of Gloria-Soria et al., 2016. Although confirming the existence of these two major subspecies, Gloria-Sora et al. finds greater worldwide diversity than previously recognized and a large number of distinct populations separated by various geographic factors. Aedes aegypti formosus is found in natural habitats such as forests, while Aedes aegypti aegypti has adapted to urban domestic habitats.
