= Lokern virus =

Virus classification
- (unranked): Virus
- Realm: Riboviria
- Kingdom: Orthornavirae
- Phylum: Negarnaviricota
- Class: Bunyaviricetes
- Order: Elliovirales
- Family: Peribunyaviridae
- Genus: Orthobunyavirus
- Species: Bunyamwera orthobunyavirus
- Virus: Lokern virus

RNA virus

Lokern virus (LOKV) is a single-stranded, negative sense, tri-segmented RNA virus. It is a subtype of the Bunyamwera virus (BUNV) and closely related to the Main Drain virus (MDV). The virus is a natural reassortment that received its S and L segments from MDV while its M segment shows a relatively low percentage of nucleotide identity in relation to any other orthobunyavirus, suggesting it came from an unknown or extinct virus.

== Transmission ==
The primary form of transmission for LOKV is through mosquitoes. Multiple species of mosquitoes have been discovered with the ability to transmit the virus including Culex tarsalis, Aedes nigromaculis, Aedes melanimon, Culiseta inornata, and Culicoides variipennis. Other than mosquitoes, the virus has been found in horses, cows, and dogs in Mexico.

== Geography ==
Lokern virus has been found throughout Mexico and the western United States. Additional isolates have been discovered in Texas and Colorado from mosquitoes and culicoides, respectively. Other states that have shown a presence of the virus include New Mexico and Utah. A study conducted in Mexico also found horses, cows, and dogs with lokern virus antibodies present.

== Effects in humans ==
The virus has been poorly studied and the effects of the virus on humans is currently unknown. Antibodies have been found within human patients that lived in the same area that the virus was discovered.

== History ==
Lokern virus was first isolated in 1962 by Robert P. Scrivani in California from Culex tarsalis mosquitoes.
