= Shamonda virus =

RNA virus infecting ruminants

Phylogenetic tree based on the L genomic segment of a Shamonda virus lineage detected in Germany in 2026.

Shamonda virus (SHAV) is a midge-borne RNA virus of the genus Orthobunyavirus in the Simbu serogroup, closely related to Schmallenberg virus and Akabane virus, that primarily infects cattle and other ruminants such as sheep, goats, and alpacas. In dairy cattle it can cause diarrhoea and fever, as well as reduce milk production.

The virus was first isolated in the University of Ibadan in Nigeria in 1965. The name comes from the neighbourhood of Samonda, where the University of Ibadan is located. Since then, it has been found sporadically in Africa and Japan.

On 31 July 2026, a new variant called Shamonda-Europe was identified after disease investigations on cattle farms in Germany and Switzerland, and it subsequently spread to France, Spain, Portugal and other European countries. There are two variants circulating in Europe: SHAV-EU1, first detected in Switzerland, France, and southern Germany, and SHAV-EU2, identified in northwestern Germany.

The first documented human infection by SHAV was reported in France in October 2026. A severely immunocompromised patient in Lyon died after likely acquiring the virus in eastern France from a Culicoides midge bite; the patient was being treated in hospital and diagnosed using metagenomics after all other tests came back negative. Their neurological complications were very likely caused by the virus. Officials stated this was an exceptional case, and there was no identified risk to the general population beyond immunocompromised individuals. The virus had circulated for decades in Asia and Africa, but this was the first case of transmission to humans.
