= Tete virus =

Virus classification
- (unranked): Virus
- Realm: Riboviria
- Kingdom: Orthornavirae
- Phylum: Negarnaviricota
- Class: Bunyaviricetes
- Order: Elliovirales
- Family: Peribunyaviridae
- Genus: Orthobunyavirus
- Species: Orthobunyavirus teteense

Synonyms
- Tete orthobunyavirus

Species of virus

Tete virus is a bunyavirus found originally in Tete Province, Mozambique. It is a disease of animals and humans. Two forms, Bahig and Matruh viruses, were isolated from bird ticks including Hyalomma marginatum, but elsewhere mosquitoes and biting midges have been implicated as vectors.

== Subtypes ==
- Bahig virus
- Matruh virus
- Tete virus SAAn3518
- Tsuruse virus
- Weldona virus

== Literature ==
- Fauquet C, Mayo M, et al. (2005). Eighth Report of the International Committee on Taxonomy of Viruses. Elsevier. S. 704. ISBN 0-12-249951-4.
