= 63U-11 virus =

Virus classification
- (unranked): Virus
- Realm: Riboviria
- Kingdom: Orthornavirae
- Phylum: Negarnaviricota
- Class: Bunyaviricetes
- Order: Elliovirales
- Family: Peribunyaviridae
- Genus: Orthobunyavirus
- Species: Marituba virus
- Strain: 63U-11 virus

Strain of Marituba virus

The 63U-11 virus (63UV) is a strain of Marituba virus (MTBV) in the genus Orthobunyavirus. It can be found in mosquitoes.
