= Abras virus =

Virus classification
- (unranked): Virus
- Realm: Riboviria
- Kingdom: Orthornavirae
- Phylum: Negarnaviricota
- Class: Bunyaviricetes
- Order: Elliovirales
- Family: Peribunyaviridae
- Genus: Orthobunyavirus
- Species: Orthobunyavirus abrasense

Synonyms
- Abras orthobunyavirus

Species of virus

Abras virus (ABRV) is a species of virus in the genus Orthobunyavirus. Isolated from Culex adamesi and C. paracrybda in Ecuador. Not reported to cause disease in humans.
