= Alajuela virus =

Virus classification
- (unranked): Virus
- Realm: Riboviria
- Kingdom: Orthornavirae
- Phylum: Negarnaviricota
- Class: Bunyaviricetes
- Order: Elliovirales
- Family: Peribunyaviridae
- Genus: Orthobunyavirus
- Virus: Alajuela virus

Synonyms
- Alajuela orthobunyavirus

Species of virus

Alajuela virus (ALJV) is a virus in the genus Orthobunyavirus in the Gamboa serogroup. It is isolated from mosquitoes, Aedeomyia squamipennis. It has not been reported to cause disease in humans.
