= Acará virus =

Virus classification
- (unranked): Virus
- Realm: Riboviria
- Kingdom: Orthornavirae
- Phylum: Negarnaviricota
- Class: Bunyaviricetes
- Order: Elliovirales
- Family: Peribunyaviridae
- Genus: Orthobunyavirus
- Species: Orthobunyavirus acaraense

Synonyms
- Acara orthobunyavirus; Acara virus; Moriche virus

Species of virus

Acará virus (ACAV) is a species in the genus Orthobunyavirus, belonging to the Capim serogroup. It is isolated from sentinel mice, Culex species, and the rodent Nectomys squamipes in Pará, Brazil and in Panama. The symptoms of the Acará virus is death. It is sometimes reported to cause disease in humans. They are believed to be spread mainly by the Mosquito species Culex, due to many samples of Acará and other diseases from the Campim serogroup having been isolated from that species.
