= Batai virus =

Virus classification
- (unranked): Virus
- Realm: Riboviria
- Kingdom: Orthornavirae
- Phylum: Negarnaviricota
- Class: Bunyaviricetes
- Order: Elliovirales
- Family: Peribunyaviridae
- Genus: Orthobunyavirus
- Species: Orthobunyavirus bataiense

Synonyms
- Batai orthobunyavirus

Species of virus

Batai virus (BATV) is a RNA virus belonging to the genus Orthobunyavirus.

== Introduction ==
Batai virus (BATV) is an enveloped, single-stranded, negative sense RNA genome. It is a member of the genus Orthobunyavirus. It was first isolated from Culex mosquitoes in Malaysia in 1955. Evidence from serological surveillance and virus isolation shows that this virus is widely distributed around the world. Similar to other orthobunyaviruses it contributes to both human and animal disease. In humans it has been noted in causing severe fever, and in bovines has been associated with premature birth, birth defects, and increased abortion rates. It is transmitted through mosquito bites, ticks, and biting midges, and occurs from cold to tropical regions of Africa, Asia, and Europe.

== Structure ==
The structure of Batai virus (BATV) consists of an enveloped nucleocapsid that is composed of three RNA segments: small (S), medium (M), and large (L). The S segment encodes the nucleocapsid (N) and the non-structural (NSs) proteins. The M segment encodes the virion surface glycoproteins (Gn, Gc) and non-structural proteins (NSm). The L segment encodes for the replicase/ transcriptase L protein. The nonstructural proteins NSm participate in virus assembly and NSs plays a key role in counteracting the host immune response by blocking alpha/beta interferon induction The full-length genome of NM/12 consists of a 947 base pair nucleotide S segment, a 4405 base pair nucleotide M segment, and a 6870 base pair nucleotide L segment. It also contains one open reading frame that encode three proteins of 151, 943, or 1395 amino acids.

Viral enveloped nucleocapsids utilize membrane glycoproteins on their surface to mediate entry into host cells. Averaging of glycoprotein spikes of membrane viruses, such as HIV-1, has been a particularly successful approach for studying their structure. An understanding of the structure is integral for revealing both the molecular basis of virus–host interactions and guiding antiviral and vaccine design development. A software named Jsubtomo enables visualization of the structure of viral glycoprotein spikes to a resolution in the range of 20-40 Å and allows for study of the study of higher order spike-to-spike interactions on the virion membrane.

Extensive research has yet to be performed on the detailed crystalline structure of Batai virus, but research on the closely related Bunyamwera virus has shown a distinct functionality of each of the two nucleocapsid side chains. An N-terminal arm and a C-terminal tail were found to interact with neighboring NP protomers to form a tetrameric ring-shaped organization. Each protomer bound a 10-nucleotide RNA molecule, which was acquired from the expression host, in the positively charged crevice between the N and C lobes. Cryo-electron microscopy has also determined that whilst Bunyamwera virions are pleomorphic in shape, they display a locally ordered lattice of glycoprotein spikes. Each spike protrudes 18 nanometers from the viral membrane and becomes disordered upon introduction to an acidic environment.

Although the exact icosahedral symmetry of a Batai virus viron is yet to be determined, studies using Cryo-electron tomography on related viruses of the Bunyaviridae family have shown that there exists an icosahedral lattice with clear T=12 quasisymmetry. Consequently, this triangulation number would correlate with a viral nuclear capsid exhibiting 720 faces. This study was performed on the Rift Valley Fever Virus (RVFV), which is an arthropod borne disease that is endemic to regions of Africa and Asia, namely the Rift Valley in Kenya from which its name is derived.

== Viral Classification and Genome ==
Batai virus is a member of the genus Orthobunyavirus and a member of the family Bunyaviridae. Batai virus is part of a diverse group of arthropod-borne viruses. Classified via the Baltimore scheme, Batai virus is a negative-sense, single-stranded RNA virus. The orthobunyavirus genome has a characteristic segmented genome, with small, medium, and large (S, M, and L) segments which generally encode the nucleocapsid, envelope protein and the polymerase protein, respectively. The size of the S segment is 943 nucleotides, the size of the M segment is 4440 nucleotides, and the size of the L segment is 6870 nucleotides. In the S segment there are two open reading frames (ORFs), the nucleocapsid and non-structurals which were overlapping. The M segment has a polyprotein precursor in the open reading frame. The L segment encodes for an RNA-dependent RNA polymerase.

Batai virus is geographically spread throughout Asia and Europe. It has been shown that batai viruses from Japan, Malaysia and India share homologies in the genomic sequence more so than when virus strains from Europe and Asia are compared to each other. Reassortment of the genome can have some serious effects. It has been observed that reassortment between the M segment and the S and L segments with another strain of Batai virus (BUNV) can cause an increase in the virulence of Batai virus. Reassortment of the genome within the genus Orthobunyavirus are not uncommon and can lead to an increase in virulence.

== Replication of Batai Virus ==
It is well known that the geographical distribution of Batai virus (BATV) includes the regions of Europe, Asia and Africa. The most common vertebrate affected by BATV are domestic pigs, horses, ruminants and wild birds, which have been known to be the primary mammalian hosts. The transmission cycle of BATV occurs in agricultural ecosystems via Anopheles, Culex and Ochlerotatus species mosquitoes in a typical vertebrate–mosquito cycle.

While limited research has been conducted on the viral cycle of the Batai virus, comparable studies with the close relative Bunyamwera virus has shown that viral infection begins in the salivary glands of mosquitos. At the onset of replication the virus particles coalesce into vacuole membranes lining the cytoplasm of the infected cells. Entry into the cell is facilitated by the viral enveloped nucleocapsid, which contains glycoproteins G1 and G2. Encoded by the M RNA segment they are involved in attachment to the host cell through unidentified receptors on the surface and elicit neutralizing antibodies. Transcription of BATV is said to be similar to that of influenza in that mRNA synthesis is primed by cap-containing oligonucleotides that are generated by a certain viral-endonuclease, functioning to cleave the host cell mRNA. These resulting primers are then incorporated into the viral mRNA. BATV will also encode for two non-structural proteins, NSm on the M segment and NSs on the S segment. During the process it is believed that NSm actively participates in assembly of the virus. These newly assembled viral particles will mature over a period of time inside of the hosts cell in the membranes of the Golgi apparatus before being released.

However, while able to replicate in both vertebrate and invertebrate species, in mosquito cells no cell death is observed and persistent infection is established. Whereas in mammalian cells infection is typically categorized as lytic and eventually leads to cell death. This stems from the viruses ability to form clear lytic plaques in cells of vertebrate species but not in those derived from insects. It has been demonstrated in previous studies that in mammalian cells, the NSs protein will induce a shut-off of host protein synthesis which will lead to the death of the host cell. It has also been shown to counteract the host cell antiviral response. This would establish it as the main virulence factor as it acts during the transcriptional phase by inhibiting RNA polymerase II–mediated transcription. Meanwhile, the mosquito cells neither host cell transcription nor translation are inhibited by this fact. It would seem the difference in the behavior of the NSs protein could be one of the factors responsible for the different outcomes of infection attributed to the Batai virus in mammalian and mosquito cells. Some have theorized that a release method that does not rupture the cell membrane could explain why viral replication does not kill mosquito cells and persistence is maintained. Similar NSs proteins of the Rift Valley fever phlebovirus have quite a distinct size and amino acid sequence, but they play a similar role in mammalian cells in overcoming the innate immune responses that are a consequence of the global shut-down of the cells transcription mechanisms. Similar NSs proteins of the Rift Valley fever phlebovirus have quite a distinct size and amino acid sequence, but they play a similar role in mammalian cells in overcoming the innate immune responses that are a consequence of the global shut-down of the cells transcription mechanisms.

== Associated Diseases ==
Batai virus (BATV) is a member of the family Bunyaviridae. Associated viruses include Crimean-Congo hemorrhagic fever, Bunyamwera virus, and severe fever with thrombocytopenia syndrome.

Crimean-Congo hemorrhagic fever is one of the viruses that is associated with Batai virus, as it is in the same family Bunyaviridae. This occurs in the same areas throughout the world including Africa, Asia, Europe. It mainly infects farmworkers in these regions of the world, and is a tick-borne illness. Infection results in high fever, chills, severe headache, dizziness, back, and abdominal pains. Other symptoms that have been noted include nausea, vomiting, diarrhea, and cardiovascular and neuropsychiatric changes. If severe symptoms may include hemorrhages in the skin, causing lesions or bruising. It has a 30% fatality rate.

A closely associated disease is the Bunyamwera virus, which is of the same family and genus as the Batai virus (BATV); it is known to cause Bunyamwera fever. This particular virus is spread by mosquitos biting infected mice and then biting humans.

Batai virus (BATV) is also associated with severe fever with thrombocytopenia syndrome (SFTS). This was a recently discovered in China in 2011 and is transmitted either directly to humans through ticks, or to house pets as an intermediate host and then on to humans. Symptoms are characterized by fever, vomiting, diarrhea, thrombocytopenia and leukopenia. SFTS virus has a 6-30% fatality rate.
