= 75V-2621 virus =

Virus classification
- (unranked): Virus
- Realm: Riboviria
- Kingdom: Orthornavirae
- Phylum: Negarnaviricota
- Class: Bunyaviricetes
- Order: Elliovirales
- Family: Peribunyaviridae
- Genus: Orthobunyavirus
- Species: Gamboa virus
- Strain: 75V-2621 virus

Synonyms
- Pueblo Viejo virus

Strain of Gamboa virus in the genus Bunyavirus

The 75V-2621 virus (Pueblo Viejo virus) is a strain of Gamboa virus in the genus Bunyavirus. It was first isolated in the mosquito Aedeomyia squamipennis in Vinces, Ecuador in 1974. Ad. squamipennis appears to be the vector and birds a host, including the chicken Gallus gallus domesticus under experimental conditions. It has only been isolated in the tropical regions of Central and South America. It has not been shown to cause disease in humans, or domestic and wild animals; however, in a 2018 study, antibodies against the Gamboa virus were found in birds (6.2%), humans (1.5%), and other wild animals (2.6%).
