= Tensaw virus =

Virus classification
- (unranked): Virus
- Realm: Riboviria
- Kingdom: Orthornavirae
- Phylum: Negarnaviricota
- Class: Bunyaviricetes
- Order: Elliovirales
- Family: Peribunyaviridae
- Genus: Orthobunyavirus
- Species: Orthobunyavirus tensawense

Synonyms
- Tensaw orthobunyavirus

Species of virus

Tensaw virus is a virus in the genus Orthobunyavirus of the Bunyamwera arbovirus group. It is named for the river bordering the area in south Alabama where the prototype strain was discovered. It is abbreviated TEN, TENV, and TSV in the scientific literature.

== Ecology ==
Tensaw virus has been isolated from mosquitoes in southwest Alabama, southeast Georgia, and central and south Florida. Host mosquitoes include Anopheles crucians, Psorophora ciliata, Psorophora confinnis, Anopheles quadrimaculatus, Aedes atlanticus, Aedes mitchellae, Culex nigripalpus, and Mansonia perturbans.

== Disease ==
The virus produces clinical disease and death in suckling and adult mice but not in hamsters, guinea pigs, or rabbits. Antibodies or virus have been detected in dogs, raccoons, cattle, and humans, but no evidence of infection has been found in sentinel chickens or wild birds.

Serum samples from humans in south Florida have tested positive for neutralizing antibodies to Tensaw virus, but clinical disease from Tensaw virus infection in humans had not been reliably demonstrated as of 2006.

Evidence that Bunyamwera serogroup viruses in North America are associated with congenital defects such as macrocephaly and microcephaly in humans suggests the possibility that Tensaw virus and other bunyaviruses may have teratogenic potential in humans.
