= Anhembi virus =

Virus classification
- (unranked): Virus
- Realm: Riboviria
- Kingdom: Orthornavirae
- Phylum: Negarnaviricota
- Class: Bunyaviricetes
- Order: Elliovirales
- Family: Peribunyaviridae
- Genus: Orthobunyavirus
- Species: Orthobunyavirus anhembiense

Synonyms
- Anhembi orthobunyavirus

Species of virus

Anhembi virus (AMBV) is a species of virus. It was initially considered a strain of Wyeomyia virus, belonging serologically to the Bunyamwera serogroup of bunyaviruses. In 2018 it was made its own species. It was isolated from the rodent - Proechimys iheringi - and a mosquito - Phoniomyia pilicauda - in São Paulo, Brazil.

Until 2001 this virus has not been reported to cause disease in humans.
