= Anhembi (disambiguation) =

Anhembi is a Brazilian municipality in the state of São Paulo. It can also refer to:

- Anhembi Convention Center or Anhembi Parque, a convention center located in the Santana district of São Paulo
- Anhembi Morumbi University, a Brazilian private university located in São Paulo
- Anhembi orthobunyavirus, also known as Anhembi virus, a species of virus
- Anhembi Sambadrome, a large outdoor event venue in São Paulo
- Piabina anhembi, a species of fish

== See also ==
- Anhemitonic scale, a musical scale that does not contain semitones
