= Bwamba virus =

Virus classification
- (unranked): Virus
- Realm: Riboviria
- Kingdom: Orthornavirae
- Phylum: Negarnaviricota
- Class: Bunyaviricetes
- Order: Elliovirales
- Family: Peribunyaviridae
- Genus: Orthobunyavirus
- Species: Orthobunyavirus bwambaense

Member viruses
- Bwamba virus; Pongola virus

Synonyms
- Bwamba orthobunyavirus

Species of virus

Bwamba virus (BWAV) is an RNA virus that belongs to the genus Orthobunyavirus. BWAV is present in large parts of Africa, endemic in Mozambique, Tanzania and Uganda. It is transmitted to humans through mosquito bites and results in a brief benign generalised infection with headache, skin rash, diarrhea and joint pain and lasts 4–5 days. The animal reservoir of the virus includes birds, monkeys and donkeys.

== Virus structure ==
Bwamba virus has a negative sense single stranded RNA (ssRNA) genome, and so is classified as a class V virus under the Baltimore classification system. The genome is segmented into three pieces, Large (L), Medium (M) and Small (S), which have a combined length of approximately 12,000nt. The S RNA encodes a nucleocapsid and non structural proteins, the M RNA encodes envelope glycoproteins and a non structural membrane polypeptide and the L RNA encodes an RNA dependent RNA polymerase. The segmented RNAs are surrounded by nucleocapsid proteins that form a Ribonucleoprotein complex, that associates with RNA dependent RNA polymerase. The complex is surrounded by a lipid layer, into which the nuclear complex interacts. Finally the particle is membrane bound, spherical, and in total is approximately 100 nm in diameter.

== Gene expression and genome replication ==
Once inside a host cell cytoplasm, the genomic RNA’s are transcribed into mRNA’s by the associated RNA polymerase. From these transcripts, the host machinery is used for translation into viral proteins. The S segment is slightly different from the rest as it is ambisense, meaning genes run in both the positive and negative directions. To enable correct translation of the proteins, a second round of transcription has to occur.

To replicate the genome, transcription occurs to produce a replicative intermediate, which is then itself transcribed into new RNA genomes, with the aid of the RNA polymerases produced from the gene expression.

== Geographical distribution ==
In 1937, Bwamba fever was first recognized as a clinical illness among construction workers building a road to Bwamba County, Western Uganda, present day Bundibugyo District. Bwamba fever is present in large parts of Africa and antibodies of the virus have been found ‘as far south as the Republic of South Africa and as far north westwards as Gambia’. Bwamba fever is endemic in several African countries, including Mozambique, Tanzania and Uganda, where the virus was initially discovered. The distribution of the virus tends to be underestimated because the symptoms are relatively mild and are often mistaken for malaria.

== Transmission ==
Bwamba virus is transmitted to humans through mosquito bites. The main anthropophilic vectors are Anopheles gambiae and Anopheles funestus.

The animal reservoir includes birds, monkeys and donkeys, which have been found to possess antibodies to Bwamba virus.

== Human disease ==
Bwamba fever presents itself as a severe, but benign generalised infection of short duration, usually only lasting four to five days. Symptoms include fever, headache, arthralgia, and local as well as generalised pain. No fatalities have been recorded so far. "Exanthem is nearly always present and is frequently associated with meningeal involvement. [...] Intestinal tract involvement, especially diarrhea, is also seen. Some patients may also develop a body rash," as reported by the Uganda Virus Research Institute, who also discovered the disease in the 1940s.

== See also ==
- Bundibugyo virus, an Ebolavirus

== Literature ==
- Lutwama, J. J.; Rwaguma, E. B.; Nawanga, P. L.; Mukuye, A. (2002). "Isolations of Bwamba virus from south central Uganda and north eastern Tanzania". African Health Sciences. 2 (1): 24–28. PMC 2141559. PMID 12789111.
- Bowen, M.D.; Trappier, S.G.; Sanchez, A.J.; Meyer, R.F.; Goldsmith, C.S.; Zaki, S.R.; Dunster, L.M.; Peters, C.J.; Ksiazek, T.G.; et al. (2001). "A reassortant bunyavirus isolated from acute hemorrhagic fever cases in Kenya and Somalia". Virology. 291 (2): 185–190. doi:10.1006/viro.2001.1201. PMID 11878887.
- Schmaljohn C.S. and Hooper, J.W. (2001). Bunyaviridae: The viruses and their replication. In: Fields Virology, 4' Edn, (D.M. Knipe and P. Howley, eds), pp 1581–1602. Lippincott, Williams and Wilkins, Philadelphia.
- Bwamba Virus description,
