= Aedes mcintoshi =

Scientific classification
- Kingdom: Animalia
- Phylum: Arthropoda
- Class: Insecta
- Order: Diptera
- Family: Culicidae
- Genus: Aedes
- Subgenus: Neomelaniconion
- Species: A. mcintoshi

Binomial name
- Aedes mcintoshi (Huang, 1985)

Species of mosquito

Aedes mcintoshi is a species complex of zoophilic mosquito belonging to the genus Aedes.

== Distribution ==
This mosquito species prefers shallow wetland regions known as dambo habitats like those found in Kenya. Its presence has also been recorded in India.

== Description ==
Females deposit their eggs in areas that are likely to flood, with the eggs being able to sustain hatching until they have been submerged for a significant period of time.

== Medical importance ==
Aedes mcintoshi has been described as a primary vector for Rift Valley fever virus. It can transmit this virus to other hosts during the act of blood-feeding, as well as to its own progeny through transovarial transmission. It is also a vector of pathogens such as Plasmodium spp., Bunyamwera virus, Pongola virus, and others.
