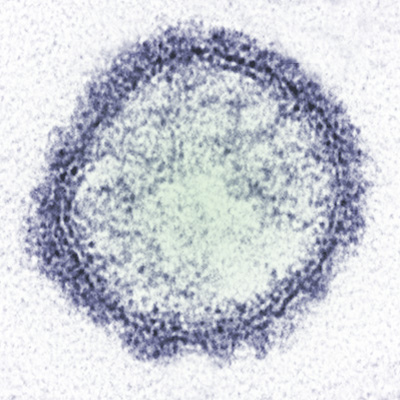
- Schmallenberg virus

Virus classification
- (unranked): Virus
- Realm: Riboviria
- Kingdom: Orthornavirae
- Phylum: Negarnaviricota
- Class: Bunyaviricetes
- Order: Elliovirales
- Family: Peribunyaviridae
- Genus: Orthobunyavirus
- Species: Orthobunyavirus schmallenbergense

Synonyms
- Schmallenberg orthobunyavirus

= Schmallenberg virus =

Species of virus

Schmallenberg virus, abbreviated SBV, is a virus that causes congenital malformations and stillbirths in cattle, sheep, goats, and possibly alpaca. It appears to be transmitted by midges (Culicoides spp.), which are likely to have been most active in causing the infection in the Northern Hemisphere summer and autumn of 2011, with animals subsequently giving birth from late 2011. Schmallenberg virus falls in the Simbu serogroup of orthobunyaviruses. It is considered to be most closely related to the Shamonda, Sathuperi and Douglas viruses.

The virus is named after Schmallenberg, in North Rhine-Westphalia, Germany, from where the first definitive sample was derived. It was first reported in October 2011. After Germany, it has also been detected in the Netherlands, Belgium, France, Luxembourg, Italy, Spain, the United Kingdom, Switzerland, Ireland, Finland, Denmark, Sweden, Austria, Norway, Poland and Estonia.

The virus has been recognised by the European Commission's Standing Committee on the Food Chain and Animal Health and the Friedrich-Loeffler-Institut (German Research Institute for Animal Health). A risk assessment in December 2011 did not consider it likely to be a threat to human health, as other comparable viruses are not zoonotic.

Immunity can possibly be acquired naturally against SBV. It is possible that the seasonality of the infection cycle would not entail a second epidemic circulation next year, due to the shortness of the viraemic period (about 4 to 6 days post exposure, longer in affected foetuses). Vaccination is a possible option for controlling the disease as a vaccine exists for the similar Akabane virus.

== Molecular biology ==
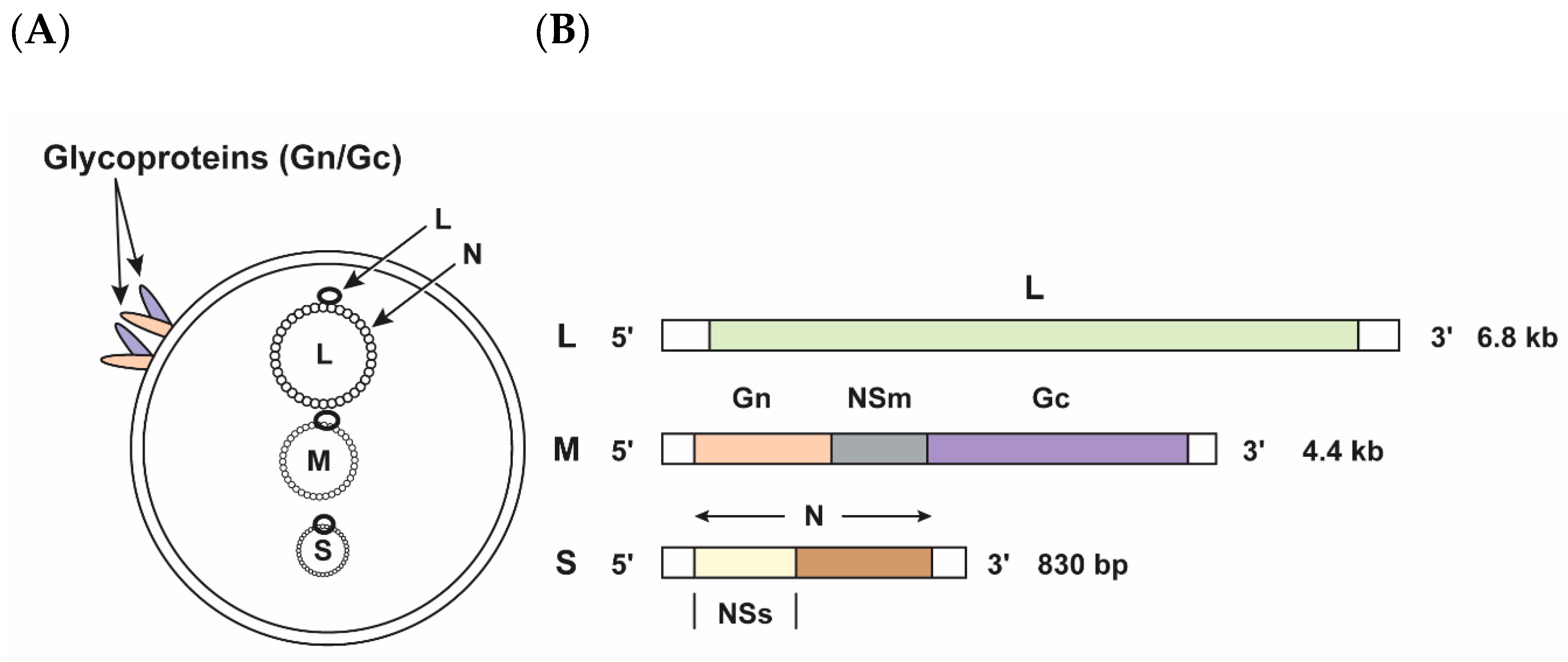
Schmallenberg virus (SBV) virion and genome organization.

The genetic structure of Schmallenberg virus is typical for bunyaviruses, which are a class of enveloped negative-sense single stranded RNA viruses with a genome split into three parts—Small (S), Medium (M) and Large (L). The L RNA segment encodes an RNA-dependent RNA polymerase (L protein), the M RNA segment encodes two surface glycoproteins (Gc and Gn) and a nonstructural protein (NSm), while the S RNA segment encodes a nucleocapsid protein (N) and, in an alternative overlapping reading frame, a second nonstructural protein (NSs). The genomic RNA segments are encapsidated by copies of the N protein in the form of ribonucleoprotein (RNP) complexes. The N protein is the most abundant protein in virus particles and infected cells and, therefore, the main target in many serological and molecular diagnostics.

== Signs of disease ==
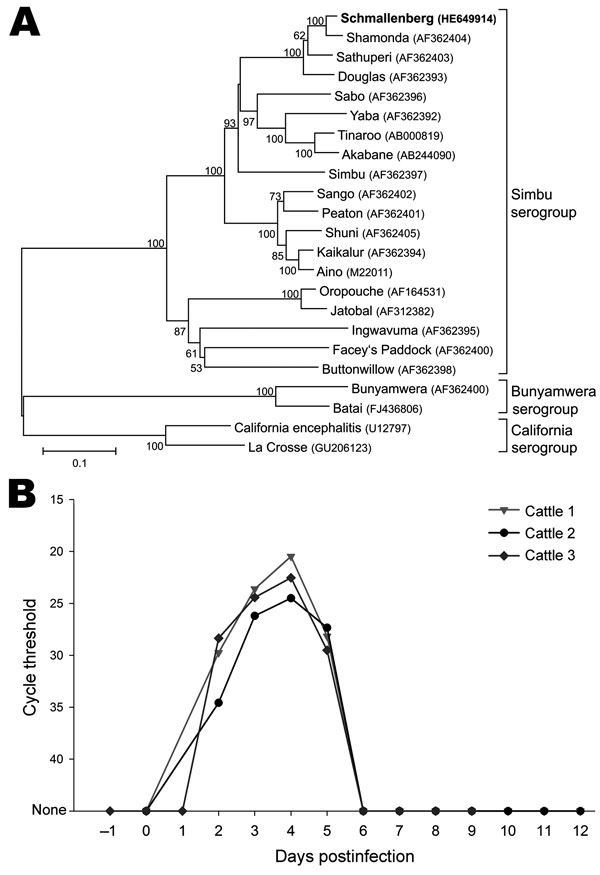
(A) Phylogenetic relationship between Schmallenberg virus and orthobunyaviruses of the Simbu, Bunyamwera, and California serogroups. (B) Detection of Schmallenberg virus genome in the blood of experimentally infected calves.

The virus causes two different profiles of Schmallenberg:

- Fever of short duration, diarrhoea and reduced production of milk in cows

These disease signs have occurred during the period when the disease vectors (mosquitos, sandflies, midges) are active, during the summer and autumn of 2011, mainly affecting cattle.

- Stillbirths and birth defects in sheep, cattle and goats

Congenital malformations in newborn sheep, goats and calves are the most obvious symptoms. In many cases, the dam (female parent) apparently has not presented signs of illness. These cases have occurred from December 2011, especially in sheep. The major malformations observed were: scoliosis, hydrocephalus, arthrogryposis, hypoplasia of the cerebellum and an enlarged thymus.

== Diagnosis ==
Blood samples from live animals with suspicious symptoms are taken for analysis. Dead or aborted foetuses suspected of having the virus are sampled by taking a piece of the brain or spleen for analysis. The samples are tested with the RT-PCR for Schmallenberg virus that has been developed by the Friedrich-Loeffler Institute in Germany. A commercial kit is now available from AdiaVet which targets the L region of the tripartite ssRNA genome of the virus.

== Cases in the United Kingdom ==
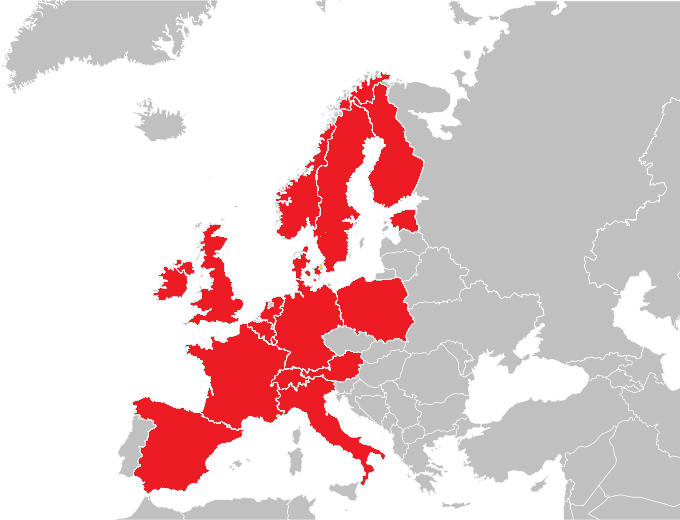
Distribution of Schmallenberg virus by country in Europe

The disease was confirmed as present in the UK on 22 January 2012, on being formally identified in four sheep farms in Norfolk, Suffolk and East Sussex. By 27 February 2012, the disease was reported in other counties in the south of England including the Isle of Wight, Wiltshire, West Berkshire, Gloucestershire, Hampshire and Cornwall. It is likely that it was carried to Eastern England by midges from mainland Europe, a possibility previously identified as a risk by Defra.

== Import bans ==
Russia, Ukraine, Kazakhstan, Egypt and Mexico have all suspended imports of live cattle and sheep, along with embryos and semen from affected countries.

United States banned the import of bovine germplasm collected in EU countries after 1 June 2011.
