= Tahyna virus =

Ťahyňa virus

Virus classification
- (unranked): Virus
- Realm: Riboviria
- Kingdom: Orthornavirae
- Phylum: Negarnaviricota
- Class: Bunyaviricetes
- Order: Elliovirales
- Family: Peribunyaviridae
- Genus: Orthobunyavirus
- Species: Orthobunyavirus tahynaense

Synonyms
- Tahyna orthobunyavirus

Species of virus

Ťahyňa virus ("TAHV") is a viral pathogen of humans classified in the California encephalitis virus (CEV) serogroup of the Orthobunyavirus family in the order Bunyavirales, which is endemic to Europe, Asia, Africa and possibly China.

TAHV is maintained in an enzootic life cycle involving several species of mosquito vectors, with hares, rabbits, hedgehogs, and rodents serving as amplifying hosts.

== History ==
In 1958 a virus transmitted by a mosquito was isolated in the Slovak village of Ťahyňa. The virus was unknown in Europe and was found to belong to the California group and eventually found to occur in most European countries. In human patients, infection with the Tahyna virus appears with influenza-like symptoms. In some cases, meningoencephalitis and atypical pneumonia were observed but no fatal cases have been reported. There are no significant clinical differences between Tahnya and Inkoo viruses.

== Signs and symptoms ==
TAHV causes a non-fatal flu-like illness in humans and is sometimes called Valtice fever. Human TAHV infections generally occur in summer and early fall, with symptoms of fever, headache, malaise, conjunctivitis, pharyngitis, and nausea. The incubation period of the virus lasts about 3 to 7 days. TAHV disease can progress to involve the central nervous system, but fatalities have not been reported. Human infections are common in endemic areas, with neutralizing antibodies present in 60 to 80% of the elderly population.

== Diagnosis ==
The diagnosis of orthobunyaviruses is based on serology, either as a rise in IgG-antibody titers, or the presence of IgM antibodies. RT-PCR methods are under development to detect viral RNA in cerebrospinal fluid samples of patients with encephalitis.

== Genetics ==
Genetic analysis of three complete TAHV genomes has demonstrated a high level of conservation (99%) at the nucleotide and amino acid level, despite the fact that the viruses were collected from temporally distinct regions spanning a 10 to 26 year period. This level of genetic stability is remarkable and suggests a strong environmental pressure to maintain specific genetic compositions.

== Structure ==
These enveloped viruses have a three-segmented negative-strand RNA genome. of approximately 13 kb in total length. The three segments are designated by their size, small (S), medium (M), and large (L) and are complexed with nucleoprotein to form three separate nucleocapsids. The 3' and 5' untranslated regions (UTR) are complementary and highly conserved. The S segment encodes two proteins: the nucleoprotein (N) and a non-structural protein (NS_{s}) which inhibits transcription via inhibiting host cell RNA polymerase II resulting in decreased interferon (INF) induction. The M segment encodes a single polyprotein (M polyprotein) that is post-translationally processed into two surface glycoproteins (G_{N}and G_{C}) which are the targets of neutralizing antibodies, and a nonstructural protein, NS_{M}. The L segment encodes a RNA-dependent RNA polymerase.
