= Debug (disambiguation) =

Debugging (gerund of debug) is the act of finding the cause of and fixing bugs.

Debug may also refer to:

- Debug (command), a command in DOS, OS/2 and Microsoft Windows
- Debug (magazine) or De:Bug, 1997–2014, a German magazine
- Debug (film), a 2014 Canadian science fiction horror film
- Debug Project, an initiative to reduce mosquito population
