= Leishbunyaviridae =

Virus classification
- (unranked): Virus
- Realm: Riboviria
- Kingdom: Orthornavirae
- Phylum: Negarnaviricota
- Class: Bunyaviricetes
- Order: Elliovirales
- Family: Leishbunyaviridae

Family of viruses

Leishbunyaviridae is a family of negative-strand RNA viruses belonging to the Bunyavirales order, which infect protozoans. It only contains one recognized genus Shilevirus. But another genus Leishbunyavirus has also been proposed.
