= SBV =

SBV may refer to:

- Pentavalent antimonial, abbreviated SbV; class of compounds
- Schmallenberg virus, a virus that causes birth defects in sheep, cattle and goats
- State Bank of Victoria
- State Bank of Vietnam
- Super Bowl V
- SBV Vitesse Arnhem, football club
- sbv, ISO-639 abbreviation for the Sabine language
- SBV functions, class of mathematical functions; see Bounded variation#SBV functions
- SBV, the National Rail station code for St Budeaux Victoria Road railway station, Devon, England
