= Cruliviridae =

Virus classification
- (unranked): Virus
- Realm: Riboviria
- Kingdom: Orthornavirae
- Phylum: Negarnaviricota
- Class: Bunyaviricetes
- Order: Elliovirales
- Family: Cruliviridae
- Genus: Lincruvirus

Family of virus

Cruliviridae is a family of virus in the class of Bunyaviricetes. Unlike other families in the class, this family is unique in the sense that it is only used to contain crustacean-infecting bunyaviruses.

== Taxonomy ==
There have been numerous bunya-like viruses proposed to infect crustaceans such as Crab Haemocytic virus, Roscoff virus, and Mourilyan virus. The family Cruliviridae contains one genus, Lincruvirus, which contains the following species:

- Lincruvirus braziliense
- Lincruvirus europense
- Lincruvirus sinense
- Lincruvirus wenlingense
