= Cache Valley virus =

Virus classification
- (unranked): Virus
- Realm: Riboviria
- Kingdom: Orthornavirae
- Phylum: Negarnaviricota
- Class: Bunyaviricetes
- Order: Elliovirales
- Family: Peribunyaviridae
- Genus: Orthobunyavirus
- Species: Orthobunyavirus cacheense

Synonyms
- Cache Valley orthobunyavirus

Species of virus

Cache Valley virus (CVV) is a member of the class Bunyaviricetes, genus Orthobunyavirus, and serogroup Bunyamwera, which was first isolated in 1956 from Culiseta inornata mosquitos collected in Utah's Cache Valley. It has been isolated from mosquitoes and mammals throughout North America, Central America and parts of South America. CVV is an enveloped arbovirus, nominally 80–120 nm in diameter, whose genome is composed of three single-stranded, negative-sense RNA segments. The large segment of related bunyaviruses is approximately 6800 bases in length and encodes a probable viral polymerase. The middle CVV segment has a 4463-nucleotide sequence and the smallest segment encodes for the nucleocapsid, and a second non-structural protein. CVV has been known to cause outbreaks of spontaneous abortion and congenital malformations in ruminants such as sheep and cattle. CVV rarely infects humans, but when they are infected it has caused encephalitis and multiorgan failure.

== Virology ==
=== Genome ===
The Cache Valley virus genome is split into three parts. The three parts are called the small, medium, and large segments, based on the number of bases. The large segment encodes the L protein, which is the RNA dependent RNA polymerase. The small segment utilizes an open reading frame with alternative initiation sites to encode two proteins. Depending on the initiation site, it can either code for the protein that makes up the nucleocapsid, N, or a non-structural protein, NSs. The medium segment encodes 2 type 1 integral transmembrane glycoproteins, Gn and Gc, as well as a non-structural protein Nsm. The Gc and Gn proteins start as one precursor protein and are then cleaved cotranslationally. They are modified by N-linked glycosylation.

=== Replication cycle ===
The attachment, entry, replication, and release of CVV specifically have not been studied. However, there is information of the replication cycle for the genus Orthobunyavirus, which CVV is a part of. A heterodimer of integral transmembrane proteins Gn and Gc form spikes on the surface of the virus particle. They are involved in virus attachment and cell fusion. Once inside the cell, the viral membrane fuses with the endosomal membrane, and the virus genome is released. Transcription involves an RNA dependent RNA polymerase, and it occurs in the cytoplasm of the cell. Transcription of the tripartite genome is terminated by a strong hairpin loop sequence at the end of each segment. Once the virus has replicated enough, it is encapsidated. Assembly and budding of the newly synthesized virions occurs at the membranes of the Golgi apparatus.

=== Host interactions ===
In terms of CVV alone, very little is known about the regulation of host-processes and interactions with host cells. However, CVVs Bunyamwera serogroup's two non-structural proteins play an important role in infection. Bunyamwera virus (BUNV) codes for two non-structural proteins: NSm on the medium RNA segment and NSs on the smallest RNA segment. Bunyamwera virus NSs protein is a nonessential gene that contributes to viral pathogenesis. It has been shown that in mammalian cells, NSs induces shut-off of host protein synthesis, which leads to cell death. It also counteracts the host cell antiviral response and seems to be the main virulence factor, acting at the level of transcription by inhibiting RNA polymerase II–mediated transcription. In mosquito cells neither host cell transcription nor translation are inhibited, and although so far no function for the orthobunyavirus NSs protein has been found in mosquito cells, it seems the differential behavior of NSs could be one of the factors responsible for different outcomes of infection in mammalian and mosquito cell lines.

== Human cases ==
Prior to 1956 there were no known cases of acute infections of Cache Valley virus (CVV) in humans. However antibodies against CVV have been reported. One study found neutralizing antibody to CVV in 12% of 356 persons surveyed in Maryland and Virginia in the 1960s. These results and other such serosurveys are based on nonrandom sampling and therefore often difficult to interpret.

CVV disease is a neuroinvasive illness. Of the three confirmed human cases of CVV disease two resulted in non-fatal meningitis, only the first case caused fatal encephalitis and multiorgan failure.

The first case was a 28-year-old man from North Carolina in 1995. It is likely he was infected with the virus via mosquitos during a deer-hunting trip. The patient's first symptoms were muscle pain, fever, chills and a headache. He began vomiting the day after the first symptoms appeared. Six days after the onset of the illness more severe symptoms appeared including confusion, tachycardia (elevated heart rate), a rash, bilateral conjunctivitis and meningismus. The next day the patient became hypotensive and delirious. Later respiratory failure, seizures and necrosis of the fingers and toes occurred. One leg was amputated because of extensive muscle and cutaneous necrosis. Seven months after the onset of the illness the patient died of pulmonary complications. The causative agent was identified as a virus in the family Bunyaviridae by electron microscopy. This was then identified genetically as CVV. Viremia was recorded seven days after the onset of fever; this is a longer period of viremia than what is normally observed in cases of Bunyaviridae infections.

The second human case of CVV was a 41-year-old man from Wisconsin in October 2003. He developed an acute illness with severe nausea, vomiting, fatigue and headache. He was diagnosed with acute aseptic meningitis. After three days the patient was released from the hospital; he reported feeling fully recovered four months later, though he experienced headaches more frequently than usual. The causative agent was observed with electron microscopy as being virions morphologically similar to bunyaviruses. Nucleotide sequencing identified the virus as CVV.

The third human case of CVV was a 63-year-old woman in New York, in September 2011. When she was admitted to the hospital her symptoms were fever, headache, neck stiffness and photophobia. A week before she had noticed a lesion on her arm, as this began to fade a rash developed and spread. She then developed a fever and symptoms of meningitis. The patient was discharged, but returned the next day with nausea and vomiting. She was diagnosed with aseptic meningitis. She was discharged four days later. Two months after this she reported ongoing difficulties in word finding and headaches. CVV was identified as the causative agent by PCR, sequence analysis confirmed this identification.

It is likely that CVV disease is underreported. Very few human cases have been reported despite its wide geographic distribution and the large number of mosquito species that transmit it. The rarity of CVV disease diagnosis is partly due to the fact that laboratories rarely test for CVV. Therefore, the true incidence of CVV disease and its full clinical range are still unknown. Given the widespread distribution of CVV and other viruses in the same serogroup in the United States it is possible some unexplained cases of severe multiorgan failure, congenital anomalies and human viral encephalitis may be due to CVV or similar viruses. More research of such cases is needed.

== Other animals ==
Cache Valley virus is the most common orthobunyavirus in North America, and while isolated in 1956, was only linked to disease in Texas in 1987 during a large occurrence of aborted and malformed lambs in a sheep flock. The virus does not only infect sheep, however, as In 2002 a survey conducted in 22 states showed 28% of cattle expressed specific antibodies to CVV. Cache Valley virus has also been identified as a cause of fetal abnormalities in goats. Other serological surveys have also shown antibodies to CVV in domestic and wild ruminants, along with horses. Of wild ruminants, deer have a very high seroprevalence. With viraemia lasting 1 to 3 days, they are easily able to spread the virus to vectors including Culicoides midges and Aedes, Anopheles, Coquillettidia and Culiseta group mosquitoes. Therefore, deer tend to act as amplifying hosts to the virus.

=== Symptoms in sheep ===
While the virus is able to replicate in adult animals, besides a slight febrile response in some cases, there are no known symptoms of infection. There is a quick period of viraemia before seroconversion and the infection is cleared quickly by the animal's immune system. However, if the animal is pregnant and not protected by antibodies from a previous infection, Cache Valley virus can be very lethal to a developing fetus.

The symptoms the fetus develops from CVV infection are largely age dependent. At less than 28 days of gestation, the embryo usually dies and is reabsorbed by the mother. Between 28 and 45 days of gestation, infection leads to malformations in the developing fetus and occasionally leads to abortions. Early in this window, between 28 and 36 days, the virus leads to both central nervous system and musculoskeletal defects, while after 36 days of gestation infection only leads to musculoskeletal deformities. Death of the fetus usually occurs between 27 and 35 days gestation, when the central nervous system tissues are most susceptible. After 45–50 days of gestation CVV infection is not expected to cause harmful effects. After 76 days the fetus has a functioning immune system and antibodies to the virus are produced.

Autopsies of infected fetuses show severe lesions in the brain and spinal column, ranging from microscopic in size to whole sections of the brain missing. In one laboratory case, the cerebral hemispheres were nothing more than fluid-filled sacs that were easily ruptured. The most common musculoskeletal deformations include arthrogryposis and greatly reduced muscle mass, with the most severe cases having torticollis, scoliosis, and kyphosis. While most affected lambs are stillborn, those that do survive are usually so weak they die within minutes of birth. During the time that they are alive, these lamb are reported to act abnormal, such as acting weak, drowsy, or walking unsteadily.

=== Pathology ===
When ewes were experimentally infected with Akabane virus, a teratogenic virus of the genus Orthobunyavirus closely related to Cache Valley virus, the virus was shown to replicate in the trophoblastic cells of the placenta. When the virus crossed the placenta and infected the developing fetus, it showed a tropism for the immature fetal cells of the central nervous system and skeletal muscle. Hydranencephaly has also been identified in goat kids with presumptive in utero infection with Cache Valley virus.

== History ==
Cache Valley virus was first isolated from mosquitoes in Utah in 1956. It derives its name from Cache Valley, an agricultural valley located in northern Utah and southeast Idaho. It is endemic to North America, specifically Canada, Mexico, and the United States. The first confirmed human case happened on November 2, 1995. In Texas in 1987, CVV was described as a possible causative agent of disease in sheep. The white-tailed deer population has been identified as a potential natural reservoir.

== Prevention ==
Currently, there is no vaccine or known treatment available for CVV. The most effective method of protecting ruminants from CVV is to minimize their exposure to mosquito-infested areas during and shortly after breeding season. Concerning the safety of humans, it is advised that necessary precautions be taken, such as, putting on mosquito repellent or layers of clothing, when being exposed to mosquito-infested areas.
