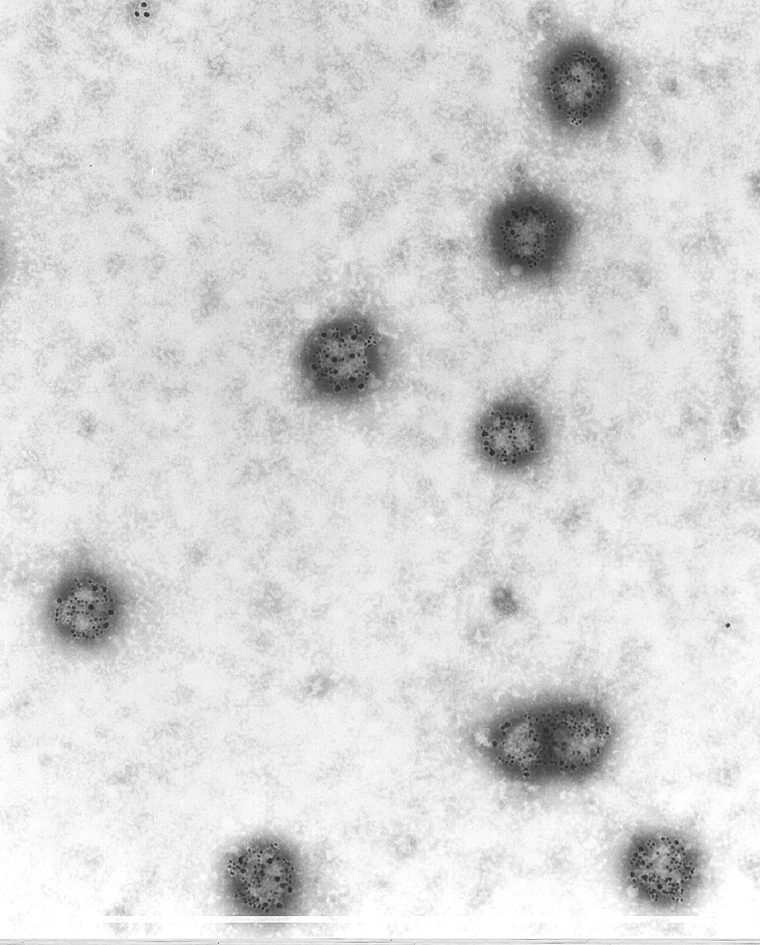
- Transmission electron micrograph of the Akabane virus

Virus classification
- (unranked): Virus
- Realm: Riboviria
- Kingdom: Orthornavirae
- Phylum: Negarnaviricota
- Class: Bunyaviricetes
- Order: Elliovirales
- Family: Peribunyaviridae
- Genus: Orthobunyavirus
- Species: Orthobunyavirus akabaneense

Synonyms
- Akabane orthovirus

= Akabane virus =

Species of virus

Akabane virus is an insect-transmitted virus that causes congenital abnormalities of the central nervous systems in ruminants. The virus is found in Australia, where it is most commonly spread by biting midges of the Culicoides species.

== Disease ==
Malformation of the joints, brain, spine and jaw are common in affected newborn animals. Abortion may also occur if damage to the fetus is severe.

== Diagnosis and treatment ==
Viral isolation can be attempted with immunofluorescence or PCR.

Vaccination is used to control the spread of disease. Control of the insect vectors is advisable if possible, but often difficult to implement.

== Outbreaks ==
A European outbreak of a novel orthobunyavirus began in 2011. The virus was initially isolated near Schmallenberg in Germany, and has been informally named Schmallenberg virus. Schmallenberg virus falls in the Simbu serogroup of orthobunyaviruses, in which the aino and akabane viruses are also grouped. It is considered to be most closely related to the Sathuperi and Douglas viruses.
