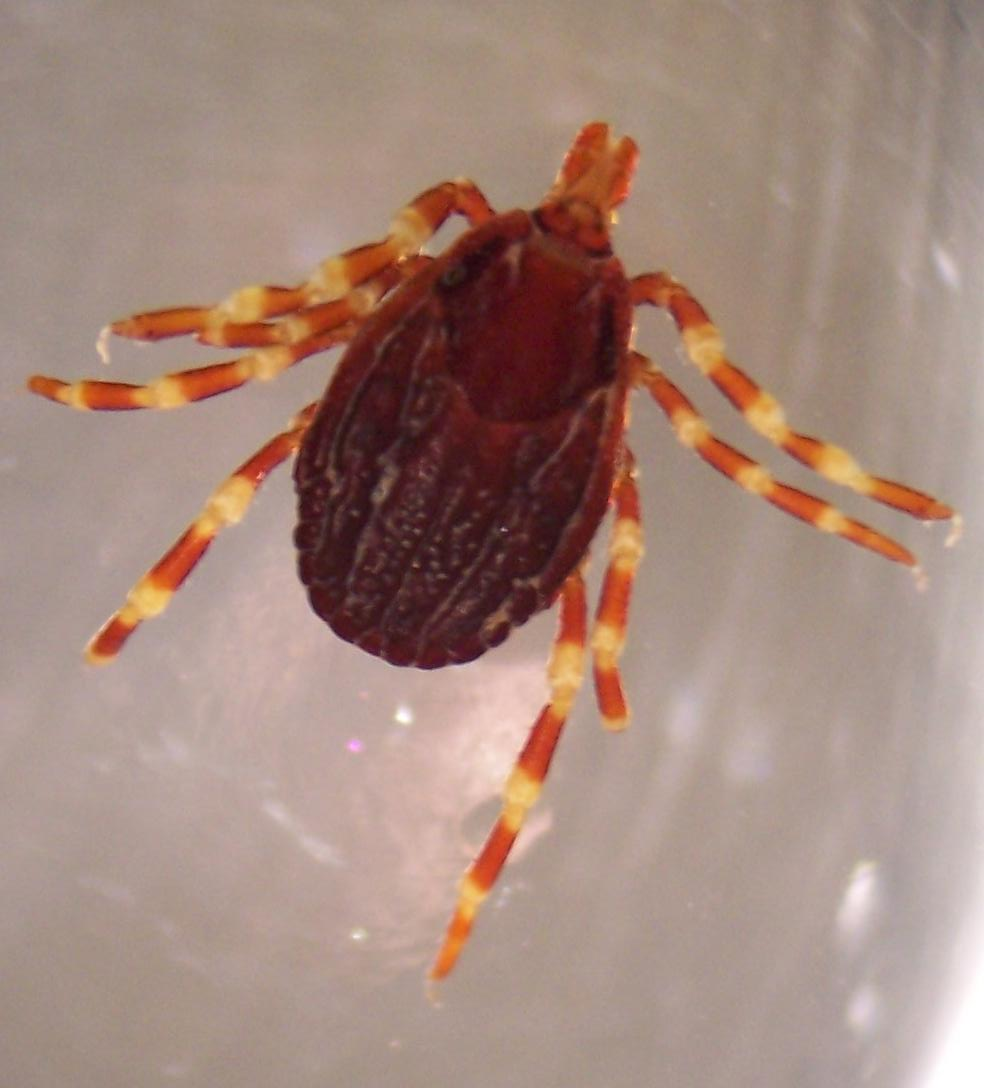
- Specimen in alcohol

Scientific classification
- Domain: Eukaryota
- Kingdom: Animalia
- Phylum: Arthropoda
- Subphylum: Chelicerata
- Class: Arachnida
- Order: Ixodida
- Family: Ixodidae
- Genus: Hyalomma
- Species: H. marginatum

Binomial name
- Hyalomma marginatum Koch, 1844

= Hyalomma marginatum =

Species of tick

Hyalomma marginatum is a hard-bodied tick found on birds including the pale crag martin. This tick has been implicated in the transmission of Bahig virus, a pathogenic arbovirus previously thought to be transmitted only by mosquitoes.

The Crimean-Congo Hemorrhagic Fever virus has also been detected in ticks of this type removed from migratory birds in Morocco.

Hyalomma marginatum marginatum is a subspecies. The subspecies is typically found in northern Africa, southern Europe and some parts of Asia. It was also identified in Germany in 2006. It is found in Norway.
