= Plasmodium lophurae =

Scientific classification
- Domain: Eukaryota
- Clade: Sar
- Clade: Alveolata
- Phylum: Apicomplexa
- Class: Aconoidasida
- Order: Haemospororida
- Family: Plasmodiidae
- Genus: Plasmodium
- Species: P. lophurae

Binomial name
- Plasmodium lophurae Coggeshall, 1938

Species of single-celled organism

Plasmodium lophurae is a parasite of the genus Plasmodium subgenus Giovannolaia.

Like all Plasmodium species, P. lophurae has both vertebrate and insect hosts. The vertebrate hosts for this parasite are birds.

== Description ==
The parasite was first described by Coggeshall in 1938 after being isolated from chickens. Adult chickens demonstrate resistance to this parasite.

== Distribution ==
P. lophurae was discovered in Sri Lanka and is endemic to the Southeast Asia region.

== Description ==
P. lophurae can be isolated from a blood smear.
