= Debug Project =

Mosquito population reduction program

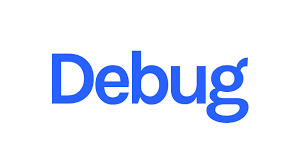
- Key people: Linus Upson
- Website: https://debug.com/

Debug Project is a company under Alphabet Inc., formerly under its subsidiary Verily, using sterile insect technique to reduce the numbers of mosquitoes in a given area through interruption of the reproductive cycle. Through laboratory methods naturally occurring bacteria Wolbachia infect healthy male mosquitoes of the species Aedes aegypti. Subsequently these mosquitoes are released into the wild with the intent to mate with female mosquitoes and by virtue of the Wolbachia infection lay non-producing eggs. It is believed that through this process the overall population of mosquitoes will be reduced by interrupting the reproductive cycle. The hope is that if successful, these might be released in more endemic areas of the world where mosquitoes pose a health risk through the diseases they carry. Computer vision is used to select the males for release.

== History ==
In 2017, 1 million mosquitoes were released per week 20 times in two of Fresno County's neighborhoods. The project was run in the summers of 2017 to 2019 in Fresno. Mosquito populations bounced back afterwards.

As of December 2024, Google had acquired Debug Project from Verily.

As of May 2026, months of releases had decreased dengue incidents in Singapore by "more than 70%."
