= Bunyamwera =

- Location in Uganda
- Coordinates: 0.59584°N 29.99841°E
- Country: Uganda
- Region: Western Uganda
- Subregion: Rwenzururu
- District: Bundibugyo District
- County: Bughendera
- Subcounty: Sindila
- Parish: Bunyamwera
- Elevation: 4,216 ft (1,285 m)

Population (2002)
  - Total: 3,740
  - Estimate (2008): 5,022

Bunyamwera is a town in Bundibugyo District, Uganda. It lies just outside of Rwenzori Mountains National Park, which is to the south. The town is north of Kagugu, southeast of Bunyana, and southwest of Butama. Other nearby settlements include Bundimbuga, 1½ km north, and Bundikahondo, 2 km northwest. The peak of Busunga is 6 km northwest, Kyabwageya's peak is 10 km east, and Kinera's peak is 10 km east. The nearest hospital, Kasulenge Health Center II, is 9 km northeast.

In the 1950s, Bunyamwera was considered a Konzo spur village, and children there went to primary school in the parish of Mutunda.

Bunyamwera parish includes two hydropower plants, Ndugutu and Sindila.

Bunyamwera is where Bunyamwera orthobunyavirus was first isolated, and it also lends its name to that virus' genus Orthobunyavirus, its family Peribunyaviridae, and its order Bunyavirales.
