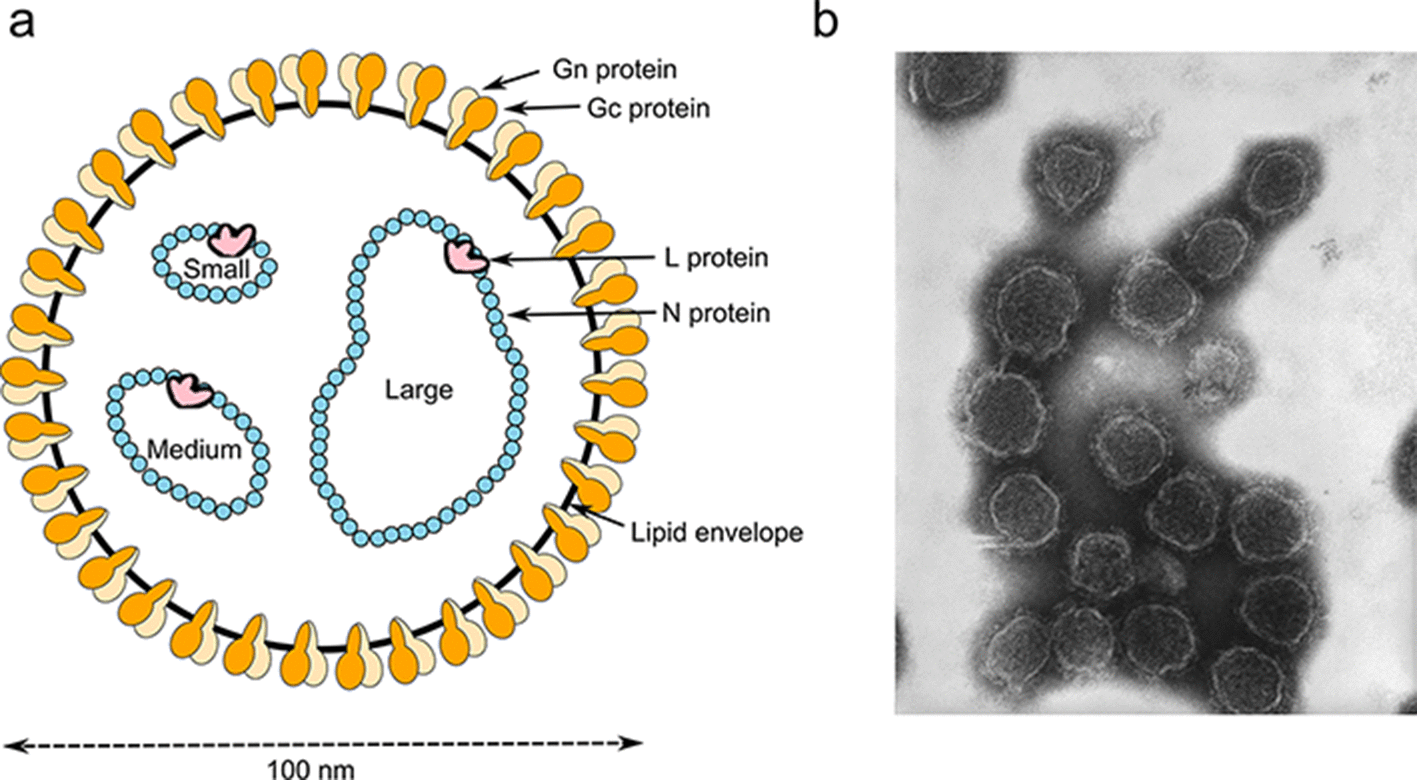
- Orthobunyavirus structure (left); transmission electron micrograph of California encephalitis virus (right)

Virus classification
- (unranked): Virus
- Realm: Riboviria
- Kingdom: Orthornavirae
- Phylum: Negarnaviricota
- Class: Bunyaviricetes
- Order: Elliovirales
- Family: Peribunyaviridae
- Genus: Orthobunyavirus

Species
- See text

= Orthobunyavirus =

Genus of viruses

Orthobunyavirus is a genus of the Peribunyaviridae family in the order Elliovirales. The genus contains 138 species.

The name Orthobunyavirus derives from Bunyamwera, Uganda, where Bunyamwera virus was first discovered, along with the prefix orthos (ορθοϛ) meaning 'straight.'

== Virology ==
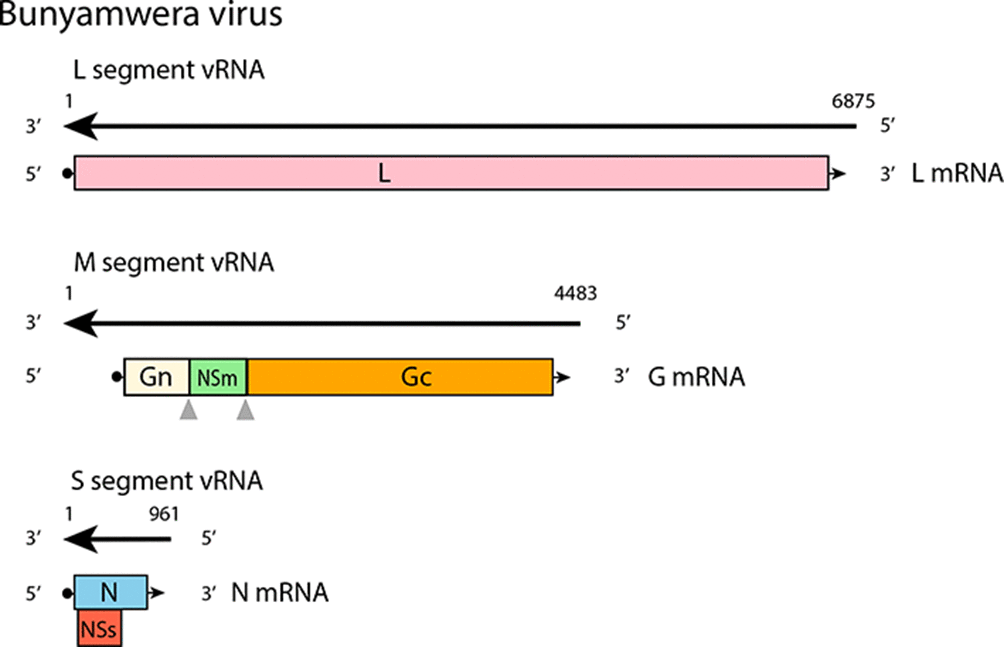
Genome of Bunyamwera virus of the genus Orthosbunyavirus

- The virus is spherical, diameter 80 nm to 120 nm, and comprises three negative-sense single stranded RNA molecules encapsulated in a ribonucleocapsid.
- The three RNAs are described as S, M and L (for Small, Medium and Large) and are circa 1kb (kilobases), 4.5kb and 6.9kb in length
- The S RNA encodes the nucleocapsid protein (N protein) and a non-structural protein (NS protein).
- The M RNA encodes a polyprotein which is cleaved by host protease into Gn, NSm and Gc proteins.
- The L RNA encodes the viral RNA-dependent RNA polymerase or L protein

== Life cycle ==
=== Vectors ===
The primary vectors of orthobunyaviruses are hematophagous insects of the Culicidae family, including members from a number of mosquito genera (including Aedes, Coquillettidia, Culex, Culiseta, and Anopheles) and biting midges (such as Culicoides paraensis). Although transmission by ticks and bed bugs may also occur. Viral vector preference is generally strict, with only a one or very small number of vectors transmitting a specific virus in the region, even where multiple viruses and vectors overlap. Organisms related to the preferential vector may be able to carry a virus but not competently transmit it.

The vector arthropod acquires the virus while taking a blood meal from an infected host. In mosquitoes, replication of orthobunyaviruses is enhanced by immune modulation that occurs as a result of blood protein digestion producing GABA and the activation of GABAergic signalling. Infection is transmitted to a new host via viral particles in vector saliva. Orthobunyavirus infection in arthropod cells is not fully understood, but is generally non-cytopathological and deleterious effects are minimal. Infected mosquitoes may experience an increase in fitness. Transorvarial transmission has been observed among mosquitoes infected with orthobunyaviruses of the California serogroup Like mosquitoes, only female culicoid midges feed on blood; they prefer indoor feeding particularly during rain.

=== Sylvatic cycle hosts ===
In the sylvatic cycle, viruses are transmitted between mammalian hosts by the arthropod vector. A diverse range of mammals have been identified or implicated as hosts or reservoirs of orthobunyaviruses including: non-human primates, sloths, wild and domestic birds, marmosets, rodents, and large mammals such as deer, moose, and elk.

=== Infection ===
Infection begins with the bite of an infected competent vector organism. Viral entry proceeds by receptor-mediated (clathrin-dependent) endocytosis, but which receptors unknown. Although, Heparan sulfate and DC-SIGN (CD209 or dendritic cell–specific intracellular adhesion molecule-3-grabbing non-integrin) have been identified as viral entry components in some orthobunyaviruses. Gn/Gc heterodimers on the viral surface are responsible for target cell recognition, with Gc is considered the primary attachment protein, although Gn has been suggested as the attachment protein for LACV in arthropod cells. Acidification of the endosome triggers a conformational change in the Gc fusion peptide, uncoating the ribonuclearprotein (RNP) as it is released into the cytoplasm.

Upon release into the cytoplasm, primary transcription begins with an endonuclease domain on L protein engaging in a process known as "cap-snatching". During cap-snatching, 10-18 nucleotides of 5' 7-methylguanylate primers are cleaved from host mRNAs and attached to prime the 5' end of the viral RNAs. Like all negative-sense RNA viruses, orthobunyaviruses require ongoing, concurrent translation by the host cell to produce full-length viral mRNAs, consequently the 3' end of orthobunyavirus mRNAs lack polyadenylation. Notably they are also missing the signal for polyadenylation; instead the 3' ends are thought to form a stem-loop structure. Antigenomes (full length positive-sense RNAs) used as templates for replication of the viral genome are produced by L protein RdRp without the need for primers. Both negative-sense genomes and positive-sense antigenomes are associated with N proteins (forming RNPs) at all times during the replication cycle. Thus, N and L are the minimum proteins required for transcription and replication

The M genome segment codes for the Gn-NSm-Gc polyprotein on a single open-reading frame (ORF) which is cotranslationally cleaved by internal signal peptides and host signal peptidase. The free glycoproteins Gc and Gn insert into the membrane of the endoplasmic reticulum and form heterodimers. A Golgi retention signal on Gn, permits transport of the heterodimers to the Golgi apparatus, where glycosylation occurs. The presence of the viral glycoproteins modifies the Golgi membrane to enable budding of RNPs into a Golgi derived tubular viral factory (viroplasm). As segmented viruses, orthobuynaviruses require precise packaging of one of each of the three genomic segments into the final virion to produce a mature, infectious particle. Packaging appears to be directed by signals contained entirely within UTR sequences. The packaged genomes acquire a lipid membrane as they bud into the viral factories, are then transported to the host cell plasma membrane and released via exocytosis. A final gylcoprotein modification upon release produces a mature, infectious particle.

== Evolution ==
Orthobunyaviruses evolve partly by a key mechanism known as genomic reassortment, which also occurs in other segmented viruses. When viruses of the same group co-infect a host cell, mixtures and novel combinations of the S, M, and L segments can be produced, increasing diversity. The most common reassortment events are with the L and S segments.

== Species ==
The genus contains the following species, listed by scientific name and followed by the exemplar virus of the species:

- Orthobunyavirus abrasense, Abras virus
- Orthobunyavirus acaraense, Acará virus
- Orthobunyavirus achiotei, Trivittatus virus
- Orthobunyavirus ainoense, Aino virus
- Orthobunyavirus akabaneense, Akabane virus
- Orthobunyavirus anadyrense, Anadyr virus
- Orthobunyavirus ananindeuaense, Ananindeua virus
- Orthobunyavirus angeloense, San Angelo virus
- Orthobunyavirus anhembiense, Anhembi virus
- Orthobunyavirus apeuense, Apeú virus
- Orthobunyavirus baakalense, Baakal virus
- Orthobunyavirus bakauense, Bakau virus
- Orthobunyavirus balagoduense, Balagodu virus
- Orthobunyavirus barritaense, Barrita virus
- Orthobunyavirus bataiense, Batai virus
- Orthobunyavirus batamaense, Batama virus
- Orthobunyavirus belemense, Belém virus
- Orthobunyavirus bellavistaense, Bellavista virus
- Orthobunyavirus belmontense, Belmont virus
- Orthobunyavirus benficaense, Benfica virus
- Orthobunyavirus bertiogaense, Bertioga virus
- Orthobunyavirus biraoense, Birao virus
- Orthobunyavirus bobayaense, Bobaya virus
- Orthobunyavirus boraceiaense Boracéia virus
- Orthobunyavirus botambiense, Botambi virus
- Orthobunyavirus bozoense, Bozo virus
- Orthobunyavirus brazoriaense, Brazoran virus
- Orthobunyavirus bruconhaense, Bruconha virus
- Orthobunyavirus buffaloense, Buffalo Creek virus
- Orthobunyavirus bunyamweraense, Bunyamwera virus
- Orthobunyavirus bushbushense, Bushbush virus
- Orthobunyavirus buttonwillowense, Buttonwillow virus
- Orthobunyavirus bwambaense, Bwamba virus
- Orthobunyavirus cacheense, Cache Valley virus
- Orthobunyavirus capimense, Capim virus
- Orthobunyavirus caraparuense, Caraparú virus
- Orthobunyavirus catqueense, Cát Quế virus
- Orthobunyavirus catuense, Catú virus
- Orthobunyavirus cuchillaense, Anopheles B virus
- Orthobunyavirus ebiense, Ebinur Lake virus
- Orthobunyavirus encephalitidis, California encephalitis virus
- Orthobunyavirus enseadaense, Enseada virus
- Orthobunyavirus faceyense, Facey's paddock virus
- Orthobunyavirus gamboaense, Gamboa virus
- Orthobunyavirus ganganense, Gan Gan virus
- Orthobunyavirus guajaraense, Guajará virus
- Orthobunyavirus guamaense, Guamá virus
- Orthobunyavirus guaratubaense, Guaratuba virus
- Orthobunyavirus guaroaense, Guaroa virus
- Orthobunyavirus gumbolimboense, Gumbo Limbo virus
- Orthobunyavirus heptayabaense, Yaba-7 virus
- Orthobunyavirus horizonteense, Anopheles A virus
- Orthobunyavirus iacoense, Iaco virus
- Orthobunyavirus ileshaense, Ilesha virus
- Orthobunyavirus indianense, I612045 virus
- Orthobunyavirus infirmati, Infirmatus virus
- Orthobunyavirus ingwavumaense, Ingwavuma virus
- Orthobunyavirus insulae, Kairi virus
- Orthobunyavirus jamestownense, Jamestown Canyon virus
- Orthobunyavirus jatobalense, Jatobal virus
- Orthobunyavirus juandiazense, Juan Díaz virus
- Orthobunyavirus kaengkhoiense, Kaeng Khoi virus
- Orthobunyavirus kernense, Main Drain virus
- Orthobunyavirus ketapangense, Ketapang virus
- Orthobunyavirus keystoneense, Keystone virus
- Orthobunyavirus khatangaense, Snowshoe hare virus
- Orthobunyavirus koongoli, Koongol virus
- Orthobunyavirus kowanyamaense, Kowanyama virus
- Orthobunyavirus lacrosseense, La Crosse virus
- Orthobunyavirus lasmaloyasense, Las Maloyas virus
- Orthobunyavirus leanyerense, Leanyer virus
- Orthobunyavirus ledniceense, Lednice virus
- Orthobunyavirus lichuanense, Lichuan virus
- Orthobunyavirus lukuniense, Lukuni virus
- Orthobunyavirus lumboense, Lumbo virus
- Orthobunyavirus macauaense, Macauã virus
- Orthobunyavirus madridense, Madrid virus
- Orthobunyavirus maguariense, Maguari virus
- Orthobunyavirus mahoganyense, Mahogany Hammock virus
- Orthobunyavirus manzanillaense, Manzanilla virus
- Orthobunyavirus maprikense, Maprik virus
- Orthobunyavirus maritubaense, Marituba virus
- Orthobunyavirus matruhense, Matruh virus
- Orthobunyavirus melajoense, Melao virus
- Orthobunyavirus mermetense, Mermet virus
- Orthobunyavirus minatitlanense, Minatitlán virus
- Orthobunyavirus mirimense, Mirim virus
- Orthobunyavirus mitchellense, Mapputta virus
- Orthobunyavirus mpokoense, M'Poko virus
- Orthobunyavirus navioense, Serra do Navio virus
- Orthobunyavirus nepuyoi, Nepuyo virus
- Orthobunyavirus nesszionaense, Ness Ziona virus
- Orthobunyavirus nolaense, Nola virus
- Orthobunyavirus northwayense, Northway virus
- Orthobunyavirus nyandoense, Nyando virus
- Orthobunyavirus okolaense, Okola virus
- Orthobunyavirus olifantsvleiense, Olifantsvlei virus
- Orthobunyavirus oribocaense, Oriboca virus
- Orthobunyavirus oropoucheense, Oropouche virus
- Orthobunyavirus oyoense, Oyo virus
- Orthobunyavirus pacoraense, Pacora virus
- Orthobunyavirus parkeri, Parker's Farm virus
- Orthobunyavirus patoisense, Patois virus
- Orthobunyavirus peachesterense, Peaton virus
- Orthobunyavirus porteiraense, Cachoeira Porteira virus
- Orthobunyavirus potosiense, Potosi virus
- Orthobunyavirus saboense, Sabo virus
- Orthobunyavirus sangoense, Sango virus
- Orthobunyavirus sanjuanense, San Juan virus
- Orthobunyavirus schmallenbergense, Schmallenberg virus
- Orthobunyavirus sedlecense, Sedlec virus
- Orthobunyavirus shermanense, Fort Sherman virus
- Orthobunyavirus shokweense, Shokwe virus
- Orthobunyavirus shuniense, Shuni virus
- Orthobunyavirus simbuense, Simbu virus
- Orthobunyavirus sororocaense, Sororoca virus
- Orthobunyavirus squalofluvii, Shark River virus
- Orthobunyavirus sussexense, Little Sussex virus
- Orthobunyavirus tacaiumaense, Tacaiuma virus
- Orthobunyavirus tahynaense, Ťahyňa virus
- Orthobunyavirus taiense, Tai orthobunyavirus
- Orthobunyavirus tangaense, Tanga virus
- Orthobunyavirus taniyamense, Taniyama virus
- Orthobunyavirus tataguineense, Tataguine virus
- Orthobunyavirus telokense, Telok Forest virus
- Orthobunyavirus tensawense, Tensaw virus
- Orthobunyavirus termeilense, Termeil virus
- Orthobunyavirus teteense, Tete virus
- Orthobunyavirus thimiriense, Thimiri virus
- Orthobunyavirus timboteuaense, Timboteua virus
- Orthobunyavirus trinitiense, Triniti virus
- Orthobunyavirus turlockense, Turlock virus
- Orthobunyavirus umbreense, Umbre virus
- Orthobunyavirus utingaense, Utinga virus
- Orthobunyavirus witwatersrandense, Witwatersrand virus
- Orthobunyavirus wolkbergense, Wolkberg virus
- Orthobunyavirus wyeomyiae, Wyeomyia virus
- Orthobunyavirus yacaabaense, Yacaaba virus

== See also ==
- 63U-11 virus
- 75V-2621 virus
- Alajuela virus
