= Bunyamwera virus =

Virus classification
- (unranked): Virus
- Realm: Riboviria
- Kingdom: Orthornavirae
- Phylum: Negarnaviricota
- Class: Bunyaviricetes
- Order: Elliovirales
- Family: Peribunyaviridae
- Genus: Orthobunyavirus
- Species: Orthobunyavirus bunyamweraense

Synonyms
- Bunyamwera orthobunyavirus

Species of virus

Bunyamwera virus (BUNV) is a negative-sense, segmented, enveloped RNA virus. It is assigned to the Orthobunyavirus genus, in the Peribunyaviridae family.

Bunyamwera virus can infect both humans and Aedes aegypti (yellow fever mosquito).

It is named for Bunyamwera, a town in western Uganda, where it was isolated in 1943. Reassortant viruses derived from Bunyamwera virus, such as Ngari virus, have been associated with large outbreaks of viral haemorrhagic fever in Kenya and Somalia.

== Molecular biology ==
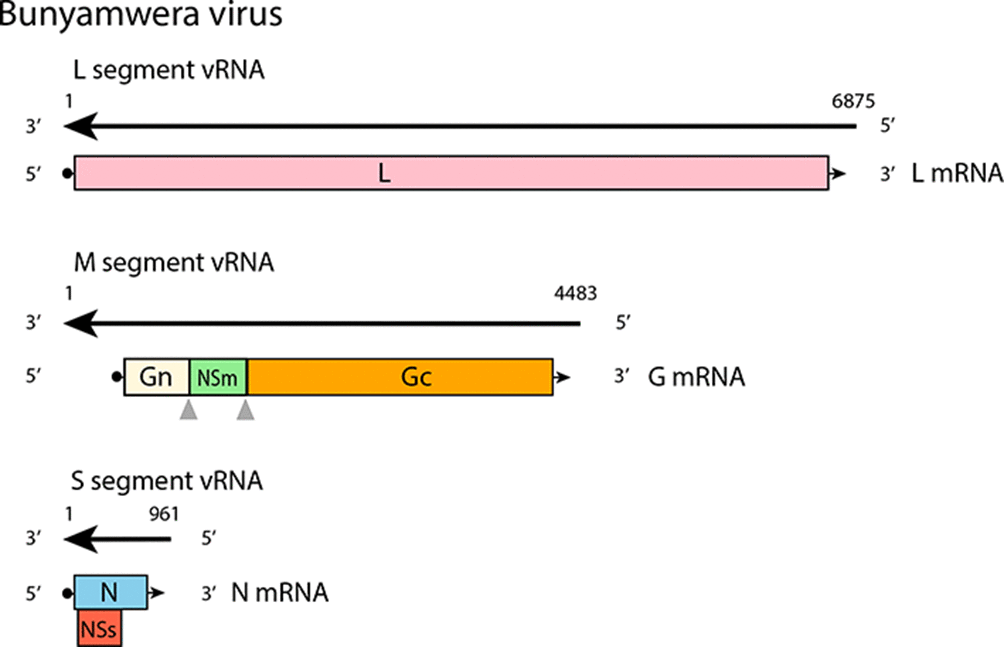
Genome of Bunyamwera virus

The genetic structure of Bunyamwera virus is typical for viruses in Bunyaviricetes, which are a class of enveloped negative-sense, single-stranded RNA viruses with a genome split into three parts—Small (S), Middle (M), and Large (L). The L RNA segment encodes an RNA-dependent RNA polymerase (L protein), the M RNA segment encodes two surface glycoproteins (Gc and Gn) and a nonstructural protein (NSm), while the S RNA segment encodes a nucleocapsid protein (N) and, in an alternative overlapping reading frame, a second nonstructural protein (NSs). The genomic RNA segments are encapsidated by copies of the N protein in the form of ribonucleoprotein (RNP) complexes. The N protein is the most abundant protein in virus particles and infected cells and, therefore, the main target in many serological and molecular diagnostics.

== See also ==
- Lokern virus
