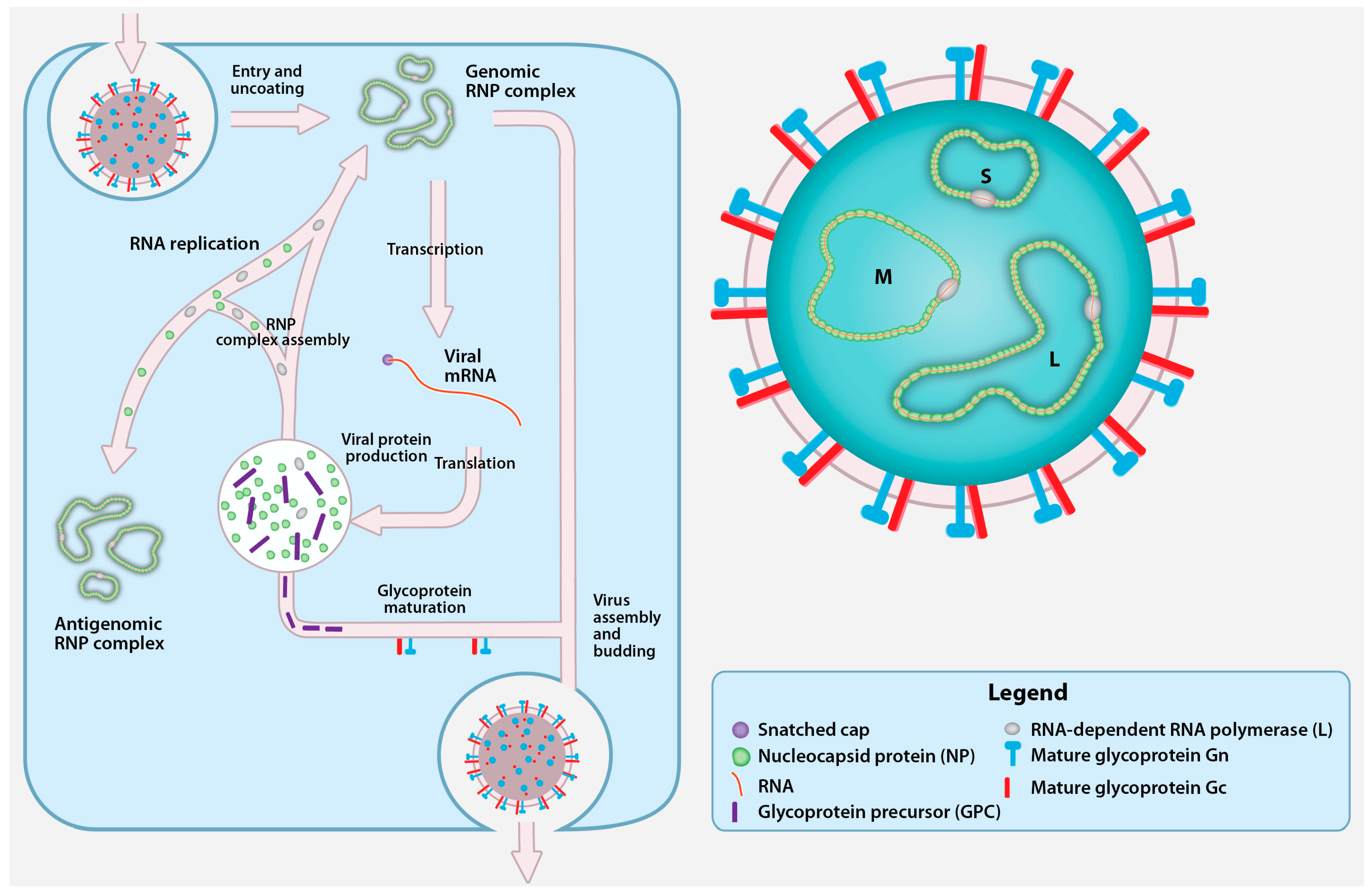
- Crimean-Congo hemorrhagic fever virus (CCHFV) virion and replication cycle

Virus classification
- (unranked): Virus
- Realm: Riboviria
- Kingdom: Orthornavirae
- Phylum: Negarnaviricota
- Subphylum: Polyploviricotina
- Class: Bunyaviricetes

Subtaxa
- See text

= Bunyaviricetes =

Class of RNA viruses

Bunyaviricetes is a class of segmented negative-strand RNA viruses with mainly tripartite genomes. Member viruses infect arthropods, plants, protozoans, and vertebrates. The name Bunyaviricetes derives from Bunyamwera, where the virus Bunyamwera virus was first discovered.

Bunyaviruses belong to the fifth group of the Baltimore classification system, which includes viruses with a negative-sense, single-stranded RNA genome. They have an enveloped, spherical virion. Though generally found in arthropods or rodents, certain viruses in this class occasionally infect humans. Some of them also infect plants. In addition, there is a group of bunyaviruses whose replication is restricted to arthropods and is known as insect-specific bunyaviruses.

A majority of bunyaviruses are vector-borne. With the exception of Hantaviruses and Arenaviruses, all viruses in the Bunyaviricetes class are transmitted by arthropods (mosquitos, tick, or sandfly). Hantaviruses are transmitted through contact with rodent feces. Incidence of infection is closely linked to vector activity, for example, mosquito-borne viruses are more common in the summer.

Human infections with certain members of Bunyaviricetes, such as Crimean–Congo hemorrhagic fever virus, are associated with high levels of morbidity and mortality, consequently handling of these viruses is done in biosafety level 4 laboratories. They are also the cause of severe fever with thrombocytopenia syndrome.

Hantaviruses are another medically important member of the class Bunyaviricetes. They are found worldwide, and are relatively common in Korea, Scandinavia (including Finland), Russia, western North America and parts of South America. Hantavirus infections are associated with high fever, lung edema, and pulmonary failure. The mortality rate varies significantly depending on the form, being up to 50% in New World hantaviruses (the Americas), up to 15% in Old World hantaviruses (Asia and Europe), and as little as 0.1% in Puumala virus (mostly Scandinavia). The antibody reaction plays an important role in decreasing levels of viremia.

== Virology ==
=== Structure ===
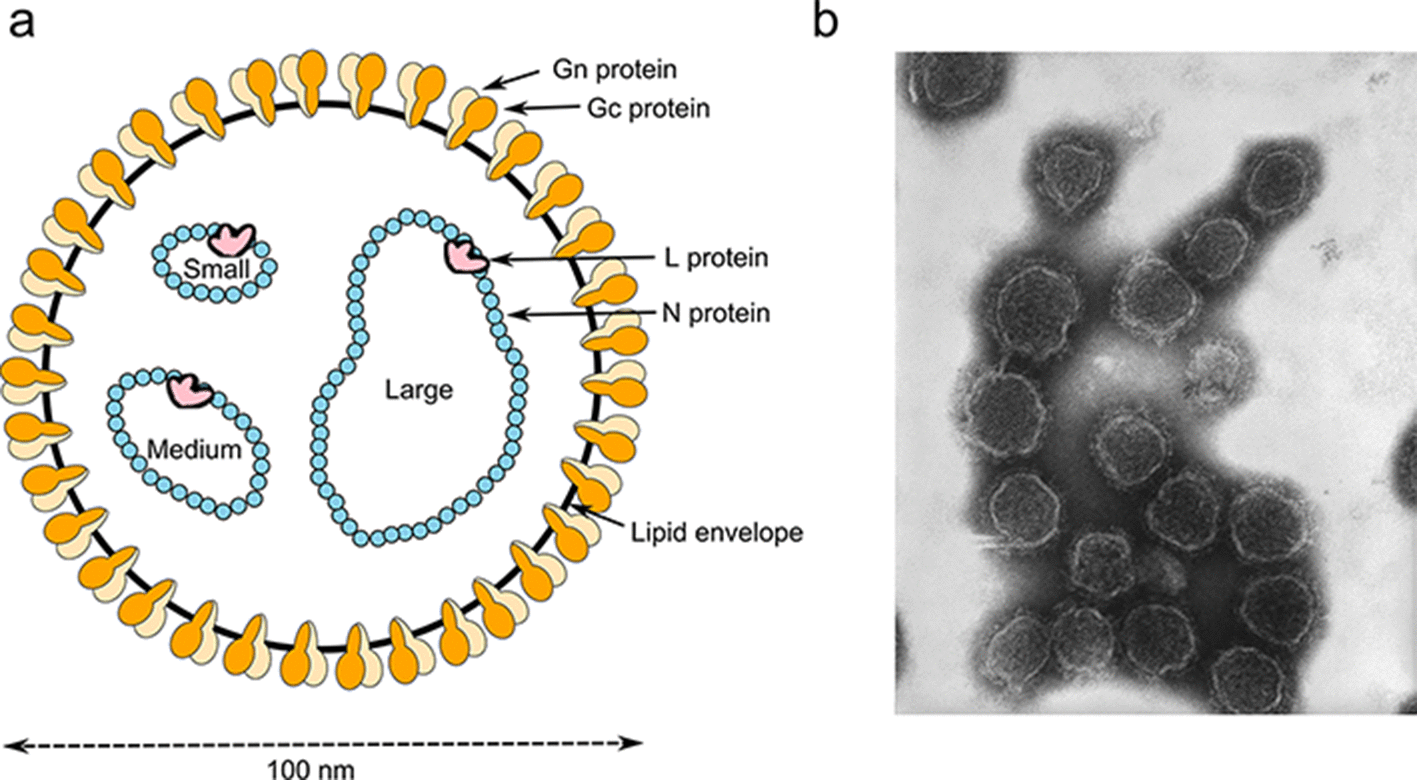
Peribunyavirus virion structure

Bunyavirus morphology is somewhat similar to that of the Paramyxoviridae family; bunyaviruses form enveloped, spherical virions with diameters of 80–120 nm. With the exception of Arenaviruses, these viruses contain no matrix proteins. Instead, the viral surface glycoproteins that form a continuous layer on the virion surface are thought to play a role in protection of genetic information.

=== Genome ===
Bunyaviruses have bi- or tripartite genomes consisting of a large (L) and small (s), or large (L), medium (M), and small (S) RNA segment. These RNA segments are single-stranded, and exist in a helical formation within the virion. Besides, they exhibit a pseudo-circular structure due to each segment's complementary ends. The L segment encodes the RNA-dependent RNA polymerase, necessary for viral RNA replication and mRNA synthesis. The M segment encodes the viral glycoproteins, which project from the viral surface and aid the virus in attaching to and entering the host cell. The S segment encodes the nucleocapsid protein (N).

Most bunyaviruses have a negative-sense L and M segment. The S segment of the genus Phlebovirus, and both M and S segment of the genus Tospovirus are ambisense. Ambisense means that some of the genes on the RNA strand are negative sense and others are positive sense. The ambisense S segment codes for the viral nucleoprotein (N) in the negative sense and a nonstructural protein (NSs) in the positive sense. The ambisense M segment codes for glycoprotein (GP) in the negative sense and a nonstructural protein (NSm) in the positive sense.

The total genome size ranges from 10.5 to 22.7 kbp.

=== Life cycle ===
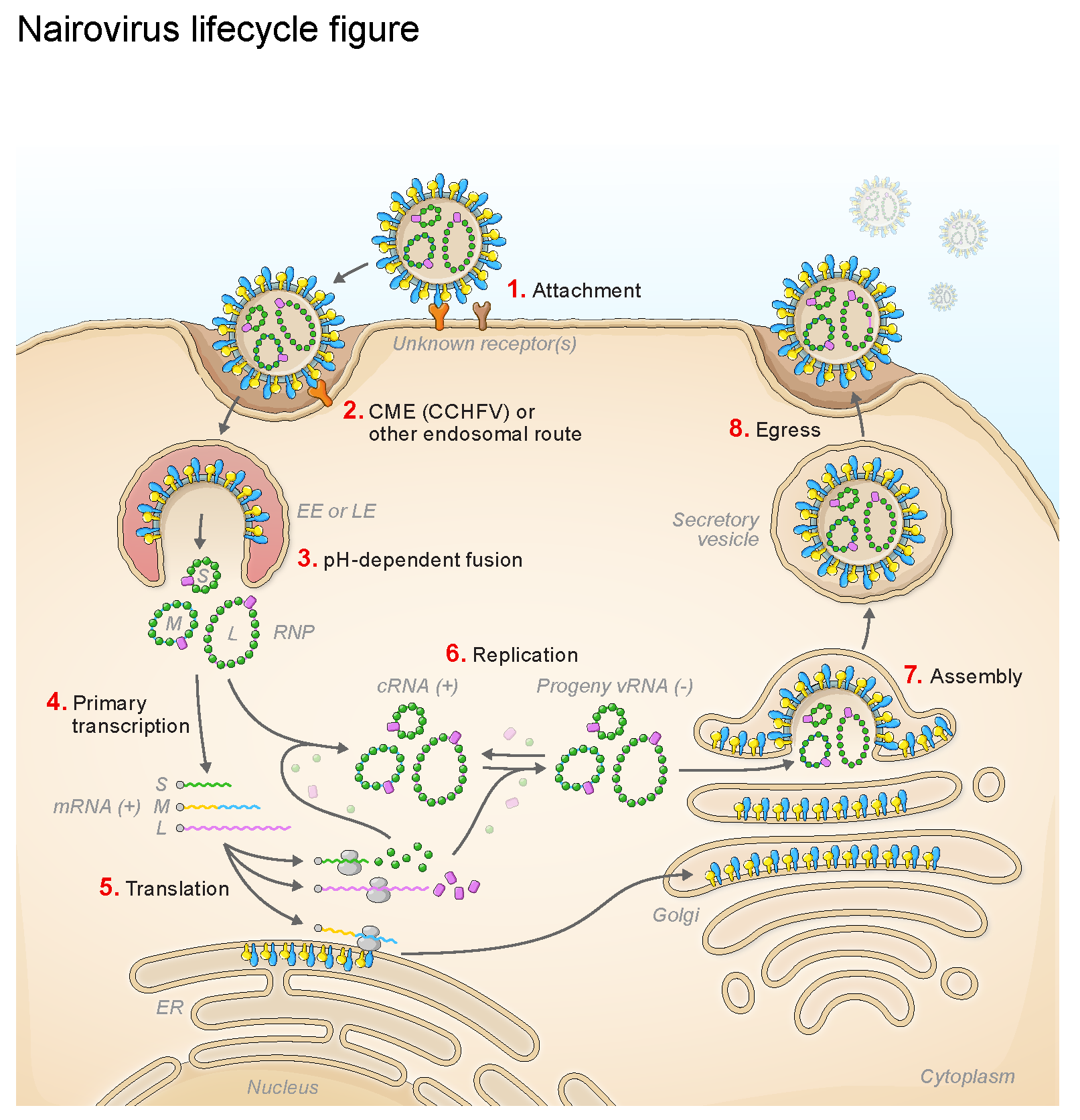
Nairovirus life cycle

The ambisense genome requires two rounds of transcription to be carried out. First, the negative-sense RNA is transcribed to produce mRNA and a full-length replicative intermediate. From this intermediate, a subgenomic mRNA encoding the small segment nonstructural protein is produced while the polymerase produced following the first round of transcription can now replicate the full-length RNA to produce viral genomes.

Bunyaviruses replicate in the cytoplasm, while the viral proteins transit through the ER and Golgi apparatus. Mature virions bud from the Golgi apparatus into vesicles which are transported to the cell surface.

=== Transmission ===
Bunyaviruses infect arthropods, plants, protozoans, and vertebrates. Plants (e.g. tomato, pigeonpea, melon, wheat, raspberry, redbud, and rose) can host bunyaviruses from the families Tospoviridae and Fimoviridae. Members of some families are insect-specific, for example the phasmavirids, first isolated from phantom midges, and since identified in diverse insects including moths, wasps and bees, and other true flies.

== Taxonomy ==
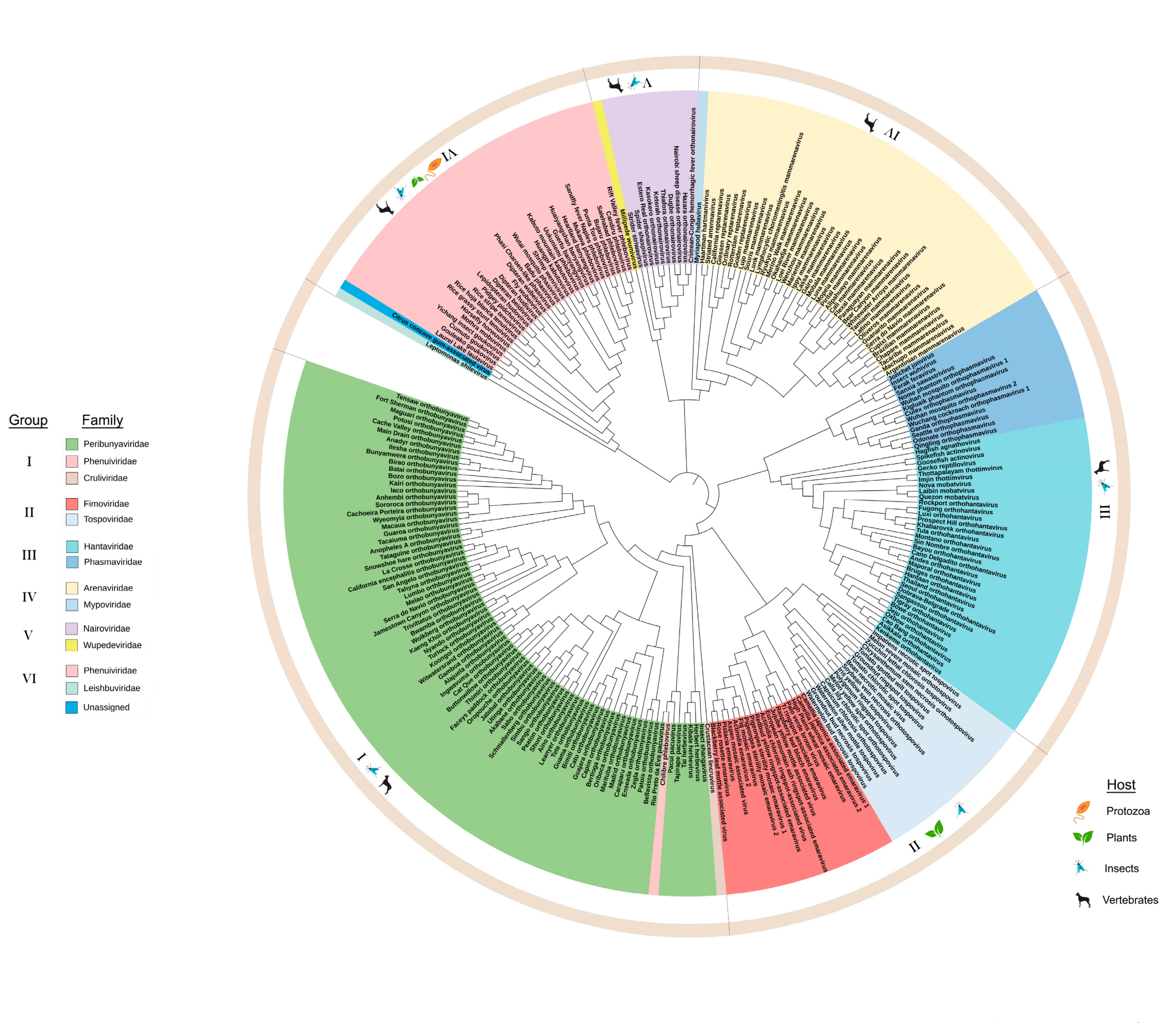
Phylogenetic tree of Bunyaviricetes

The class Bunyaviricetes contains two orders which contain 16 families. These taxa are listed hereafter (-virales denotes order and -viridae denotes family):

- Elliovirales
  - Cruliviridae
  - Fimoviridae
  - Hantaviridae
  - Peribunyaviridae
  - Phasmaviridae
  - Tospoviridae
  - Tulasviridae
- Hareavirales
  - Arenaviridae
  - Discoviridae
  - Konkoviridae
  - Leishbuviridae
  - Mypoviridae
  - Nairoviridae
  - Phenuiviridae
  - Tosoviridae
  - Wupedeviridae

== Diseases in humans ==
Bunyaviruses that cause disease in humans include:

- California encephalitis virus, Jamestown Canyon virus, La Crosse encephalitis virus, Oropouche virus, and Snowshoe hare virus (vector: mosquitoes; family: Peribunyaviridae);
- Hantavirus reservoir: small mammals or rodents (vector: aerosolized excreta from these mammals; family: Hantaviridae);
- Crimean–Congo hemorrhagic fever reservoir and (vector: ticks; amplifying hosts and vector: small mammals, domestic mammals; family: Nairoviridae);
- Rift Valley fever (reservoir: bats; vector: mosquitoes; amplifying hosts: small and domestic mammals; family: Phenuiviridae);
- Bwamba Fever (reservoir: monkeys; vector: mosquitoes; amplifying hosts: donkeys; family: Peribunyaviridae);
- Severe fever with thrombocytopenia syndrome (vector: ticks);
- Lassa fever and Argentine hemorrhagic fever (reservoir: rodents; vector: aerosolized excreta from these mammals; family: Arenaviridae).

Bunyaviruses have segmented genomes, making them capable of rapid reassortment and increasing the risk of outbreak. The bunyavirus that causes severe fever with thrombocytopenia syndrome can undergo recombination both by reassortment of genome segments and by intragenic homologous recombination. Bunyaviruses are transmitted by hematophagous arthropods including mosquitoes, midges, flies, and ticks. The viral incubation period is about 48 hours. Symptomatic infection typically causes non-specific flu-like symptoms with fever lasting for about three days. Because of their non-specific symptoms, Bunyavirus infections are frequently mistaken for other illnesses. For example, Bwamba fever is often mistaken for malaria.

== Prevention ==
Prevention depends on the reservoir, amplifying hosts and how the viruses are transmitted, i.e. the vector, whether ticks or mosquitoes and which animals are involved. Preventive measures include general hygiene, limiting contact with vector saliva, urine, feces, or bedding. There is no licensed vaccine for bunyaviruses. As precautions Cache Valley virus and Hantavirus research are conducted in BSL-2 (or higher), Rift Valley Fever virus research is conducted in BSL-3 (or higher), Congo-Crimean Hemorrhagic Fever virus research is conducted in BSL-4 laboratories.

== Timeline ==
1940s: Crimean–Congo hemorrhagic fever is discovered in Russia

1951: 3,000 cases of Hantavirus were reported in South Korea in 1951, a time when UN forces were fighting on the 38th parallel during the Korean War

1956: Cache Valley virus isolated in Culiseta inornata mosquitoes in Utah

1960: La Crosse virus was first recognized in a fatal case of encephalitis in La Crosse, Wisconsin

1977: Rift Valley Fever virus caused approximately 200,000 cases and 598 deaths in Egypt

2017: Bunyavirales order is created.
