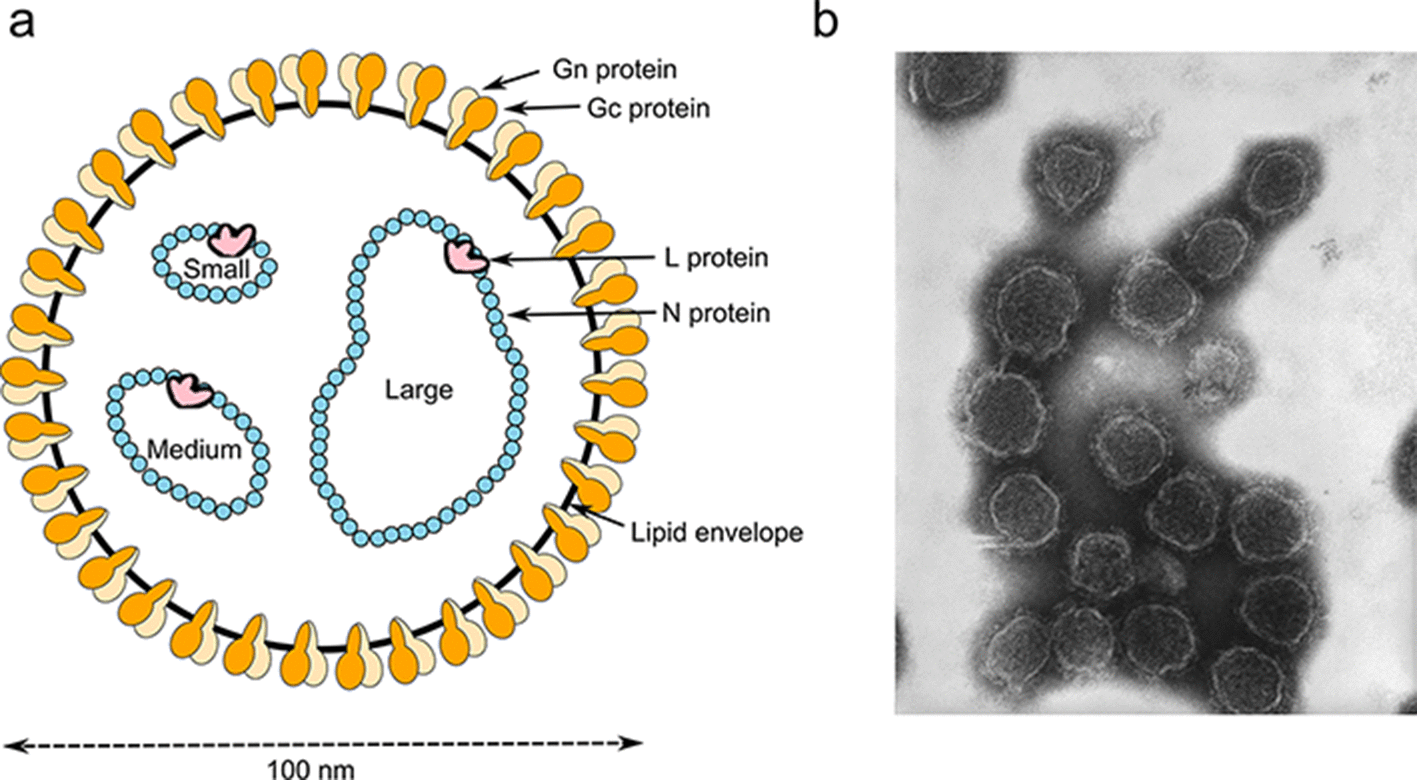
- Peribunyavirus structure (left); transmission electron micrograph of California encephalitis virus (right)

Virus classification
- (unranked): Virus
- Realm: Riboviria
- Kingdom: Orthornavirae
- Phylum: Negarnaviricota
- Class: Bunyaviricetes
- Order: Elliovirales
- Family: Peribunyaviridae

Genera
- See text

= Peribunyaviridae =

Family of viruses

Peribunyaviridae is a family of viruses in the order Elliovirales. Its name partially derives from Bunyamwera, Uganda, where the founding species was first isolated.

== Taxonomy ==
The family contains the following genera:

- Gryffinivirus
- Herbevirus
- Khurdivirus
- Lakivirus
- Lambavirus
- Orthobunyavirus
- Pacuvirus
- Shangavirus

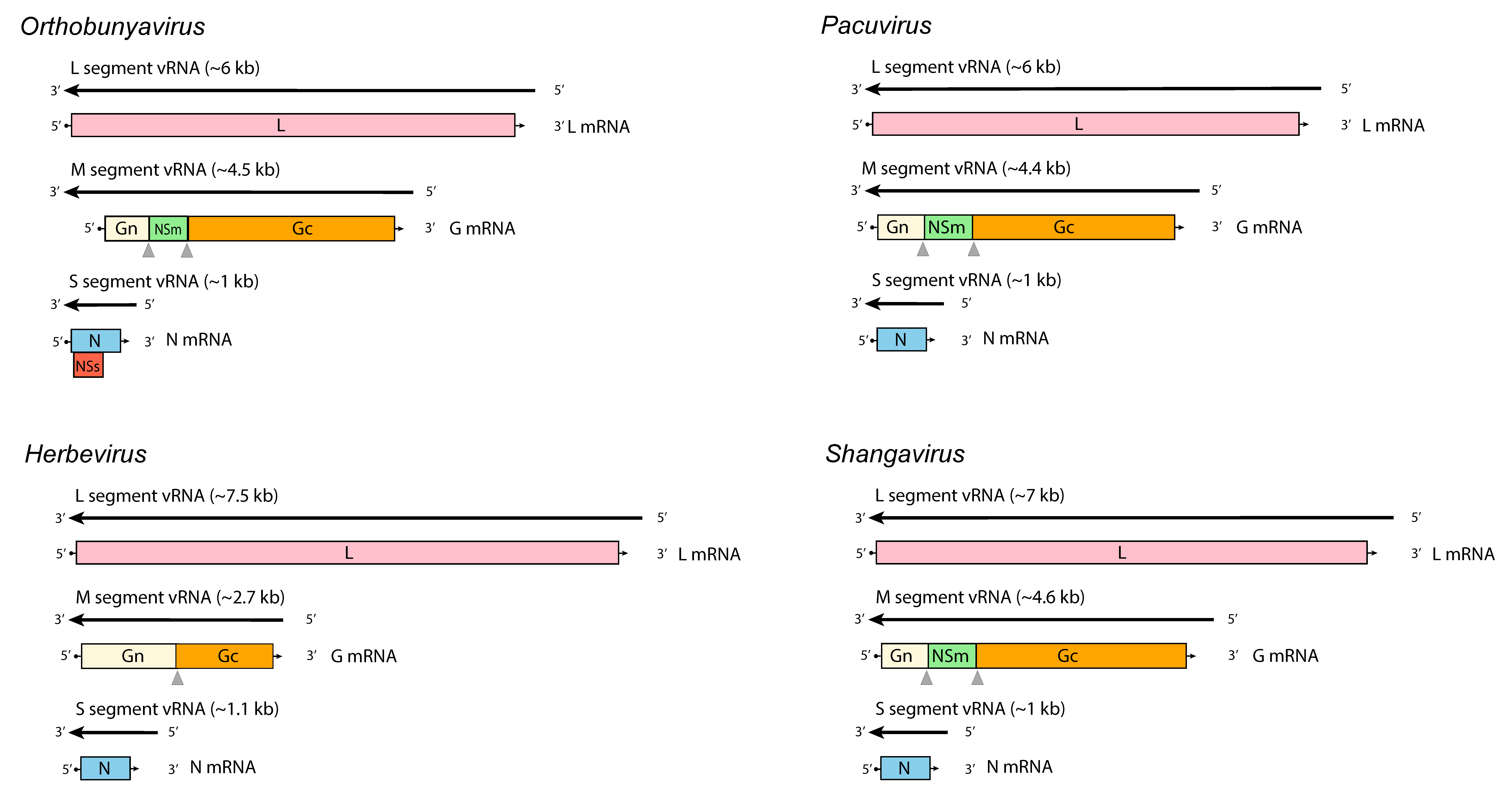
Genomes of orthobunyavirus, herbevirus, pacuvirus and shangavirus of the family Peribunyaviridae
