= Kelser =

Kelser is a surname. Notable people with the surname include:

- Raymond Alexander Kelser (1892–1952), US Army veterinary bacteriologist
- Ryan Kesler (born 1984), American ice hockey player
- Greg Kelser (born 1957), American basketball player and color commentator

== See also ==
- Elser
- Kelsey (surname)
- Kesler
