= Pannes =

Pannes may refer to the following places in France:

- Pannes, Loiret, a commune in the Loiret department
- Pannes, Meurthe-et-Moselle, a commune in the Meurthe-et-Moselle department

Pannes may also refer to salt pannes and pools, depressions in salt water marshes.
