= Rémy Julienne =

French racing driver (1930–2021)

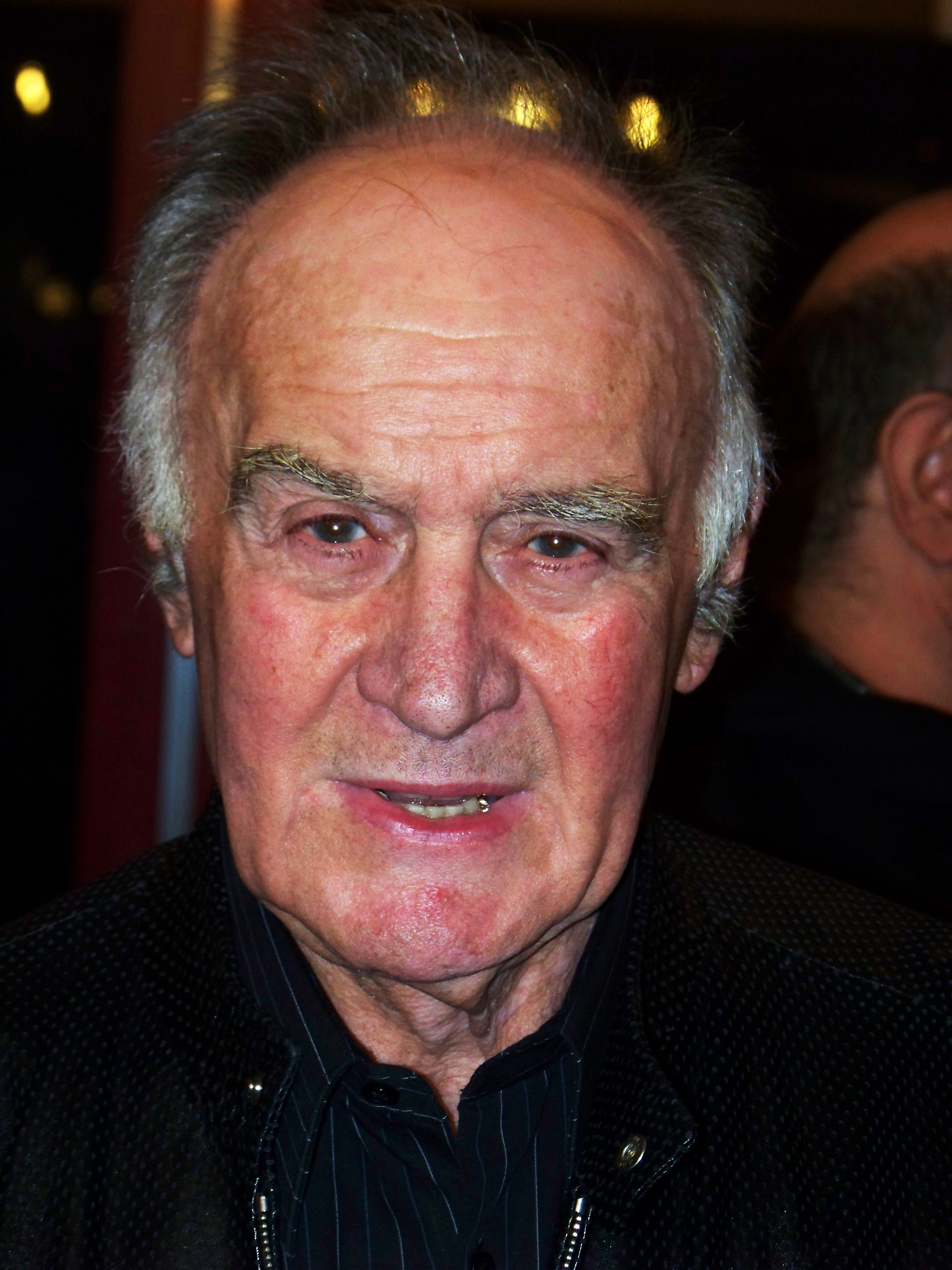
- Rémy Julienne in 2009
- Born: 17 April 1930; Cepoy, France
- Died: 21 January 2021 (aged 90); Amilly, France
- Occupations: Stunt coordinator, stunt performer

Rémy Julienne (French pronunciation: [ʁemi ʒyljɛn]; 17 April 1930 – 21 January 2021) was a French driving stunt performer and coordinator, assistant director and occasional actor. He was also a rallycross champion and 1956 French motocross champion.

== Early life ==
Julienne was born in 1930, the son of café owners in the town of Cepoy, 110 km south-east of Paris. During World War II, he was dared by children evacuated from Paris to ride a bicycle across the local canal, which inspired him to start riding motocross.

== Career ==
In his early 20's, Julienne became French motocross champion in 1957, which brought him to the attention of eminent stunt co-coordinator Gil Delamare. Through Delamare, Julienne's first screen appearance in 1964 was replacing actor Jean Marais, and in 1966 he played a German army motorcyclist in La Grande Vadrouille.

After Delamare's tragic death during a stunt in 1966, Julienne stepped-in and agreed to fulfill contracts Delamare had signed with various film studios. Julienne's scientific approach which created spectacular on-screen images garnered him admiration within the industry in an age before computer modelling. Working initially in French film and TV, and occasional Hollywood films shot in Europe, his developing reputation led to his employment on the British film The Italian Job. Producer Michael Deeley later commented that “During our initial meeting with Rémy, Peter Collinson [the film’s director] and I were delighted to discover that he was prepared to take the chase sequence even further than we had envisaged, suggesting a different range of hair-raising stunts that could be written into the script.” Julienne planned and co-ordinated all of the vehicle sequences, including the epic Mini chase sequence through the streets and roof tops of Turin.

Very often people ask, ‘what was my favourite stunt?’ I’d say the jump between the two Fiat factory roofs must be the one, because it was emotional, because it was difficult. We worked on the ground, we prepared the ramps, calculated distances, speeds etc. [Originally] it was decided I had to do three separate jumps in each Mini. I explained that, as the roof was very wide, we could make the three Minis jump all together… it looked much better as a shot. It was more complicated, but really amazing.

Julienne resultantly became Hollywood's go-to vehicle stunt coordinator, best publicly known for his stunts on six James Bond films, five of which were directed by John Glen. Julienne became known for Bond sequences which made ordinary cars do extraordinary things, such as the Citroën 2CV in For Your Eyes Only, the Renault 11 in A View to a Kill, and the petrol semi-tanker in Licence to Kill in which a Kenworth performed a wheelie. "The tanker chase was the most dangerous sequence I ever devised” said Glen, who also noted that Julienne was fastidious in his preparation.

Julienne was eventually involved in over 1,400 films. His choreographed stunt sequences were usually destructive, with high-speed chases and highly realistic vehicle behaviour. French car manufacturers, notably Renault and Citroën, frequently called on his services for their TV and film commercials, and he had a noted partnership with Italian manufacturer Fiat in the 1980s. In November 2005, Julienne was contracted by French TV station M6 to consult on a French-language remake of the 1970s series Starsky and Hutch.

In 1999 during the filming of Taxi 2, written and produced by Luc Besson and directed by Gérard Krawczyk, a stunt sequence caused the death of a cameraman Alain Dutartre and the serious injury of the cameraman's assistant. Clearing Besson's firm EuropaCorp of all charges, the Prosecutor held Julienne solely responsible accusing him of "not taking all the necessary measures for the security of the stunt in question" and notably to have "neglected the speed calculations of the car and the length of the jump", handing Julienne an 18-month suspended jail sentence and a €13,000 fine. Julienne appealed, accusing Besson's production company EuropaCorp of taking short cuts in safety equipment, and rejecting Julienne's offers to trial the car scene in question due to cost. The Paris Court of Appeal reversed the ruling in June 2009, and ordered EuropaCorp pay €100,000. Julienne's jail sentence was reduced to six months, and his fine reduced to €2,000, but he was required to pay the Dutartre family €50,000 in court costs.

Julienne began a school in France to provide drivers and mechanics with the specialized skills needed for stunt work. He also coordinated the attraction Moteurs... Action! Stunt Show Spectacular at Walt Disney Studios Park in Paris.

Julienne's sons Michel and Dominique are also highly skilled stunt drivers/coordinators, and now run the family business.

== Death ==
Hospitalised in Amilly near Montargis in early January 2021, Julienne died from COVID-19 on the evening of 21 January 2021, during the COVID-19 pandemic in France.
