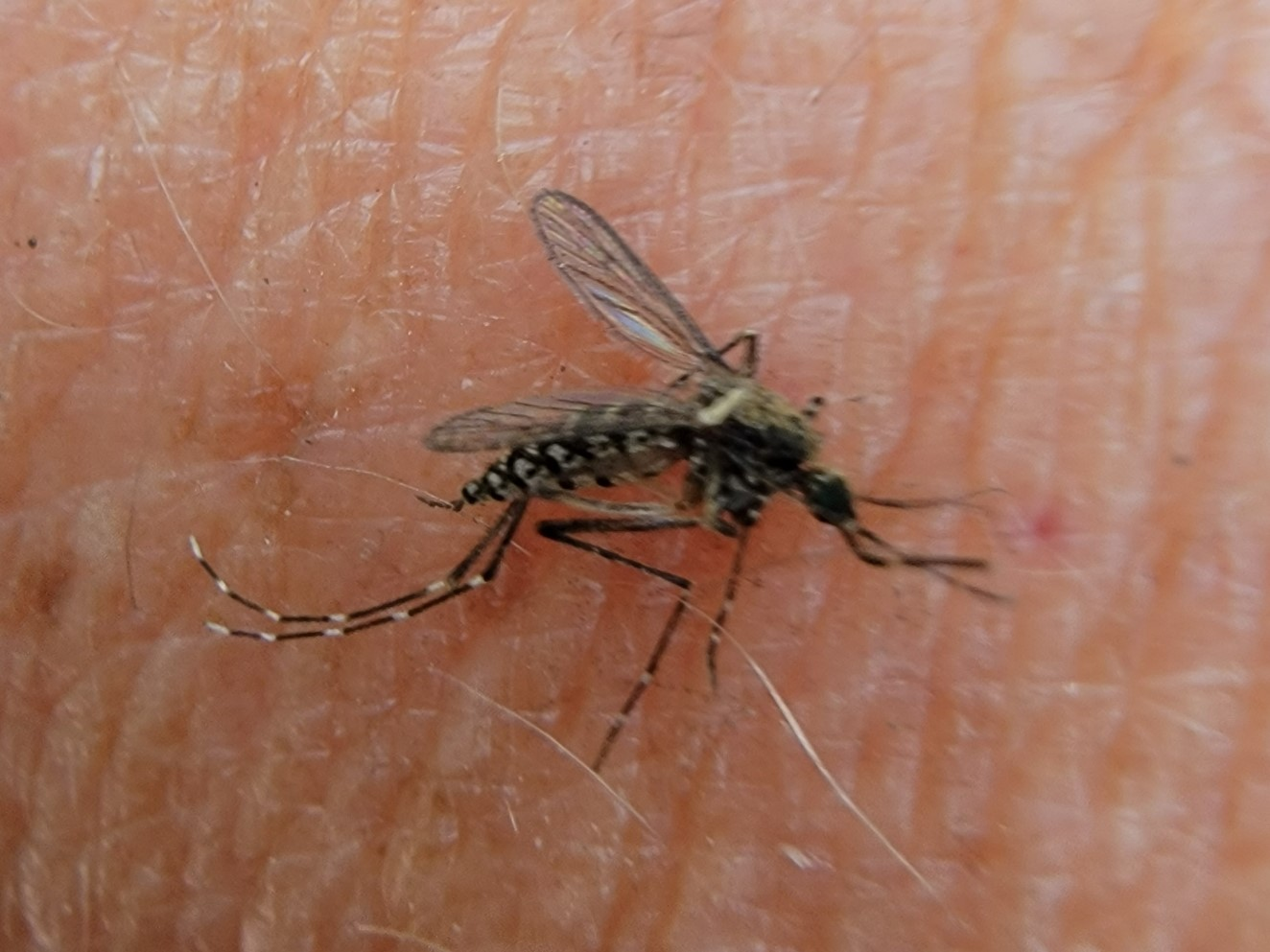

Scientific classification
- Kingdom: Animalia
- Phylum: Arthropoda
- Clade: Pancrustacea
- Class: Insecta
- Order: Diptera
- Family: Culicidae
- Genus: Aedes
- Subgenus: Ochlerotatus
- Species: A. taeniorhynchus

Binomial name
- Aedes taeniorhynchus (Wiedemann, 1821)

Synonyms
- Culex damnosus (Say, 1823); Culex taeniorhynchus (Wiedemann, 1821); Ochlerotatus taeniorhynchus

= Aedes taeniorhynchus =

Species of mosquito

Aedes taeniorhynchus, or the black salt marsh mosquito, is a mosquito in the family Culicidae. It is a carrier for encephalitic viruses including Venezuelan equine encephalitis and can transmit Dirofilaria immitis. It resides in the Americas and is known to bite mammals, reptiles, and birds. Like other mosquitoes, Ae. taeniorhynchus adults survive on a combination diet of blood and sugar, with females generally requiring a blood meal before laying eggs.

This mosquito has been studied to investigate its development, physiological markers, and behavioral patterns, including periodic cycles for biting, flight, and swarming. This species is noted for developing in periodic cycles, with high sensitivity to light and flight patterns that result in specific wingbeat frequencies that allow for both species detection and sex distinction.

Ae. taeniorhynchus is known to be a pest to humans and mechanisms for controlling Ae. taeniorhynchus populations have been developed. The United States has spent millions of dollars to control and contain Ae. taeniorhynchus.

== Taxonomy ==
German entomologist Christian Rudolph Wilhelm Wiedemann described Ae. (Ochlerotatus) taeniorhynchus in 1821. Alternate namings for the species include Culex taeniorhynchus (Wiedemann, 1821), Ochlerotatus taeniorhynchus (Wiedemann, 1821), and Culex damnosus (Say 1823).

Aedes niger, also known as Aedes portoricensis, is a subspecies of Ae. taeniorhynchus. It can be identified by its last posterior tarsal joint, which is mostly black rather than banded in white. It resides in Florida and can migrate as far as 95 miles (153 km).

Analysis of microsatellite data on the genes of Ae. taeniorhynchus living in the Galapagos Islands show genetic differentiation between coastal and highland mosquito populations. Data indicates minimal gene flow between the populations that only occurs during periods of heightened rainfall. Genetic differences suggest that habitat differences led to driving adaptation and divergence in the species, eventually leading to future speciation. Highland mosquitoes have population features characteristic of a founder effect due to low genetic diversity manifesting as low heterozygosity and low allelic richness, which may have resulted from egg dormancy during periods of dryness.

== Description ==
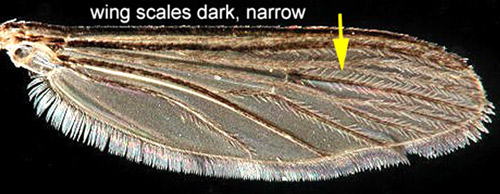
Aedes taeniorhynchus adult wing

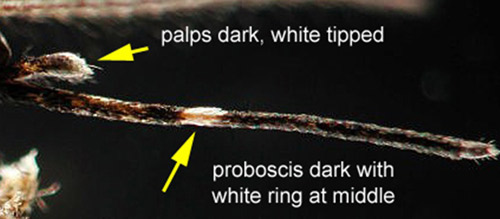
Aedes taeniorhynchus adult proboscis

Ae. taeniorhynchus adults are mostly black with areas of white banding. A single white band appears at the center of the proboscis, multiple white bands span the distal ends of the legs following the leg joints, and the last hind leg joints are completely colored white. Ae. taeniorhynchus wings are long and narrow with scaled wing veins. Experimental investigation of evolutionary coloration of Ae. taeniorhynchus yielded negative results. Mosquitoes reared in conditions of darkness, backgrounds colored black, white, or green, and lighting conditions of fluorescent light or sunlight, showed no color changes in the fat body nor in the head capsule, saddle, or siphon. This lack of cryptic coloring is suggested to be due to a lack of threat to the species; because the species habitat is a temporary water source used for larval growth, this temporary environment has few predators and relatively little danger.

Males and females can be distinguished based on their antennae: males have plumose (feather-like) antennae while females antennae are sparsely haired.

=== Noise detection ===
Ae. taeniorhynchus swarms can be detected through sound. Noises with frequencies between 0.3 and 3.4 kHz at sound level 21 dB are detectable across 10–50 m in distance. An individual mosquito can be heard across 2–5 cm in distance when sound level rises to 22-25 dB. Male and female mosquitoes can also be distinguished by their wingbeat frequencies, which are 700–800 Hz for males and 400–500 Hz for females. As a result, flight sounds are used to determine flight activity and distinguish sex of groups.

=== Microbiome ===
Aedes mosquitoes have a characteristic microbiome that modulate the effects of diet. Microbiome makeup is reported to differ between males and females in Aedes mosquitoes, such as Aedes albopictus and Aedes aegypti. Namely, in Aedes albopictus, males feed on nectar to acquire Actinomycetota while females contain Pseudomonadota (such as Enterobacteriaceae) that mediate levels of redox stress caused by feeding on blood-meals.

=== Similar species ===
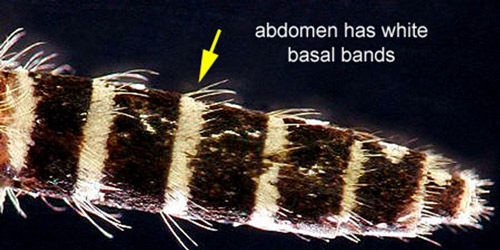
Aedes taeniorhynchus adult abdomen

The main physical distinctions between Ae. taeniorhynchus and other species come from the white banding that covers several body parts along Ae. taeniorhynchus. The species, like other Aedes mosquitoes, exhibits basal banding of the abdomen, but Ae. taeniorhynchus also uniquely exhibits white-tipped palps and a central white ring on the proboscis.

This species looks similar to Aedes sollicitans, except for subtle differences in the larval and adult stages. In the larval stage, Ae. taeniorhynchus has a shorter breathing tube, its scale patches are rounded instead of pointed at the tips, and spines that line the edges of each scale patch are smaller near the scale patch base. In the adult stage, Ae. taeniorhynchus is smaller and mostly black while Ae. sollicitans is golden brown.

The species also bears similarity to Aedes jacobinae, which falls within the Taeniorhynchus subgenus due to its particular hypopygium structure, but it is considered a distinct species because it does not have leg markings. Similarly, this species can also be distinguished from Aedes albopictus, commonly known as the Asian Tiger Mosquito, as Ae. taeniorhynchus, unlike Ae. albopictus, does not have markings on its back.

== Distribution ==
Ae. taeniorhynchus is widely distributed across North and South America, though more highly concentrated in southern regions. At the time of the fly's initial discovery the species resided in coastal regions, and then gradually moved towards the interior of the Americas. Gene flow analysis derived from microsatellite data indicated that mosquitoes located in the Galapagos Island in the Pacific Island frequently migrate between islands on an isolation by distance basis. Incidence of ports was a strong factor contributing to migration, suggesting human-aided transport contributed to inter-island migration.

== Habitat ==
Example of mangrove habitat

Ae. taeniorhynchus resides in habitats with a temporary water source, making mangrove and salt marshes or other areas with moist soil popular locations for egg laying and immature growth. These habitats are highly variable but often have high salinity with an observed soluble salt content in soil of at least 1644 ppm.

In the case of environmental conditions of dryness and low temperatures which are unfavorable for egg hatching, eggs can remain dormant for years. Factors controlling the scale of A. taeniorhynchus growth during pre-emergence depend on environmental conditions matching moisture level and temperature. In Southern Florida, the main factors are tide height and amount of rainfall, while sites in California rely on tide height alone. In Virginia, these factors are limited to levels of rainfall and temperature. Generally favorable factors can turn negative at extreme values, causing survival rate to decline. Excess water washes mosquito eggs away and extremely high temperatures can lead to water source evaporation.

This species exhibits sensitivity to temperature, with differences found for constant, split, and alternating temperatures. At constant temperatures of 22, 27, and 32 °C, life span increased with temperature, but at split temperatures, mosquitoes were also split between life and death. At different temperatures, the rate of aging was independent in males, but higher for females living at 22 and 27 °C. At alternating temperatures, life spans were temperature independent for all sexes and temperatures, except for favoring of alternation between 22 and 27 °C by females.

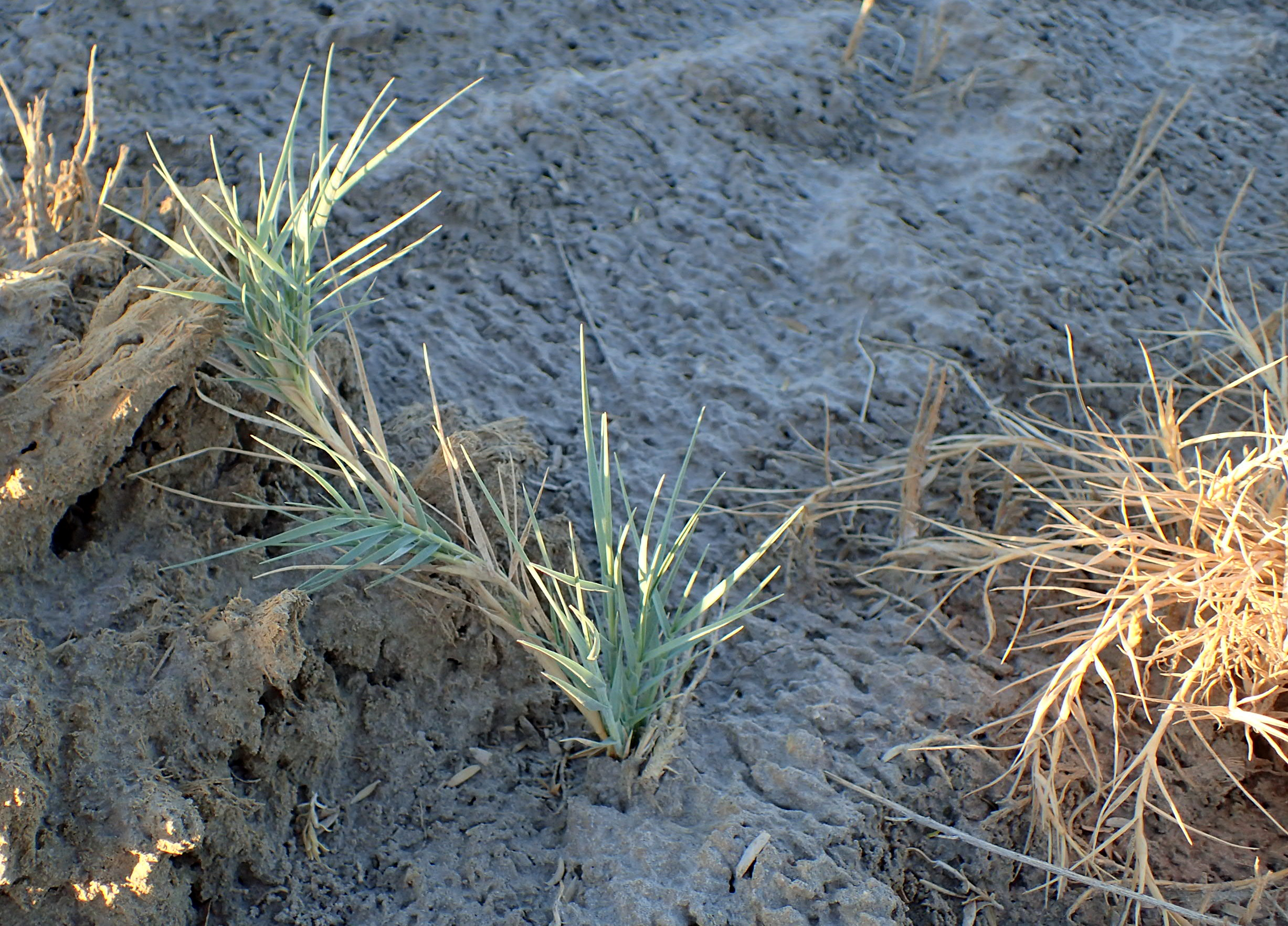
Mating sites for Aedes taeniorhynchus are often in contact with Distichlis spicata

Breeding locations for Ae. taeniorhynchus are often in contact with vegetation such as Distichlis spicata (spike grass) and Spartina patens (salt meadow hay) in grass salt marshes and Batis maritima (saltwort) and species from the Salicornia genus (glassworts) in mangroves. This species of mosquito is found in close proximity to other mosquitoes that reside in marches. These include Aedes sollicitans (eastern salt marsh mosquito), Anopheles bradleyi, and A. atropos.

== Life history ==
According to observational field studies, Ae. taeniorhynchus carries out several behavioral trends at different stages of life. Growth and pupation of this species were found to be affected by environmental factors of nutrition, population density, salinity, light-dark, and temperature.

=== Eggs ===
Females lay eggs on dry ground, and egg hatching is triggered by the presence of water, such as rain or flooding. Egg laying yield from females, an indicator of fecundity, differs based on diet: in populations of low autogeny, rare autogenous females each laid less than 30 eggs, while egg yield was significantly higher in populations with majority autogenous females. Eggs laid in the right temperature and humidity conditions undergo embryogenesis, then stay dormant until hatching.

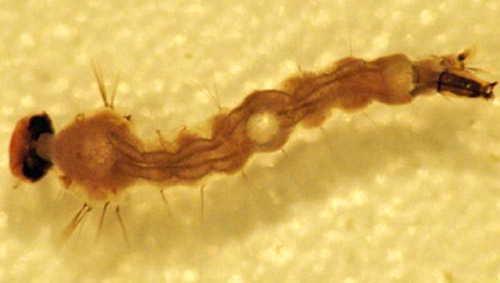
4th larval instar

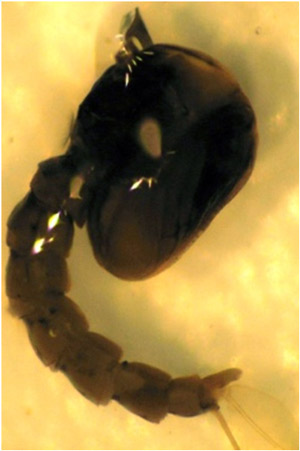
Pupa

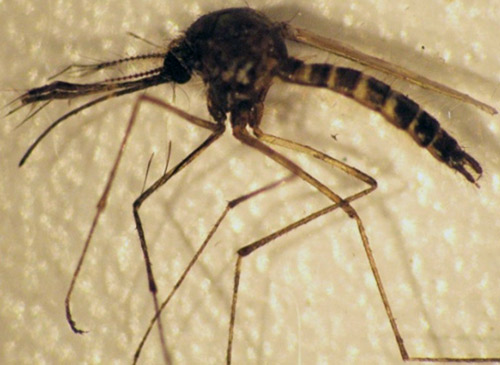
Adult male

Aedes taeniorhynchus stages in life cycle

=== Larval in-stars ===
Upon hatching, the species progresses through 4 larval instars: the first 3 instars are affected primarily by temperature, with minor effects by salinity; the fourth instar is affected by all environmental factors. In the fourth instar, increased food sped up development time while crowding and salinity stunted growth.

Preferred temperature for all 4 instars is between 30 °C and 38 °C but average preferred temperature increases with age. The first instar prefers an average temperature of 31.8 °C and the early fourth instar prefers a temperature of 34.6°. The late fourth instar, however, has a lower preferred temperature than the early fourth instar, at 33.0°. Starved larvae were found to have a wider preferred temperature range that is centered around lower temperatures. Laboratory larval colonies cultured for years 27.0 °C were found to prefer consistently lower temperatures.

Fourth-instar larvae were noted to drink sea water (100 nL/h) and secrete hyperosmotic fluid through the rectum. This fluid is similar to seawater but with 18-fold higher potassium levels. Because the secreted fluid does not allow for osmotic balance with the ingested fluid, studies suggest that the anal papillae aid in salt secretion.

=== Pupa ===
All environmental factors affect pupation regarding the insect's diurnal rhythm, which has a period of 21.5 hours. Factors leading to an increased pupa period include erase of light-dark cycles with all dark or all light conditions, increased salinity, and crowding. These trends continued to adhere to a preference for temperatures close to 27 °C or 32 °C. Pupa also exhibit differential aggregation formation due to these environmental factors. Cluster type aggregations form alongside temporary crowding and excess of food while ball type aggregations may manifest out of temporary crowding but lack of food. At lower constant temperatures of 22 °C and 25 °C, cluster type aggregations may form but higher temperatures of 30° and 32 °C inhibit aggregation formation. Aggregations produced pupa with slightly heavier dry body weights and promoted developmental synchronization in ecdysis and greater likelihood of migration at emergence.

=== Adult stages ===
Males and females mosquitoes emerge from their egg sites in similar ways. They remain in their sources of water for 12–24 hours. Adults then migrate away from the egg laying ground over the course of 1–4 days. Different sexes exhibit differential migration, with most females traveling at least 20 miles (32 km), and most males traveling no farther than 2 miles (3.2 km). Female migration follows a random pattern with no limitation on migration direction and migration occurring along a 5-day cycle. Males initially travel with females until they hit a 1–2 miles (1.6–3.2 km) stopping point, where they replace migration with swarming.

Flight patterns become established in the adult stage and are not affected by behavioral patterns from earlier stages of life. Adults begin biting at day 4 and follow a 5-day cycle until death. Between the sexes, peak biting intensity occurs in females at ages 4, 9, and 14 days. Adult female mosquitoes continue living and laying eggs for 3–4 weeks before dying. Those that survive longer continue to bite but stop laying eggs.

== Food resources ==
=== Blood ===
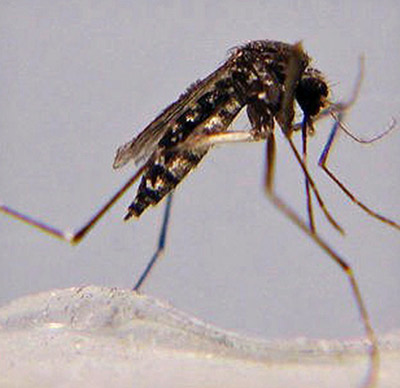
Adult female Aedes taeniorhynchus

Ae. taeniorhynchus eggs can mature both autogenously and anautogenously, with autogenous eggs feeding on sugar and anautogenous eggs requiring a blood meal. These food sources promote maturation by producing hormones from the corpora allata (CA) and medial neurosecretory cell perikarya (MNCA), of which only MNCA hormone release is responsible for anautogenous maturation. Larval dependence on a blood meal can be influenced to make mosquitoes less autogenous, by not allowing females to feed on sugar and imposing other dietary changes.

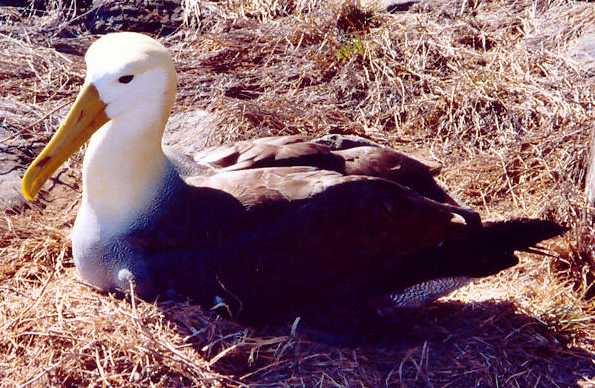
Aedes taeniorhynchus is an ectoparasite of waved albatrosses

Adult mosquitoes feed on a combination diet of blood and sugar, with the optimal diet consisting of sugar for males and both blood and sugar for females. Most Ae. taeniorhynchus rely on mammals and birds for blood meals, especially depending on bovine, rabbits, and armadillos. Mosquitoes in the Galapagos Islands feed on mammals and reptiles, with equal preference but feed little on birds. Since this differs from the typical feeding of Ae. taeniorhynchus on birds, studies suggest the species is an opportunistic feeder, in which it feeds more on the most readily available, easily accessible organisms. Ae. taeniorhynchus acts as an ectoparasite to Diomedea irrorata, known as waved albatrosses. Mosquitoes bite the waved albatrosses, directly leading to or transmitting diseases that cause nestling mortality, colony migration, or egg desertion in albatrosses.

Experimental studies show that both sexes can survive on a sugar-only diet for 2–3 months, but females require blood meals for egg production. In females, supplementation of a blood meal in autogenous mosquitoes increased both egg production and lifespan. Additional observational studies of Ae. taeniorhynchus in nature showed that habitat impacts the effect of the meal source: females inhabiting mangrove swamps could produce eggs even without blood meals, but those from a grassy salt marsh environment could not. Females from both habitats, however, were still able to produce eggs when given blood meals.

=== Sugar ===
Studies observing unrestricted sugar intake of females correlated sucrose intake level with maximum accumulation of stored energy reserves. In contrast, sucrose intake level does not correlate with decreased activity or changes in senescence.

Carbohydrate feedings of female mosquitoes in a laboratory setting indicated that carbohydrates glucose, fructose, mannose, galactose, sucrose, trehalose, melibiose, maltose, raffinose, melizitose, dextrin, mannitol, and sorbitol are most effective to aid survival; arabinose, rhamnose, fucose, sorbose, lactose, cellobiose, inulin, a-methyl mannoside, dulcitol, and inositol are not used by the species; xylose, glycogen, a-methyl glucoside, and glycerol are used but at a slow metabolic rate; and sorbose could not be metabolized. Feeding with glucose allowed for maximum flight speed while other carbohydrates, such as all pentoses, sorbose, lactose, cellobiose, glycogen, inulin, a-methyl mannoside, dulcitol, and inositol were insufficient to allow flight, indicated by a delay in flight after feeding.

=== Nectar ===
If emergence occurs at a location with flowers, both sexes feed on nectar prior to migration. Analysis of fructose and glycogen content indicate that mosquitoes often feed on nectar soon after dark and feed sparingly on nectar during the day.

== Behavior ==
=== Mating ===
Males become sexually mature about 2 days after emergence, and females become sexually mature at an age of 12 days, with plans to mate only once.

Observational studies of mating interactions both in a laboratory setting and field setting noted copulation between mosquitoes occurring after sunset. Results noted that copulation depends on age of females, with insemination occurring with females of ages 30–40 hours. In both settings studied, females are capable of mating without inducing insemination, as only 1% of females contained sperm after 2 notes of potential mating. Mating not only provides an opportunity for insemination but also contributes to vitellogenin synthesis in females, as experimental injections of male accessory gland fluid (MAGF) has been shown to cause release of corpus cardiacum (CC) stimulating factor in the ovaries, which spurs research of egg development neurosecretory hormone (EDNH).

Other laboratory studies of the species noted an age dependence in both females and males for successful copulation and insemination. Copulation is initiated by males and only occurs when the male first disengages its legs, interlocks the male and female genitalia in an end-to-end position, and then hangs from the female for a short duration of time. Insemination can only result from copulation. If copulation is successful, the mosquitoes pair in flight, then land and remain together for a few seconds. To end copulation, the male flies away or the female flies while carrying the male until it falls.

Most young females rejected copulation attempts (unreceptive), and many of those that copulated rejected insemination attempts (refractory), with acceptance of copulation and insemination (receptive) both increasing with female age when exposed to an older male cohort. Unreceptive females avoided males by flying away with sudden increases in speed or sharp turns.

During mating, males can transfer substances produced from their accessory glands that affect female physiology and behavior. These accessory gland substances can limit or improve female reproductive activities. Limitations include temporarily prevention of future female mating, oviposition stimulation, and reduced host-seeking while improvements involve changes to female circadian rhythm and metabolic priorities that cause higher chance of reproduction.

=== Parental care ===
Females are known to practice oviposition, with preference for high moisture soils, with water saturation greater than 70%. Female clutch sizes are 100-200 eggs, with at least one clutch laid per female.

In experimental studies with ovariectomized female mosquitoes, females were unable to synthesize vitellogenin, a yolk-protein precursor, unless given a donor ovary from a sugar-fed or blood-fed mosquito. Vitellogenin synthesis still occurred when the donor ovary came from Ae. aegypti, and ovary derivation from a blood-fed mosquito caused corpus cardiacum stimulating factor production, indicating that the hormonal processes for oviposition are not species specific.

In a study of eggs laid in Rhizophora mangle L. (red mangrove) and Avicennia germinans L. (black mangrove) forest basins, egg occurrence was correlated with elevation and detritus level. Oviposition was directed from black mangrove basins to red mangrove basins, possibly due to reduced detritus and reduced organic content in the soil caused by black mangrove grazing by Melampus coffeus L., a snail. Because eggshells and eggs share the same habitat, it is suggested that oviposition may be delineated using eggshells. Eggshell sampling analysis from 34 mangrove forest sites indicated that all mangrove basin forests can yield successful Ae. taeniorhynchus production, regardless of forest geomorphology, soil, and vegetation but recently flooded sites are most optimal.

Additionally, sulfates and other salts were deemed favorable to ovipositing females in a laboratory setting but sulfate concentrations in the field may be too low for this effect to be significant. Substrate texture was also determined to be a factor contributing to oviposition, with studies of egg laying on sand particle size indicating a preference for sand particles sized from 0.33 to 0.62 mm.

=== Flight cycles ===
Adult female mosquitoes ready to lay eggs differ from other adult females in many important behaviors. They perform a special flight at ages 7, 12, and 17, following a 5-day cycle. Changes in diet have effects on flight in males and females: males fed sugar alone exhibited changes in flight patterns that resembled cyclic swarming, females fed sugar alone exhibited consistent flight patterns consisting of a 4-week cycle of flight 40 minutes during dark and 20 minutes during light, females fed sugar and blood experienced reduced flight after 2 weeks, and females fed blood alone flew no more than 10 days. Starved females later fed blood stayed sedentary for 8 hours before returning to flight. Flights are occur with the purpose of acquiring nectar, with flight distance depending on wind speed, direction, landscape, and nectar availability. Females typically fly 2–5 miles in search of nectar, but flights ranging 30 miles have been recorded as a result of other flight factors. Adults searching for a blood meal may also fly up to 25 miles.

Flight patterns are these mosquitoes are closely related to light sensitivity, as flight patterns increase with strength of moonlight: females increase flight activity from 95% at quarter moon to 546% at full moon. Male and female adult mosquitoes are repelled by light, allowing mosquitoes to be caught with light traps. However, females ready to lay eggs to not exhibit this behavior. In an experimental setting, mosquitoes raised under conditions of 12 hr light : 12 hr dark were found to exhibit flight activity at both light-off and light-on periods in a bimodal alternans pattern. Mosquitoes adjusted to new light conditions within 24–36 hours, in which a delayed light-off resets the pattern but an early light-off does not.

Adult males begin forming top-swarms beginning at an age of 4 days and lasting until 2–3 weeks of age. These swarms form every evening and morning at a fixed location and time and last for a maximum of 30 minutes. In field observations of Ae. taeniorhynchus in Florida, morning and evening swarms were typically halfway finished by the time point of 4 minutes before and after twilight, respectively. The initial stimulus for swarming behavior is unknown, but time spent swarming depends on sensitivity of individual males to the swarming driving force and swarm size, with small swarms lasting for 12 minutes and large swarms lasting for 27 minutes. These swarms are characterized as transient passage swarms, where males participate in the swarm for 1.5 minutes at a time rather than the full-time. Despite the act of males forming top-swarms, mating has not been observed to coincide with swarming.

== Parasites ==
Parasites of this species include Amblyospora polykarya, a species of Microspora that lasts for a single generation on Ae. taeniorhynchus, and Goelomomyces psorophorae, a fungus impacting mosquito ovaries that stops egg maturity and kills all larvae.

Blood meal analysis and PCR-based parasite screening of mosquitoes in the Galapagos Islands suggested relationships between the species and Hepatozoon parasites infecting reptiles in the area. The occurrence of a mixed Hepatozoon population in the reptile host suggests that Ae. taeniorhynchus caused a breakdown of the host-species relationship between some Heptazoon parasties and native reptiles. In a topological analysis of parasitism in the food web, Ae. taeniorhynchus, along with Culex tarsalis, was found the most significant organisms within a predator-parasite sub-web, meaning they have the most food web connections among organisms mapped.

== Disease transmission ==
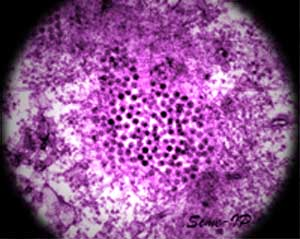
West Nile Virus

Ae. taeniorhynchus is a carrier for West Nile Virus, mosquito iridescent virus, the eastern and western type of equine encephalomyelitis, Venezuelan equine encephalomyelitis virus, and yellow fever virus. Experimental studies also established that the species is capable of mechanical transmission of Bacillus anthracis. Experimental studies regarding Rift Valley fever virus showed that infectivity is independent of temperature, but viral dissemination and transmission is faster at higher temperatures.

This species can transmit Dirofilaria immitis, a filarial worm that can cause heartworm in dogs. Infection by D. immitis occurs through parasite establishment in the Ae. taeniorhynchus Malpighian tubules in a process that changes the microvillar border to impede fluid transport. The parasite takes up to 48 hrs to establish itself in its host; establishment may not occur if the host is resistant. This parasite was also seen to spread to flightless cormorants in the Galapagos, with gene flow analysis correlating parasitic infection with Ae. taeniorhynchus migration patterns and suggesting that Ae. taeniorhynchus is the likely vector for transmission.

== Interactions with humans ==
This species of mosquito is considered a pest among humans, with Florida districts attempting to control the mosquitoes since 1927 and having spent US$1.5 million on insect control in 1951. Copper acetoarsenite, known as Paris green, is used as an insecticide for Ae. taeniorhynchus larvae at the species breeding site, since the substance acts as a toxic stomach poison. DDT, another insecticide, was also deemed to be effective against the salt marsh mosquitoes and has been used for Ae. taeniorhynchus treatment in the past. Trap-bait combinations tested against the species indicate that CDC-type traps with carbon dioxide, octenol, and heat as bait increase the trapping success of Ae. taeniorhynchus.

Humans have also tried to limit biting from Ae. taeniorhynchus because it flies very fast, and they start the blood extraction quickly, compared to the average mosquito, by wearing chemically treated protective clothing. Clothing treated with permethrin [(3-phenoxyphenyl)methyl (±) cis/trans 3-(2-dichloroethenyl)2, 2-dimethylcyclopropanecarboxylate] alongside application of deet (N,N-diethyl-m-toluamide) to the skin were shown to be extremely effective in reducing mosquito bites compared to usage of only one form of protection or no protection. The Off! Clip-on Mosquito Repellent device, which releases pyrethroid insecticide metofluthrin in vapor form, was also evaluated against Ae. taeniorhynchus in two Florida field location and was found to provide 79% protection from mosquito bites for 3 hrs.

Other toxins have been identified against Ae. taeniorhynchus. Bacillus thuringiensis var. kurstaki (HD-1) can produce a parasporal crystal in the form of a toxic inclusion body. Proteins isolated from a parasporal crystal, yielded two distinct proteins of types k-1 and k-73, of which only k-1, a 65 kD protein, was found to be toxic to Ae. taeniorhynchus larvae.

== See also ==
- List of Aedes species
