= Salt pan =

Salt pans can refer to:

- Salt pan (geology), a flat expanse of ground covered with salt and other minerals, usually found in deserts
  - Sabkha, a phonetic translation of the Arabic word for a salt pan (geology)
- Salt pannes and pools – water retaining depressions located within salt and brackish marshes
- Salt evaporation pond, a method of producing salt by evaporating brine
- Open-pan salt making, a method of salt production wherein salt is extracted from the brine using vacuum pans

== See also ==
- Dry lake
- Hypersalinity
- Salt lake
- Salt pannes and pools
