= Raymond Alexander Kelser =

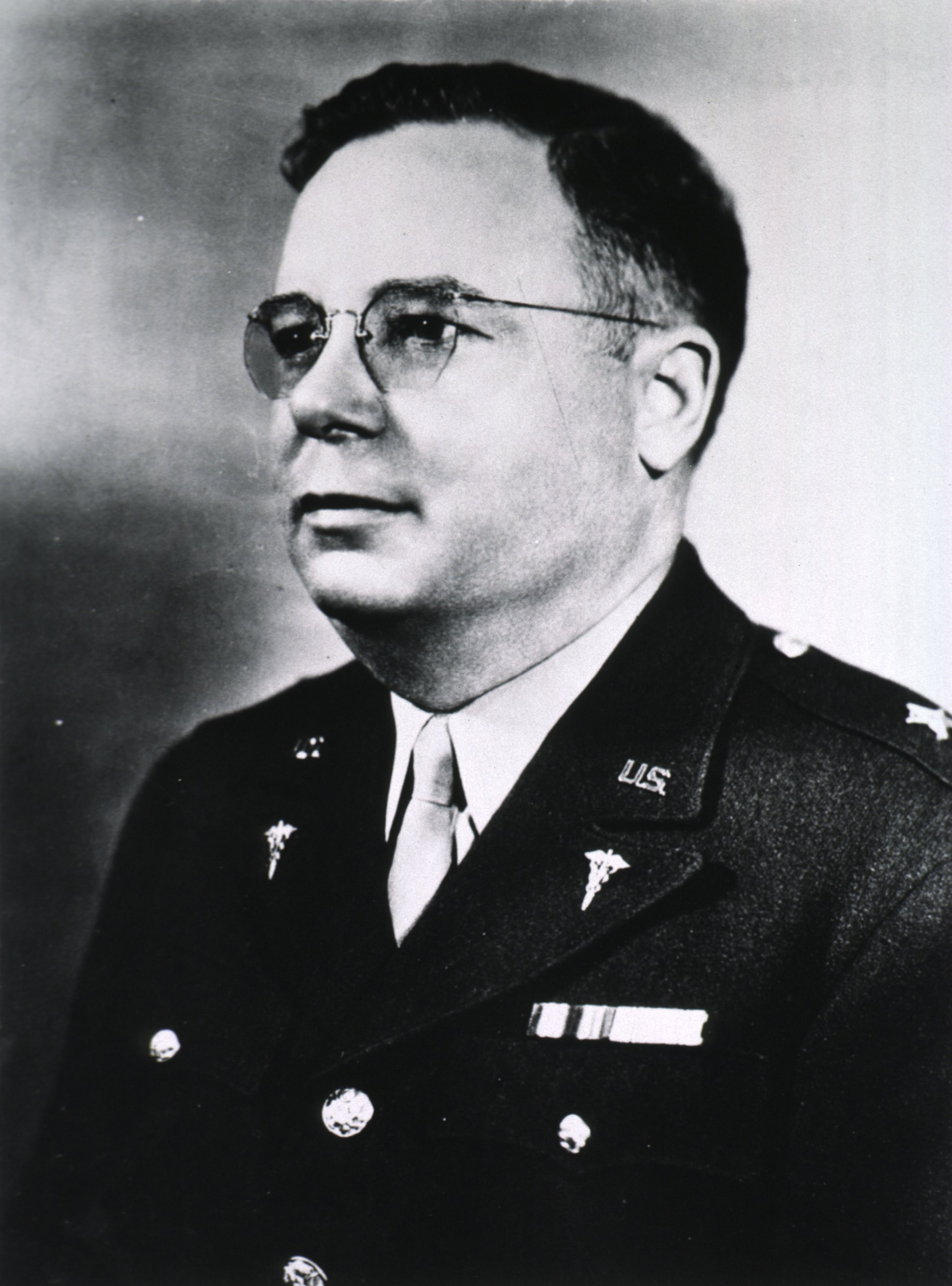

Raymond Alexander Kelser (2 December 1892 – 16 April 1952) was an American veterinary microbiologist who served in the US Army. He developed vaccines and diagnostic tests for several diseases of animals and humans. He developed a vaccine serum using chloroform-inactivated rabies virus injected into animals. He co-authored a textbook of veterinary bacteriology in 1927 which went into several editions.

== Biography ==
Kelser was born in Washington, DC, to Baltimore mechanic Charles and his wife Josie Potter. Educated in local public schools he studied business and worked as a messenger at the Bureau of Animal Industry in the US Department of Agriculture where he met John R. Mohler, chief of the pathology division who made him his secretary. He then became a laboratory assistant and then began to attend evening classes in veterinary medicine at the George Washington University and graduated in 1914. He then joined government service and was posted to the Bureau of Animal Industry to work on foot-and-mouth disease. He worked on an anthrax vaccine apart from tetanus antitoxins. In 1918 he was inducted into the Veterinary Corps as a lieutenant during World War I. After the war, he continued to work with the army at various laboratories. In 1925–28 he served in the Philippines, working on a chloroform-inactivated rinderpest vaccine. He also determined Tabanus striatus as the vector of Trypanosoma evansi. At the Army Medical School he developed a test for Clostridium botulinum toxin in canned foods. He worked in Harvard from 1933 to 1935 with Hans Zinsser. He then worked in the Panama Canal area on Chagas disease and equine encephalomyelitis. He developed a diagnostic test for Trypanosoma cruzi. When he retired in 1946 his rank was that of Brigadier General. For his work on rinderpest in the Philippines, he received a Gorgas medal in 1946. After retirement he served as a professor of bacteriology at the University of Pennsylvania apart as being dean of the veterinary school. He also served on committees dealing with rabies in the US.

Kelser married Eveline Harriet Davison in 1914 and they had a daughter.
