= Chevillon-sur-Huillard =

- Commune
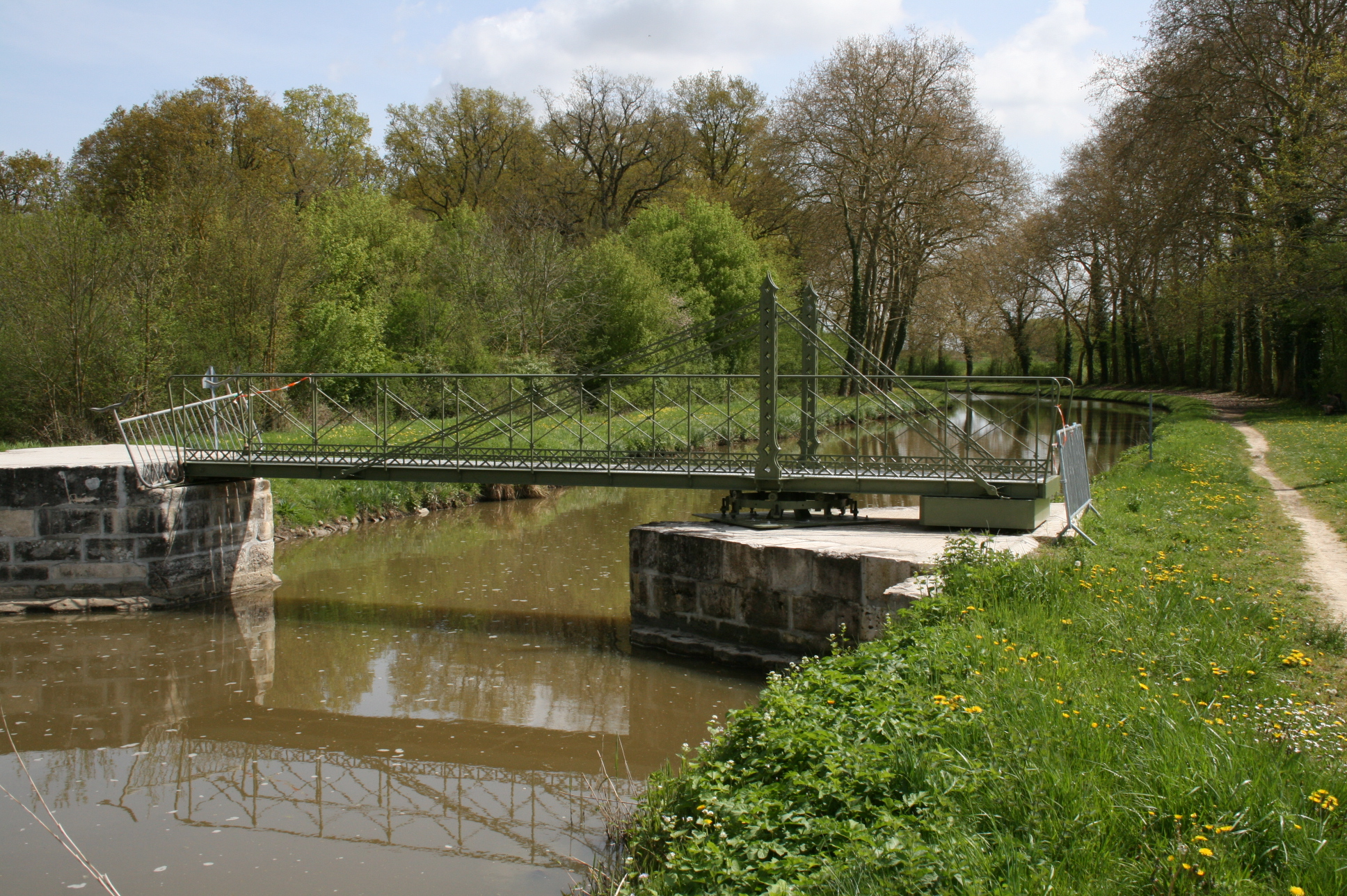
- The swing bridge at Chevillon-sur-Huillard

- Coat of arms
- Location of Chevillon-sur-Huillard
- Location within France Location within Centre-Val de Loire
- Coordinates: 47°57′47″N 2°37′34″E
- Country: France
- Region: Centre-Val de Loire
- Department: Loiret
- Arrondissement: Montargis
- Canton: Montargis
- Intercommunality: CA Montargoise et Rives du Loing

Government
  - Mayor (2020–2026): Christian Bourillon
- Area^{1}: 19.34 km^{2} (7.47 sq mi)
- Highest elevation: 106 m (348 ft)
- Lowest elevation: 86 m (282 ft)
- Population (2023): 1,506
  - Density: 77.87/km^{2} (201.7/sq mi)
- Demonym: Chevillonnois
- Time zone: UTC+01:00 (CET)
  - Summer (DST): UTC+02:00 (CEST)
- INSEE/Postal code: 45092 /45700
- ^{1} French Land Register data, which excludes lakes, ponds, glaciers > 1 km^{2} (0.386 sq mi or 247 acres) and river estuaries.

Chevillon-sur-Huillard (French pronunciation: [ʃəvijɔ̃ syʁ ɥijaʁ]) is a commune in the Loiret department in north-central France.

== See also ==
- Communes of the Loiret department
