= Villemandeur =

- Commune
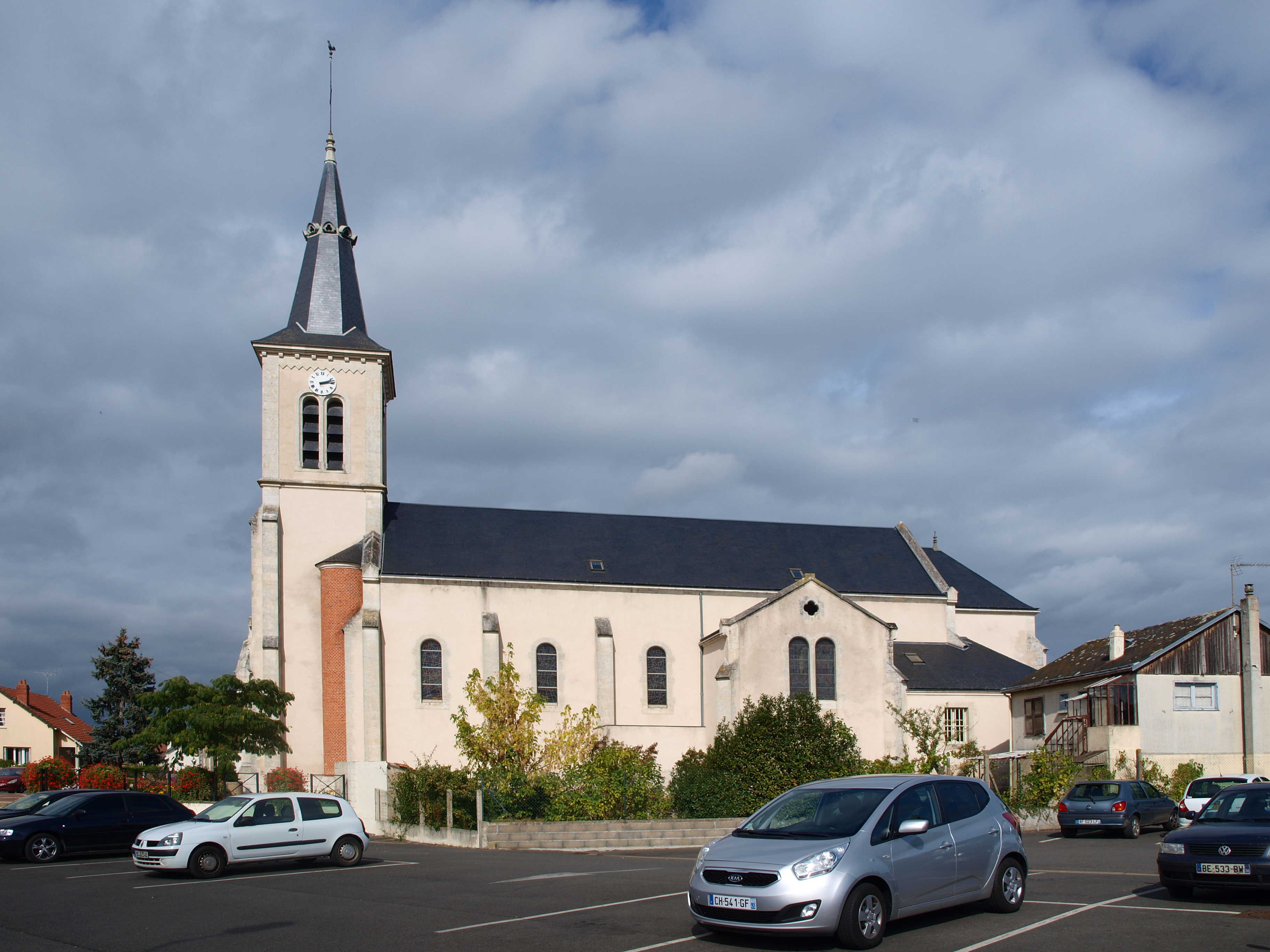
- The church in Villemandeur

- Coat of arms
- Location of Villemandeur
- Location within France Location within Centre-Val de Loire
- Coordinates: 47°59′27″N 2°42′37″E
- Country: France
- Region: Centre-Val de Loire
- Department: Loiret
- Arrondissement: Montargis
- Canton: Montargis
- Intercommunality: CA Montargoise et Rives du Loing

Government
  - Mayor (2020–2026): Denise Serrano
- Area^{1}: 11.46 km^{2} (4.42 sq mi)
- Highest elevation: 99 m (325 ft)
- Lowest elevation: 84 m (276 ft)
- Population (2023): 7,078
  - Density: 617.6/km^{2} (1,600/sq mi)
- Demonym: Mandeurais or Mandorais
- Time zone: UTC+01:00 (CET)
  - Summer (DST): UTC+02:00 (CEST)
- INSEE/Postal code: 45338 /45700
- ^{1} French Land Register data, which excludes lakes, ponds, glaciers > 1 km^{2} (0.386 sq mi or 247 acres) and river estuaries.

Villemandeur (French pronunciation: [vilmɑ̃dœʁ]) is a commune in the Loiret department in north-central France.

== Geography ==
The commune is traversed by the river Solin.

== Population ==
Historical population
Year	Pop.	±% p.a.
1968	3,078	—
1975	4,035	+3.94%
1982	4,954	+2.97%
1990	5,131	+0.44%
1999	5,650	+1.08%
2007	6,244	+1.26%
2012	6,692	+1.40%
2017	6,815	+0.36%
2023	7,078	+0.63%
Source: INSEE

== See also ==
- Communes of the Loiret department
