= Communauté d'agglomération Montargoise et Rives du Loing =

Montargoise et Rives du Loing
- Communauté d'agglomération
- Interactive map of Montargoise et Rives du Loing
- Coordinates: 47°59′N 02°43′E
- Country: France
- Region: Centre-Val de Loire
- Department: Loiret
- No. of communes: 15
- Established: 2002
- Area: 231.2 km^{2} (89.3 sq mi)
- Population (2019): 62,517
  - Density: 270.4/km^{2} (700.3/sq mi)
- Website: www.agglo-montargoise.fr

Communauté d'agglomération Montargoise et Rives du Loing is the agglomeration community, an intercommunal structure, centred on the town of Montargis. It is located in the Loiret department, in the Centre-Val de Loire region, central France. Created in 2002, its seat is in Montargis. Its area is 231.2 km^{2}. Its population was 62,517 in 2019, of which 14,976 in Montargis proper.

== Composition ==
The communauté d'agglomération consists of the following 15 communes:

1. Amilly
2. Cepoy
3. Châlette-sur-Loing
4. Chevillon-sur-Huillard
5. Conflans-sur-Loing
6. Corquilleroy
7. Lombreuil
8. Montargis
9. Mormant-sur-Vernisson
10. Pannes
11. Paucourt
12. Saint-Maurice-sur-Fessard
13. Solterre
14. Villemandeur
15. Vimory
