= Conflans-sur-Loing =

- Commune
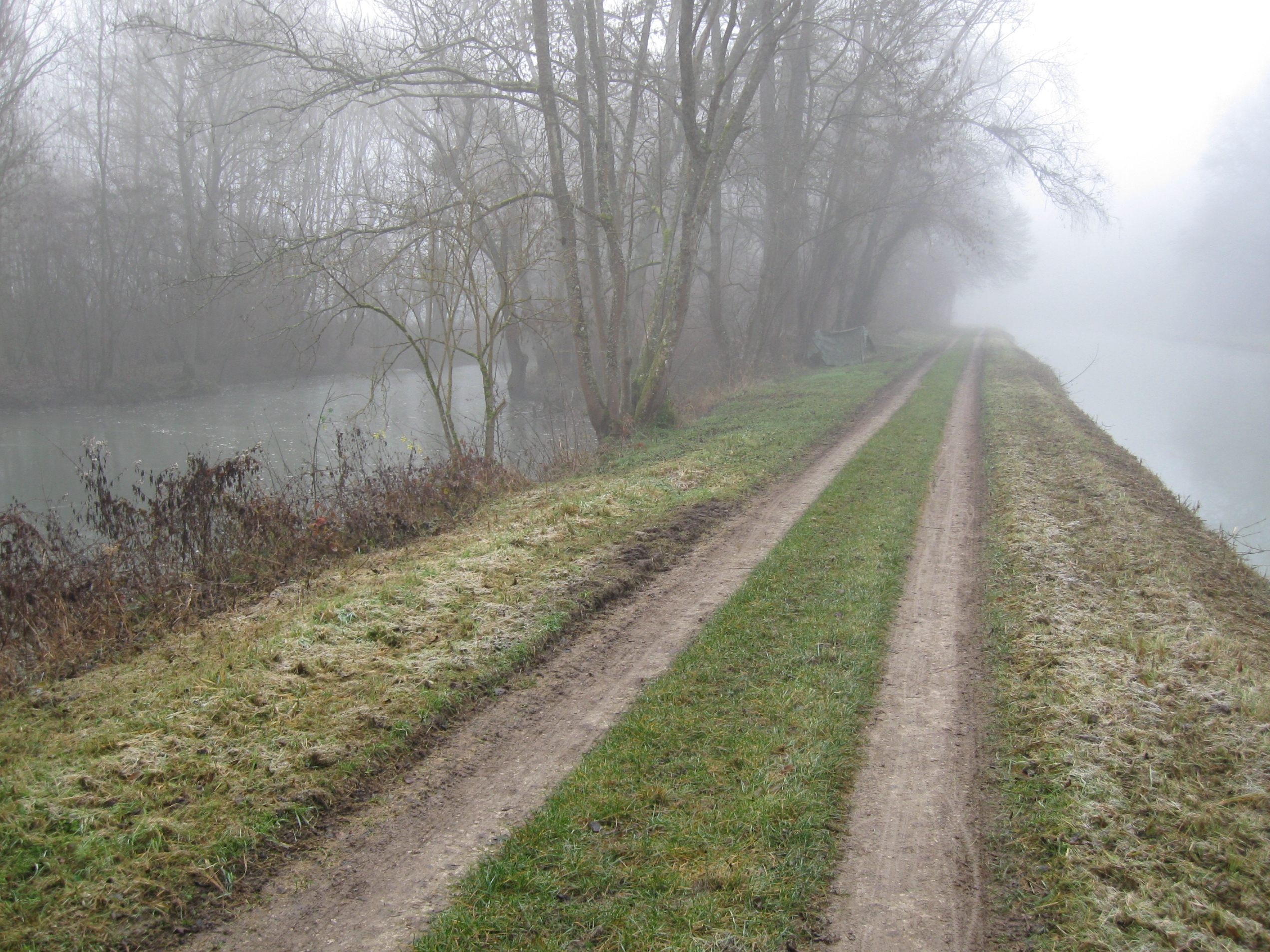
- The Loing (left) and the canal du Loing (right) at Conflans-sur-Loing

- Coat of arms
- Location of Conflans-sur-Loing
- Location within France Location within Centre-Val de Loire
- Coordinates: 47°57′11″N 2°47′24″E
- Country: France
- Region: Centre-Val de Loire
- Department: Loiret
- Arrondissement: Montargis
- Canton: Châlette-sur-Loing
- Intercommunality: CA Montargoise et Rives du Loing

Government
  - Mayor (2023–2026): Christel Oliveira
- Area^{1}: 9.14 km^{2} (3.53 sq mi)
- Highest elevation: 134 m (440 ft)
- Lowest elevation: 90 m (300 ft)
- Population (2023): 364
  - Density: 39.8/km^{2} (103/sq mi)
- Demonym: Conflanais
- Time zone: UTC+01:00 (CET)
  - Summer (DST): UTC+02:00 (CEST)
- INSEE/Postal code: 45102 /45700
- ^{1} French Land Register data, which excludes lakes, ponds, glaciers > 1 km^{2} (0.386 sq mi or 247 acres) and river estuaries.

Conflans-sur-Loing (French pronunciation: [kɔ̃flɑ̃ syʁ lwɛ̃], literally Conflans on Loing) is a commune in the Loiret department in north-central France.

== See also ==
- Communes of the Loiret department
