= Paucourt =

- Commune
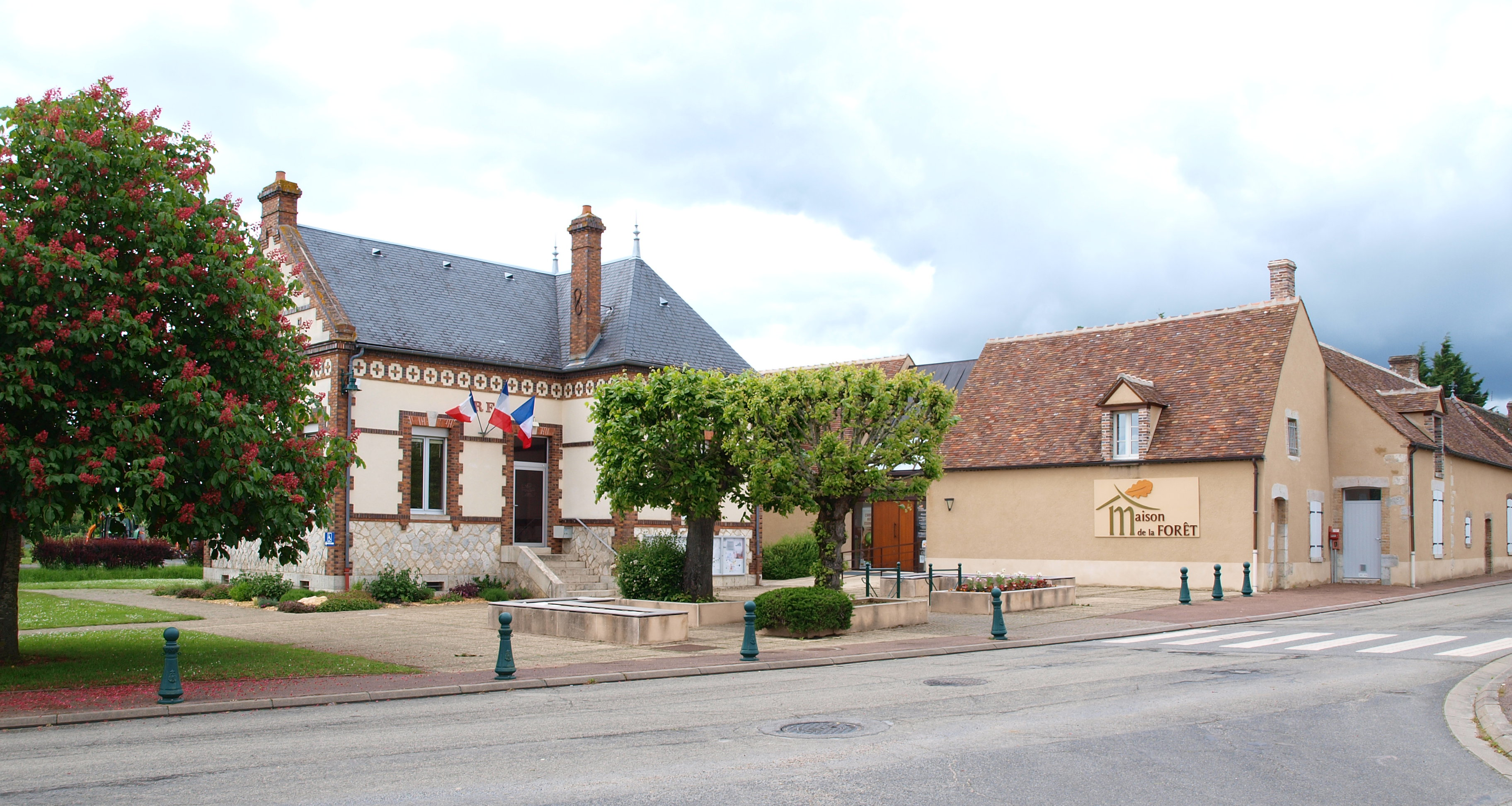
- The town hall in Paucourt
- Location of Paucourt
- Location within France Location within Centre-Val de Loire
- Coordinates: 48°02′10″N 2°47′42″E
- Country: France
- Region: Centre-Val de Loire
- Department: Loiret
- Arrondissement: Montargis
- Canton: Châlette-sur-Loing
- Intercommunality: CA Montargoise et Rives du Loing

Government
  - Mayor (2020–2026): Gérard Lorentz
- Area^{1}: 20.2 km^{2} (7.8 sq mi)
- Highest elevation: 127 m (417 ft)
- Lowest elevation: 82 m (269 ft)
- Population (2023): 927
  - Density: 45.9/km^{2} (119/sq mi)
- Time zone: UTC+01:00 (CET)
  - Summer (DST): UTC+02:00 (CEST)
- INSEE/Postal code: 45249 /45200
- ^{1} French Land Register data, which excludes lakes, ponds, glaciers > 1 km^{2} (0.386 sq mi or 247 acres) and river estuaries.

Paucourt (French pronunciation: [pokuʁ]) is a commune in the Loiret department in north-central France.

== See also ==
- Communes of the Loiret department
