= Vimory =

- Commune
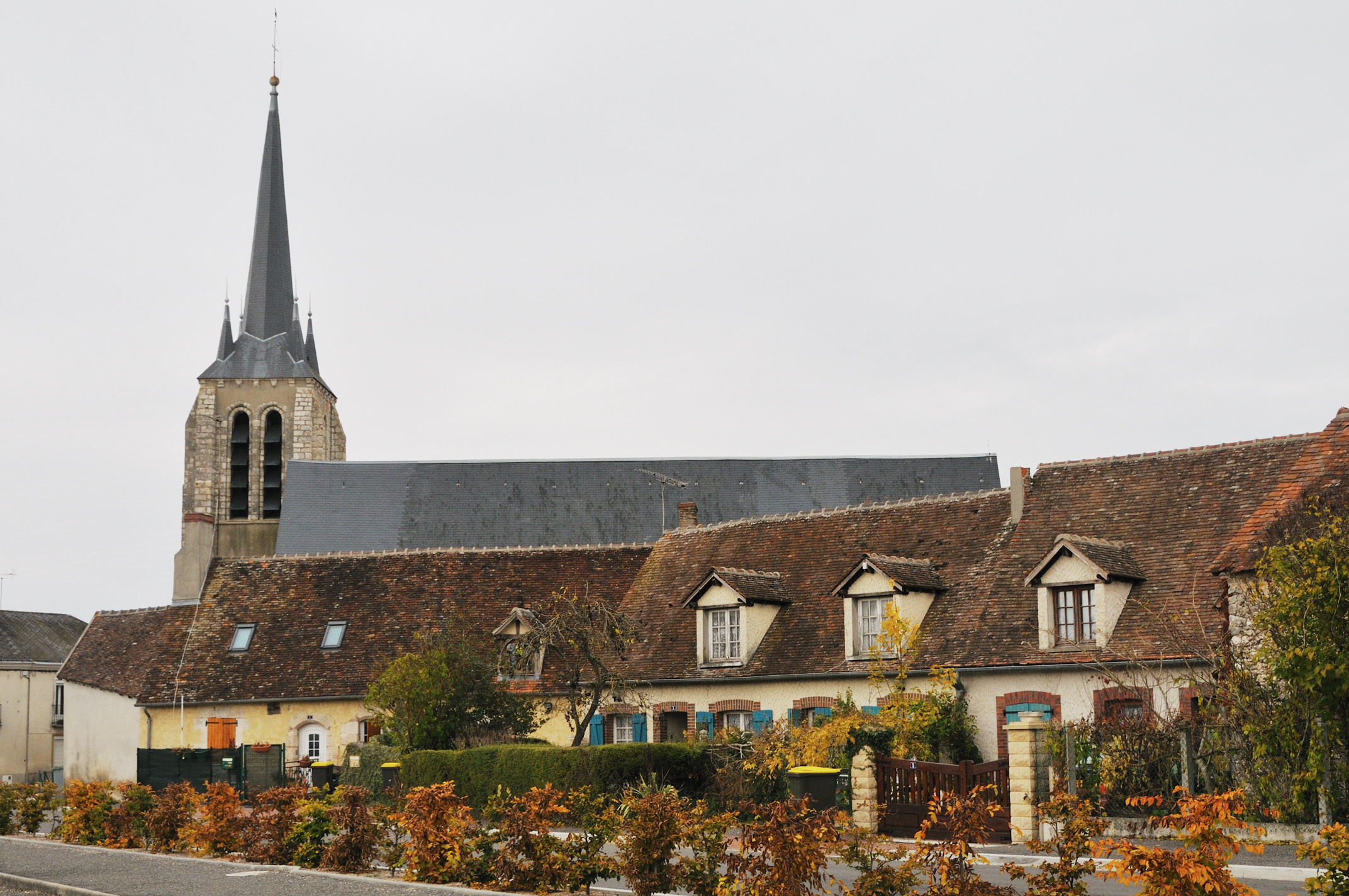
- The church in Vimory
- Location of Vimory
- Location within France Location within Centre-Val de Loire
- Coordinates: 47°56′53″N 2°41′18″E
- Country: France
- Region: Centre-Val de Loire
- Department: Loiret
- Arrondissement: Montargis
- Canton: Montargis
- Intercommunality: CA Montargoise et Rives du Loing

Government
  - Mayor (2020–2026): Valérie Bascop
- Area^{1}: 26.22 km^{2} (10.12 sq mi)
- Highest elevation: 104 m (341 ft)
- Lowest elevation: 89 m (292 ft)
- Population (2023): 1,099
  - Density: 41.91/km^{2} (108.6/sq mi)
- Time zone: UTC+01:00 (CET)
  - Summer (DST): UTC+02:00 (CEST)
- INSEE/Postal code: 45345 /45700
- ^{1} French Land Register data, which excludes lakes, ponds, glaciers > 1 km^{2} (0.386 sq mi or 247 acres) and river estuaries.

Vimory (French pronunciation: [vimɔʁi]) is a commune in the Loiret department in north-central France.

== Geography ==
The commune is traversed by the river Solin.

== See also ==
- Communes of the Loiret department
