= Saint-Maurice-sur-Fessard =

- Commune
- Coat of arms
- Location of Saint-Maurice-sur-Fessard
- Location within France Location within Centre-Val de Loire
- Coordinates: 47°59′35″N 2°37′16″E
- Country: France
- Region: Centre-Val de Loire
- Department: Loiret
- Arrondissement: Montargis
- Canton: Montargis
- Intercommunality: CA Montargoise et Rives du Loing

Government
  - Mayor (2020–2026): Gérard Lelièvre
- Area^{1}: 15.38 km^{2} (5.94 sq mi)
- Elevation: 92 m (302 ft)
- Highest elevation: 117 m (384 ft)
- Lowest elevation: 84 m (276 ft)
- Population (2023): 1,161
  - Density: 75.49/km^{2} (195.5/sq mi)
- Demonym(s): Saint-Mauriciens, Saint-Mauriciennes
- Time zone: UTC+01:00 (CET)
  - Summer (DST): UTC+02:00 (CEST)
- INSEE/Postal code: 45293 /45700
- ^{1} French Land Register data, which excludes lakes, ponds, glaciers > 1 km^{2} (0.386 sq mi or 247 acres) and river estuaries.

Saint-Maurice-sur-Fessard (French pronunciation: [sɛ̃ mɔʁis syʁ fɛsaʁ]) is a commune in the Loiret department in north-central France.

== Population ==
Historical population
Year	Pop.	±% p.a.
1968	702	—
1975	689	−0.27%
1982	772	+1.64%
1990	784	+0.19%
1999	887	+1.38%
2007	1,103	+2.76%
2012	1,188	+1.50%
2017	1,183	−0.08%
2023	1,161	−0.31%
Source: INSEE

== See also ==
- Communes of the Loiret department
