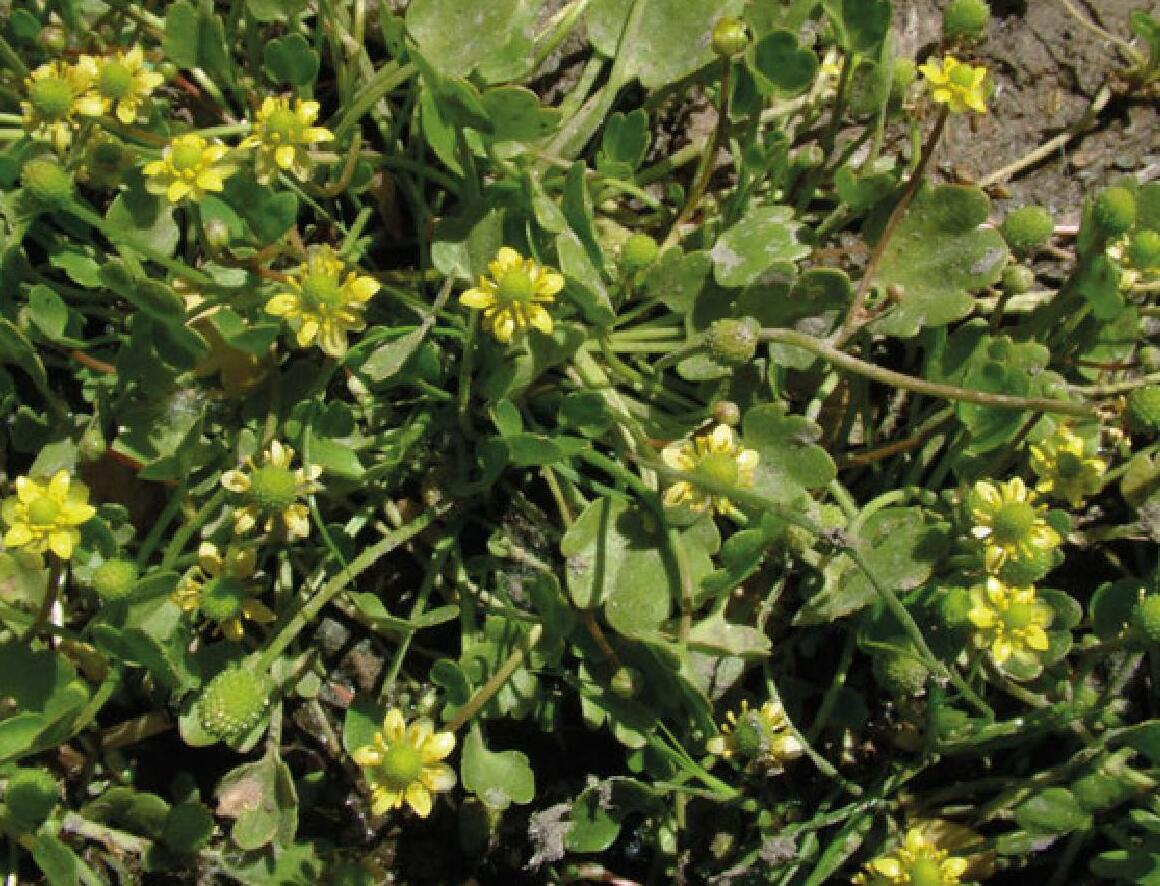
- Halerpestes sarmentosa

Scientific classification
- Kingdom: Plantae
- Clade: Tracheophytes
- Clade: Angiosperms
- Clade: Eudicots
- Order: Ranunculales
- Family: Ranunculaceae
- Subfamily: Ranunculoideae
- Tribe: Ranunculeae
- Genus: Halerpestes; Greene

= Halerpestes =

Genus of plants

Halerpestes is a genus of flowering plants belonging to the family Ranunculaceae.

Its native range is Europe, Tropical Asia, South America, North America and Temperate Asia.

Species:

- Halerpestes cymbalaria (Pursh) Greene
- Halerpestes exilis (Phil.) M.N.Tamura
- Halerpestes filisecta L.Liou
- Halerpestes kawakamii (Makino) Tamura
- Halerpestes lancifolia (Bertol.) Hand.-Mazz.
- Halerpestes ruthenica (Jacq.) Ovcz.
- Halerpestes sarmentosa (Adams) Kom.
- Halerpestes tricuspis (Maxim.) Hand.-Mazz.
- Halerpestes uniflora (Phil. ex Reiche) Emadzade, Lehnebach, P.J.Lockh. & Hörandl
