= Mormant-sur-Vernisson =

- Commune
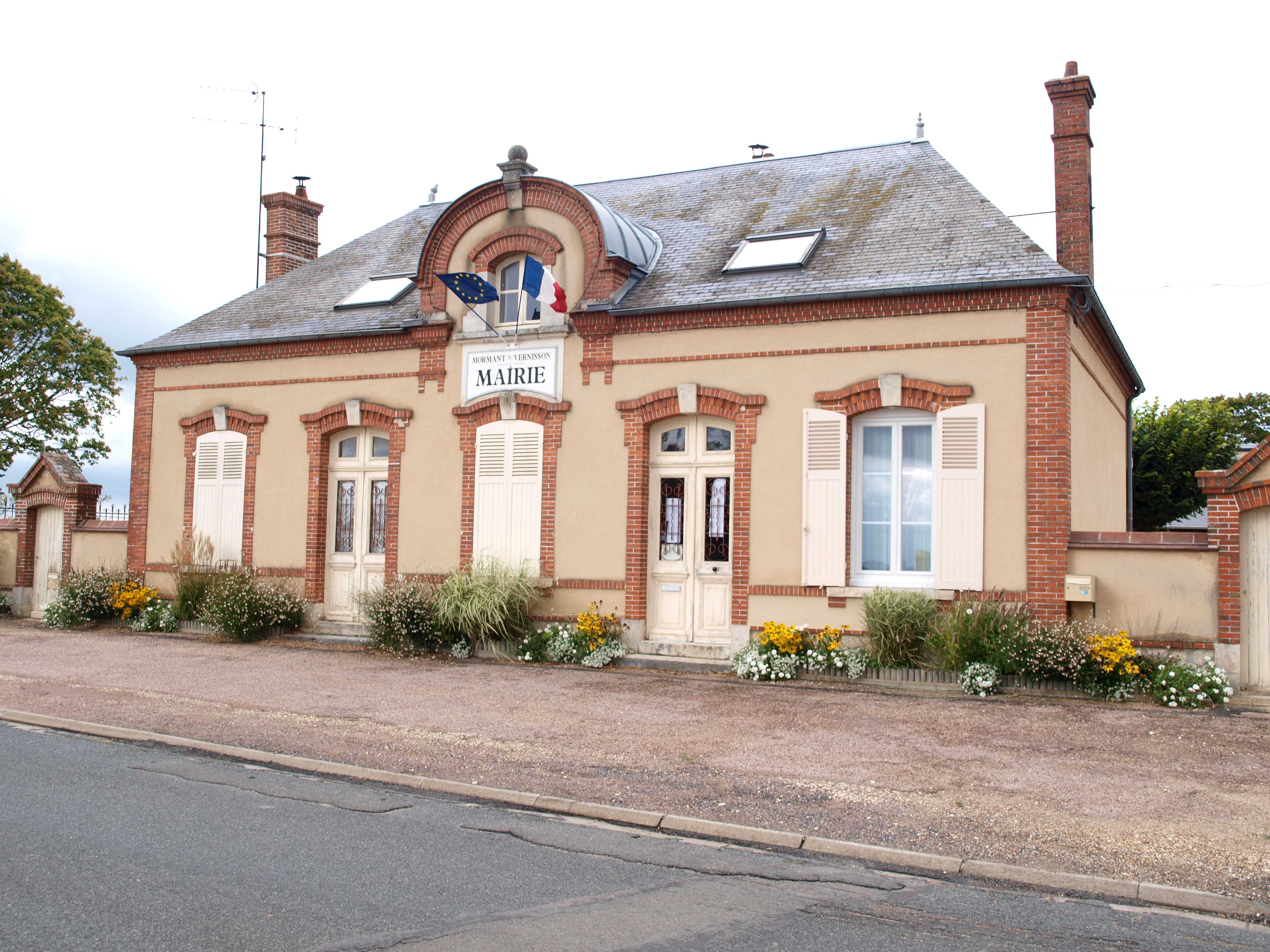
- The town hall in Mormant-sur-Vernisson
- Location of Mormant-sur-Vernisson
- Location within France Location within Centre-Val de Loire
- Coordinates: 47°56′53″N 2°44′18″E
- Country: France
- Region: Centre-Val de Loire
- Department: Loiret
- Arrondissement: Montargis
- Canton: Montargis
- Intercommunality: CA Montargoise et Rives du Loing

Government
  - Mayor (2020–2026): Vincent Desrumaux
- Area^{1}: 10.92 km^{2} (4.22 sq mi)
- Highest elevation: 107 m (351 ft)
- Lowest elevation: 89 m (292 ft)
- Population (2023): 138
  - Density: 12.6/km^{2} (32.7/sq mi)
- Time zone: UTC+01:00 (CET)
  - Summer (DST): UTC+02:00 (CEST)
- INSEE/Postal code: 45216 /45700
- ^{1} French Land Register data, which excludes lakes, ponds, glaciers > 1 km^{2} (0.386 sq mi or 247 acres) and river estuaries.

Mormant-sur-Vernisson (French pronunciation: [mɔʁmɑ̃ syʁ vɛʁnisɔ̃]) is a commune in the Loiret department in north-central France.

== See also ==
- Communes of the Loiret department
