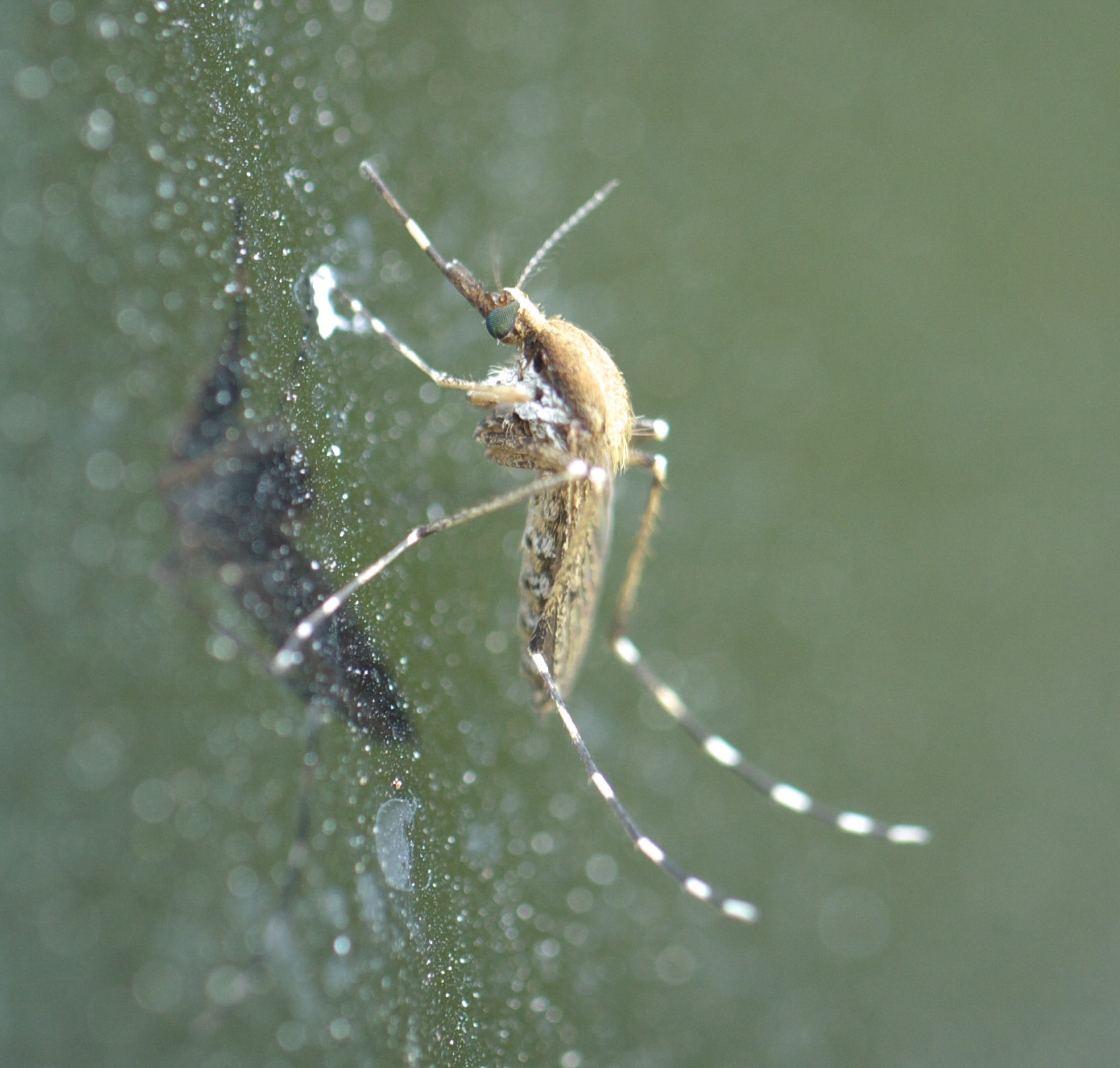

Scientific classification
- Kingdom: Animalia
- Phylum: Arthropoda
- Class: Insecta
- Order: Diptera
- Family: Culicidae
- Genus: Aedes
- Subgenus: Ochlerotatus
- Species: A. sollicitans

Binomial name
- Aedes sollicitans (Walker, 1856)

Synonyms
- Ochlerotatus sollicitans (Walker, 1856); Culex sollicitans Walker, 1856

= Aedes sollicitans =

Species of mosquito

Aedes sollicitans, the eastern saltmarsh mosquito (also known as Ochlerotatus sollicitans), is a species of mosquito native to the eastern seaboard of the United States and Canada as well as the entire Gulf coast and is also present in the Bahamas and Greater Antilles. While primarily found in coastal areas within a few miles of the coast, it is occasionally found inland in areas with saline pools, the species was reported as far west as Arizona. The species is a prime vector for Eastern equine encephalitis, Venezuelan equine encephalitis and dog heartworm.

== Description ==
Aedes sollicitans has a conspicuous band of white scales around the central area of the proboscis and the anterior portion of the hind tarsomeres upon which there is also band a band of yellow scales in the middle. The abdomen has white basal bands and is divided by a medial longitudinal stripe. The thorax is white on the sides and the top is brown, yellow, golden and white.

=== Similar species ===
Aedes sollicitans resembles Aedes taeniorhynchus but the two species can be distinguished at the larval and adult stages. Larval A. sollicitans have longer breathing tubes, have scale patches with pointed tips, and larger spines that line the edges of each scale patch. Adult A. sollicitans are golden brown while adult Aedes taeniorhychus are black and smaller in size.

== Habitat ==
Aedes sollicitans tends to stay within 5 miles of the coast on average all the range can be greater dependent upon a number of factors such as wind speed and duration.

== Food resources ==
It tends to feed most actively at twilight but is an opportunistic feeder which will feed a host species that enters its area in daytime. The female requires one blood meal for each egg batch with the primary host species being mammals, and birds as a secondary host.

== Oviposition ==
The female Aedes sollicitans lays her eggs on the dried out substrate of salt pannes, depressions within salt marshes which dry out between periods of very high tide (spring tide). The eggs hatch upon the panne filling at the next spring tide in 4–5 days with optimal conditions.

In the south the peak amount of adults occurs in the spring and fall, and in the northern portion of its range peak adult population occurs in the summer. The last batches of eggs laid in the fall remain in diapause until the spring.
