= Solterre =

- Commune
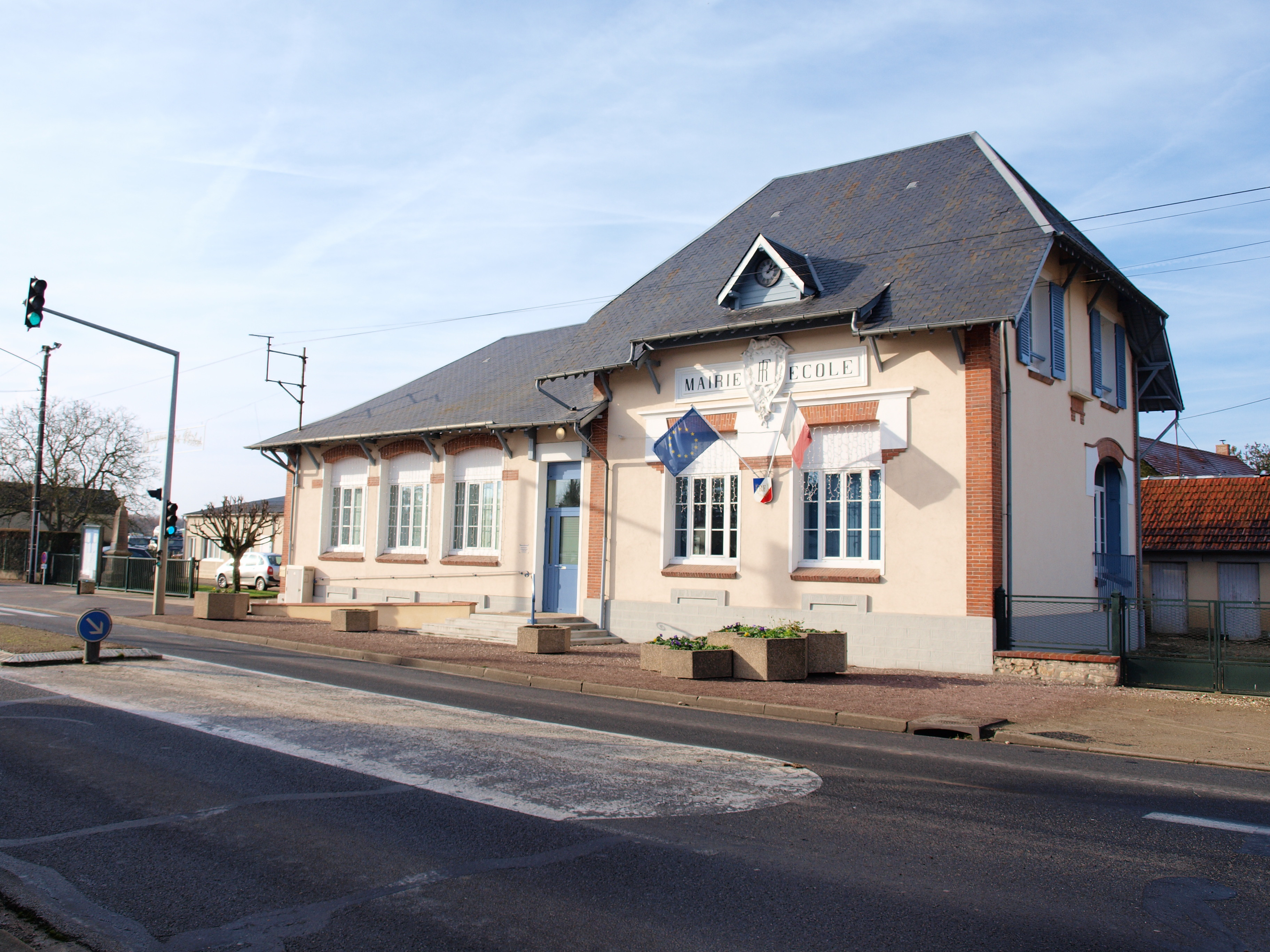
- The town hall in Solterre
- Location of Solterre
- Location within France Location within Centre-Val de Loire
- Coordinates: 47°55′12″N 2°44′20″E
- Country: France
- Region: Centre-Val de Loire
- Department: Loiret
- Arrondissement: Montargis
- Canton: Montargis
- Intercommunality: CA Montargoise et Rives du Loing

Government
  - Mayor (2020–2026): Jean-Paul Billault
- Area^{1}: 9.80 km^{2} (3.78 sq mi)
- Highest elevation: 115 m (377 ft)
- Lowest elevation: 96 m (315 ft)
- Population (2023): 466
  - Density: 47.6/km^{2} (123/sq mi)
- Time zone: UTC+01:00 (CET)
  - Summer (DST): UTC+02:00 (CEST)
- INSEE/Postal code: 45312 /45700
- ^{1} French Land Register data, which excludes lakes, ponds, glaciers > 1 km^{2} (0.386 sq mi or 247 acres) and river estuaries.

Solterre (French pronunciation: [sɔltɛʁ]) is a commune in the Loiret department in north-central France.

== See also ==
- Communes of the Loiret department
