= Lombreuil =

- Commune
- Location of Lombreuil
- Location within France Location within Centre-Val de Loire
- Coordinates: 47°56′29″N 2°37′55″E
- Country: France
- Region: Centre-Val de Loire
- Department: Loiret
- Arrondissement: Montargis
- Canton: Montargis
- Intercommunality: CA Montargoise et Rives du Loing

Government
  - Mayor (2020–2026): Eric Godey
- Area^{1}: 7.56 km^{2} (2.92 sq mi)
- Highest elevation: 107 m (351 ft)
- Lowest elevation: 94 m (308 ft)
- Population (2023): 307
  - Density: 40.6/km^{2} (105/sq mi)
- Time zone: UTC+01:00 (CET)
  - Summer (DST): UTC+02:00 (CEST)
- INSEE/Postal code: 45185 /45700
- ^{1} French Land Register data, which excludes lakes, ponds, glaciers > 1 km^{2} (0.386 sq mi or 247 acres) and river estuaries.

Lombreuil (French pronunciation: [lɔ̃bʁœj]) is a commune in the Loiret department in north-central France.

== See also ==
- Communes of the Loiret department
