= Salt pannes and pools =

Water retaining depressions located within salt and brackish marshes

A diagram of a salt marsh at low tide, with salt pannes and pools visible. Open with the play button then scroll to change the tide.

Salt pannes and pools are water retaining depressions located within salt and brackish marshes. Pools tend to retain water during the summer months between high tides, whereas pannes generally do not. Salt pannes generally start when a mat of organic debris (known as wrack) is deposited upon existing vegetation, killing it. This creates a slight depression in the surrounding vegetation which retains water for varying periods of time. Upon successive cycles of inundation and evaporation the panne develops an increased salinity greater than that of the larger body of water. This increased salinity dictates the type of flora and fauna able to grow within the panne. Salt pools are also secondary formations, though the exact mechanism(s) of formation are not well understood; some have predicted they will increase in size and abundance in the future due to rising sea levels.

Salt pannes and pools are unique microhabitats dominated by various species of halophytes, benthic plants and varying estuarine marine life that varies considerably in composition due to a variety of factors:

- Substrate type: affects the ability of the depression to hold water.
- Depth and diameter: affect water temperature and evaporation rate in the depression. A shallow and wide pool will evaporate at a greater rate than a pool of the same volume of water which is deeper and has a smaller surface area. Evaporation rate also affects salinity, the higher the evaporation rate the higher the salinity, with rates as high as a third greater than ocean water.
- Location within the intertidal zone, whether high marsh or low marsh and distance from the mean low tide mark which affects the length and duration of inundation until the depression is subject to evaporation as well as length of time until the rising tide replenishes the water volume.

These factors affect the types of species which can survive within the various types of salt pannes and pools.

Variants of salt pannes and pools:

Low salt marsh

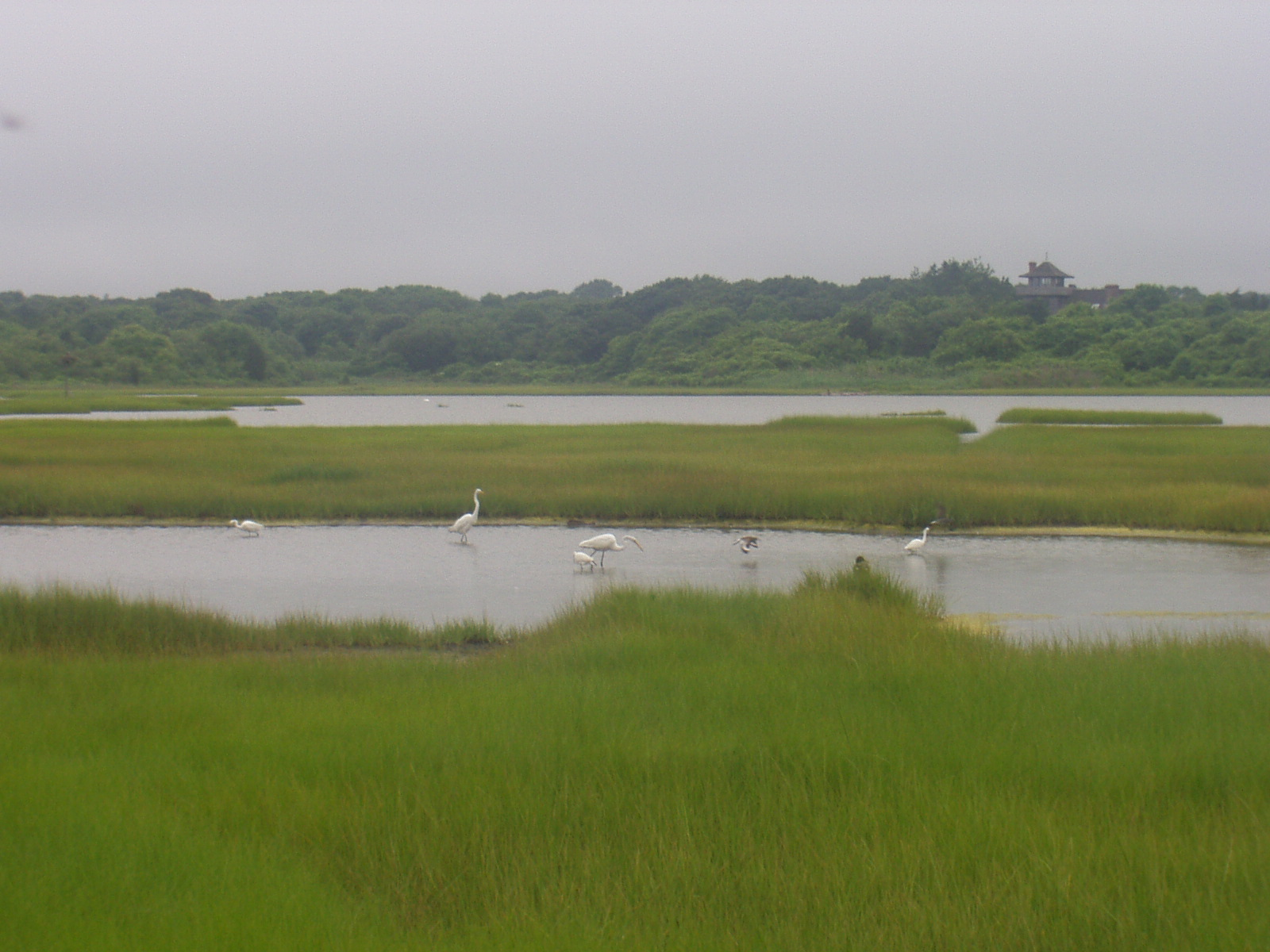
Salt marsh showing smooth cordgrass Spartina alterniflora, a dominant species of halophyte in the intertidal zone, and egrets feeding in a tidal pool.

- Low salt marsh panne

Usually devoid of vegetation, that may be present include smooth cordgrass (Spartina alterniflora), marine algae such as knotted wrack (Ascophyllum nodosum) and rockweeds (Fucus spp.). The substrate is typically soft, silty mud.

High salt marsh

- Arrow-grass (forb) panne

Briefly flooded, very shallow with a moderate amount of vegetation usually dominated by arrow-grass (Triglochin maritimum), with the deeper sections possibly remaining unvegetated.

- Smooth cord-grass (short form) panne

Shallow anaerobic depressions with poor drainage, poor water quality due to low nutrient levels and high concentrations of sulfides and similar compounds which inhibit plant growth. Short form (6-12" tall) smooth cord-grass (Spartina alterniflora) is the dominant plant species. Typically found on the high salt marsh, but can occasionally be found on the upper margins of low salt marsh.

Salt marsh mosquito panne

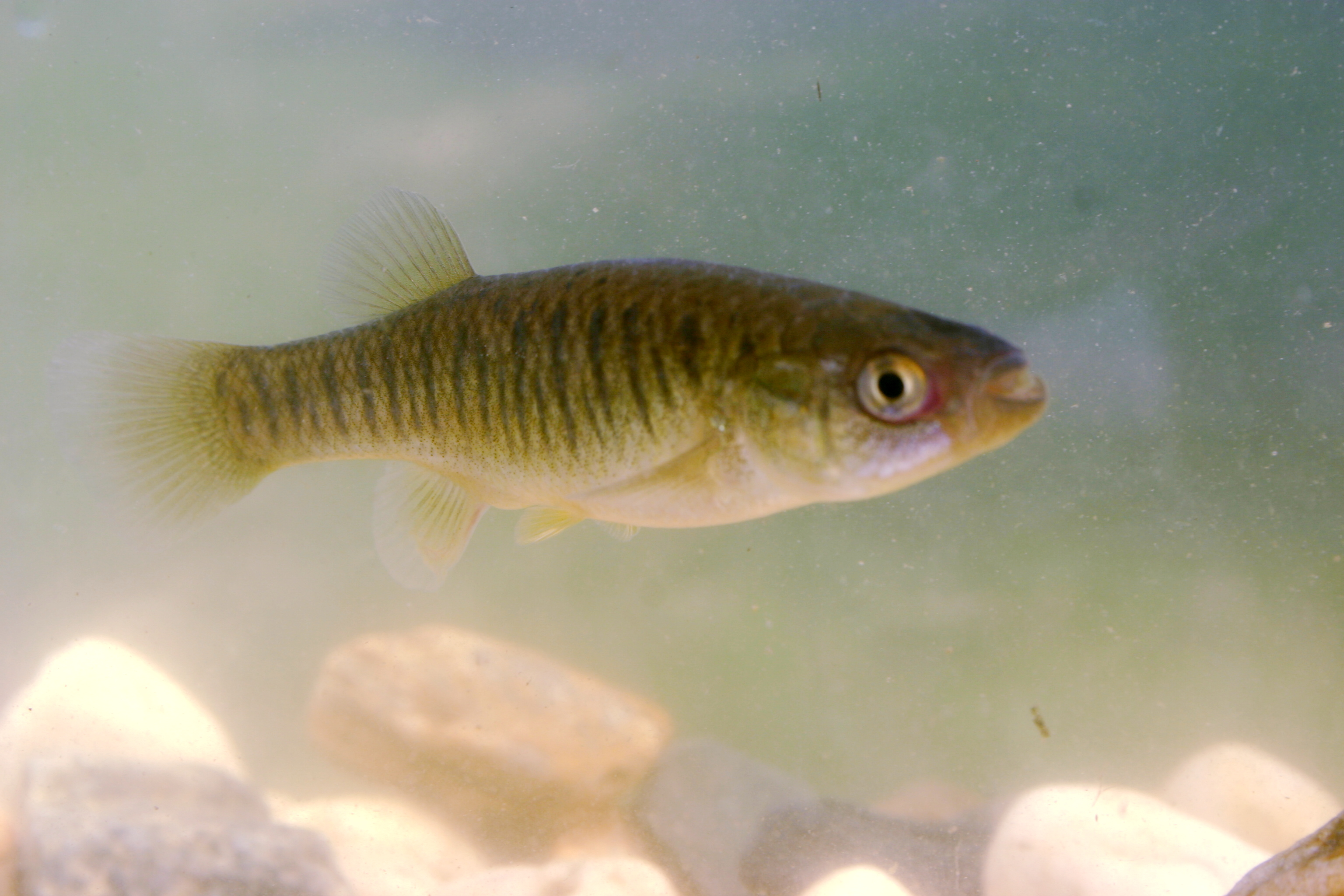
Mummichogs, (Fundulus heteroclitus), found in deepwater pools

Minimal vegetation often found on the upper half of the high salt marsh. It is typically deeper than forb and smooth cord-grass pannes. Usually flooded by the higher of the two spring tides, retains water for 2–3 weeks later until drying out. The female eastern salt marsh mosquito (Aedes sollicitans) lays eggs on the exposed surface. The eggs lay dormant until the next time the panne floods.

Widgeon grass (Ruppia maritima) - marsh minnow deepwater pool. Pools on the high salt marsh that are semi-permanently and permanently flooded. They are able to sustain populations of sheephead minnow (Cyprinodon variegatus variegatus), mummichog (Fundulus heteroclitus) and other species of small fish which may become trapped in the pools and benthic species of vegetation. Occasionally can be found at the upper edge of the low salt marsh.

== Brackish water marsh ==
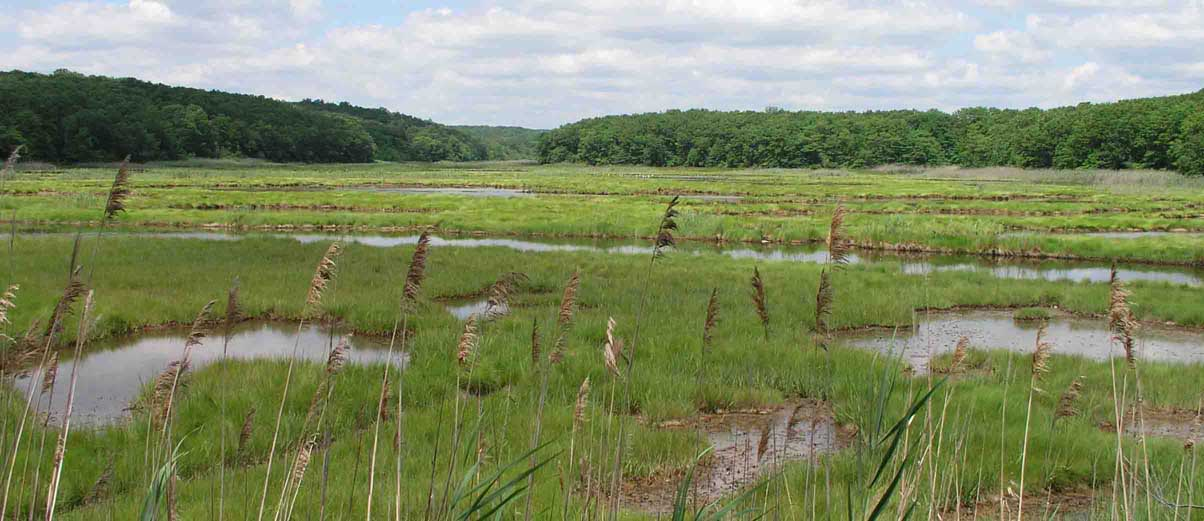
Salt marsh showing salt pannes and ponds, spartina alternifolia and invasive phragmites communis in foreground.

Brackish marsh panne variants occur in brackish marshes (short graminoid variant), one of the native dominant species is spike grass (Distichlis spicata), some brackish marsh pannes are dominated by the narrow-leaved cattail (Typha angustifolia) an invasive exotic species.

- Mixed graminoid - forb panne

Shallow depressions flooded for only for a brief time and are characterized by a variable mix of graminoids and forbs. Frequent herbs include three-square rush (Scirpus pungens), stout bulrush (S. robustus), arrow-grass, marsh creeping bent-grass (Agrostis stolonifera), salt-loving spike-rush (Eleocharis halophila). Growing with less frequency are red fescue (Festuca rubra), New York aster (Symphyotrichum novi-belgii) silverweed, saltmeadow cordgrass (Spartina patens), and salt marsh rush.

- Sparsely vegetated panne

Saturated, mud dominated pannes are occasionally found in the transition zone next to forested uplands where they are shaded by overhanging tree branches thus inhibiting evaporation. This is the preferred habitat for the uncommon seaside crowfoot (Ranunculus cymbalaria), where prostrate colonies may form small patches over the soil surface. Other graminoids and forbs scattered across the mud, or more often around the panne edge, include Virginia wild rye (Elymus virginicus), chaffy salt sedge (Carex paleacea) seaside goldenrod (Solidago sempervirens), marsh creeping bent grass, New York aster and smooth cordgrass.
