= Elser =

Elser is a German surname. Notable people with the surname include:

- Johann Georg Elser (1903–1945), attempted to assassinate Adolf Hitler
  - 13 Minutes (2015 film), a German film about Johann Georg Elser, also titled Elser
- Konrad Elser, German pianist
- Marianne Elser Crowder (1906–2010), American girl-scout leader
