= Amilly, Loiret =

Amilly
- Commune
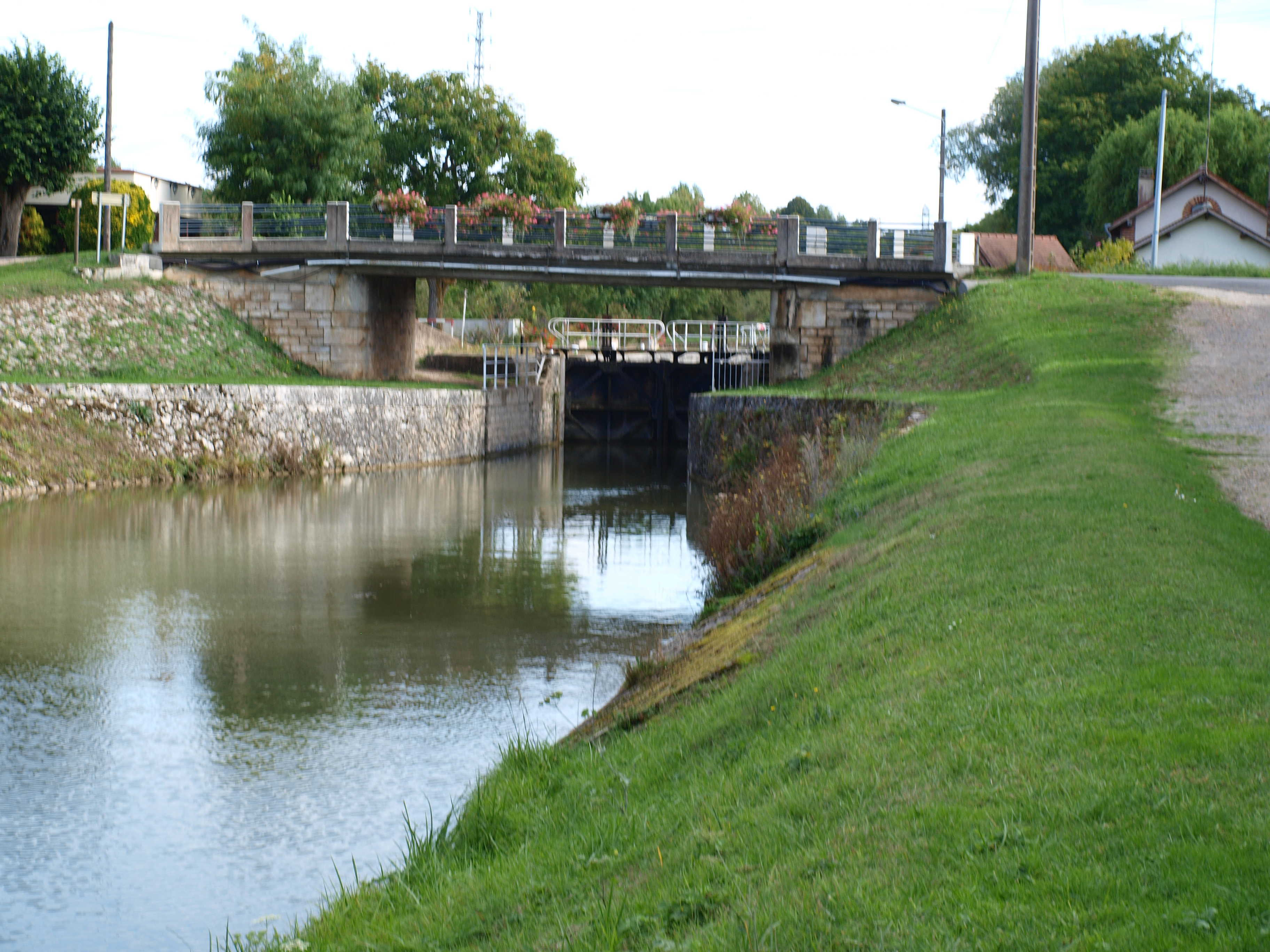
- The Briare Canal at Amilly

- Coat of arms
- Location of Amilly
- Location within France Location within Centre-Val de Loire
- Coordinates: 47°58′27″N 2°46′15″E
- Country: France
- Region: Centre-Val de Loire
- Department: Loiret
- Arrondissement: Montargis
- Canton: Châlette-sur-Loing
- Intercommunality: CA Montargoise et Rives du Loing

Government
  - Mayor (2020–2026): Gérard Dupaty
- Area^{1}: 40.26 km^{2} (15.54 sq mi)
- Highest elevation: 139 m (456 ft)
- Lowest elevation: 86 m (282 ft)
- Population (2023): 13,582
  - Density: 337.4/km^{2} (873.8/sq mi)
- Time zone: UTC+01:00 (CET)
  - Summer (DST): UTC+02:00 (CEST)
- INSEE/Postal code: 45004 /45200
- ^{1} French Land Register data, which excludes lakes, ponds, glaciers > 1 km^{2} (0.386 sq mi or 247 acres) and river estuaries.

Amilly (French pronunciation: [amiji] or [amili]) is a commune and town in the Loiret department in north-central France.

== Population ==
Historical population

| Year | Pop. | ±% p.a. |
|---|---|---|
| 1793 | 1,246 | — |
| 1800 | 1,474 | +2.43% |
| 1806 | 1,424 | −0.57% |
| 1821 | 1,441 | +0.08% |
| 1831 | 1,618 | +1.17% |
| 1836 | 1,675 | +0.69% |
| 1841 | 1,670 | −0.06% |
| 1846 | 1,824 | +1.78% |
| 1851 | 2,013 | +1.99% |
| 1856 | 2,162 | +1.44% |
| 1861 | 2,263 | +0.92% |
| 1866 | 2,093 | −1.55% |
| 1872 | 2,304 | +1.61% |
| 1876 | 2,429 | +1.33% |
| 1881 | 2,555 | +1.02% |
| 1886 | 2,594 | +0.30% |
| 1891 | 2,374 | −1.76% |
| 1896 | 2,220 | −1.33% |
| 1901 | 2,215 | −0.05% |

| Year | Pop. | ±% p.a. |
|---|---|---|
| 1906 | 2,235 | +0.18% |
| 1911 | 2,203 | −0.29% |
| 1921 | 2,200 | −0.01% |
| 1926 | 2,504 | +2.62% |
| 1931 | 2,934 | +3.22% |
| 1936 | 3,317 | +2.48% |
| 1946 | 3,828 | +1.44% |
| 1954 | 4,213 | +1.21% |
| 1962 | 5,468 | +3.31% |
| 1968 | 6,705 | +3.46% |
| 1975 | 8,373 | +3.22% |
| 1982 | 9,478 | +1.79% |
| 1990 | 11,029 | +1.91% |
| 1999 | 11,497 | +0.46% |
| 2007 | 11,635 | +0.15% |
| 2012 | 11,785 | +0.26% |
| 2017 | 12,977 | +1.95% |
| 2023 | 13,582 | +0.76% |

Source: EHESS and INSEE (1968-2023)

== Sights ==
- Church of St. Martin (16th century)
- Castles of Varenne (16th century) and of the Bourgoins (18th century)
- Bardin Watermill
- Museum of Folk Art

== Twin towns ==
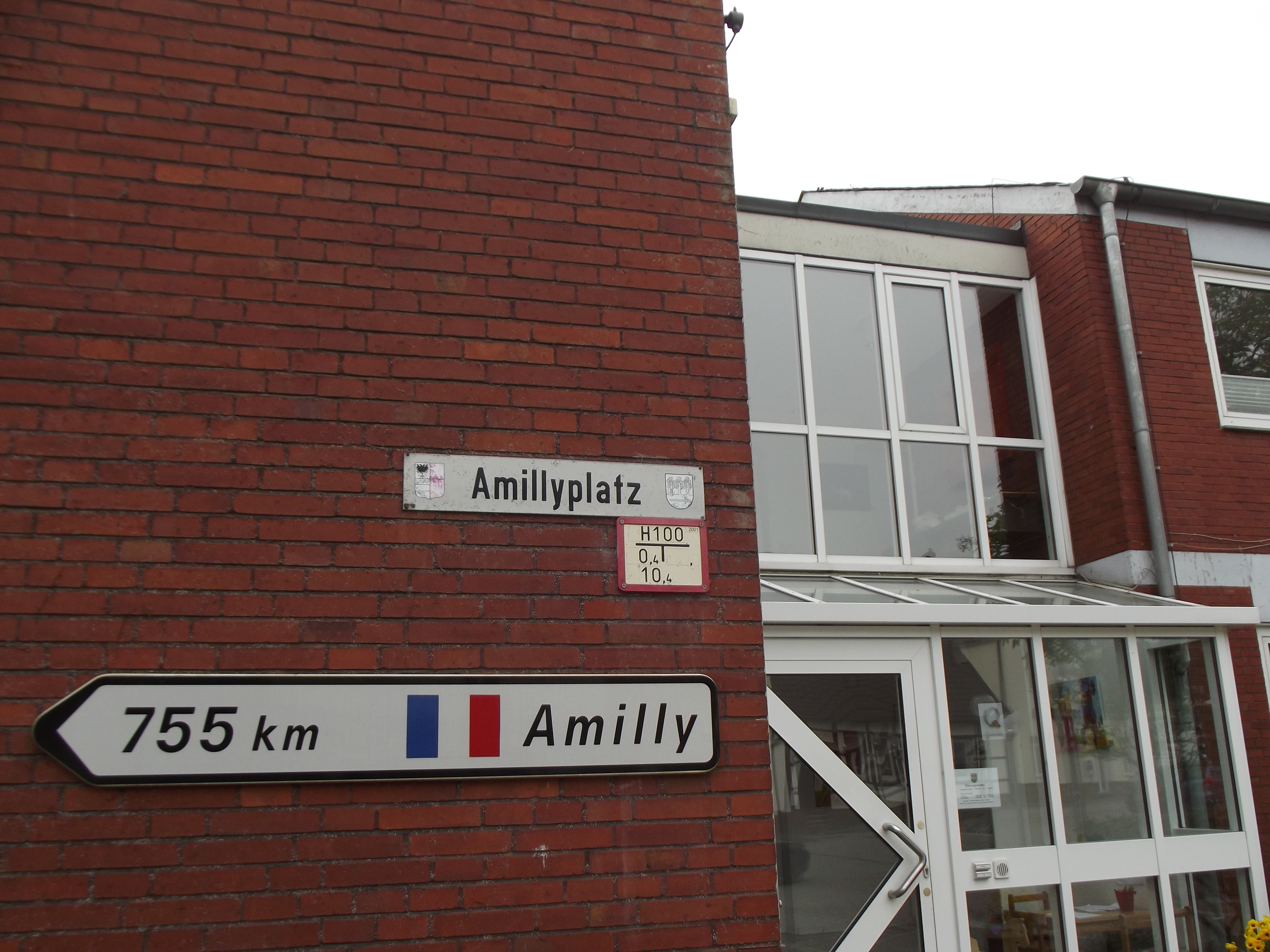
Guidepost for Amilly in twintown Nordwalde

- Nordwalde, Germany
- Vilanova del Camí, Spain
- Calcinaia, Italy

== Climate ==
Climate data for Amilly (1991–2020 normals, extremes 1966–present)
| Month | Jan | Feb | Mar | Apr | May | Jun | Jul | Aug | Sep | Oct | Nov | Dec | Year |
|---|---|---|---|---|---|---|---|---|---|---|---|---|---|
| Record high °C (°F) | 18.0 (64.4) | 22.0 (71.6) | 26.2 (79.2) | 31.0 (87.8) | 32.9 (91.2) | 38.7 (101.7) | 41.9 (107.4) | 42.1 (107.8) | 35.4 (95.7) | 30.6 (87.1) | 22.7 (72.9) | 18.0 (64.4) | 42.1 (107.8) |
| Mean daily maximum °C (°F) | 7.4 (45.3) | 8.9 (48.0) | 13.1 (55.6) | 16.7 (62.1) | 20.6 (69.1) | 24.2 (75.6) | 26.8 (80.2) | 26.7 (80.1) | 22.4 (72.3) | 17.2 (63.0) | 11.2 (52.2) | 7.9 (46.2) | 16.9 (62.4) |
| Daily mean °C (°F) | 4.3 (39.7) | 4.8 (40.6) | 7.9 (46.2) | 10.7 (51.3) | 14.5 (58.1) | 17.9 (64.2) | 20.0 (68.0) | 19.8 (67.6) | 16.0 (60.8) | 12.3 (54.1) | 7.6 (45.7) | 4.8 (40.6) | 11.7 (53.1) |
| Mean daily minimum °C (°F) | 1.3 (34.3) | 0.8 (33.4) | 2.7 (36.9) | 4.6 (40.3) | 8.4 (47.1) | 11.7 (53.1) | 13.3 (55.9) | 12.9 (55.2) | 9.6 (49.3) | 7.4 (45.3) | 3.9 (39.0) | 1.8 (35.2) | 6.5 (43.7) |
| Record low °C (°F) | −21.0 (−5.8) | −22.0 (−7.6) | −13.0 (8.6) | −6.3 (20.7) | −1.0 (30.2) | 0.1 (32.2) | 3.9 (39.0) | 2.4 (36.3) | −1.0 (30.2) | −7.8 (18.0) | −11.2 (11.8) | −17.2 (1.0) | −22.0 (−7.6) |
| Average precipitation mm (inches) | 46.7 (1.84) | 44.3 (1.74) | 44.1 (1.74) | 50.6 (1.99) | 66.1 (2.60) | 51.5 (2.03) | 56.4 (2.22) | 49.9 (1.96) | 48.5 (1.91) | 62.0 (2.44) | 61.7 (2.43) | 61.0 (2.40) | 642.8 (25.31) |
| Average precipitation days (≥ 1.0 mm) | 10.3 | 10.3 | 9.1 | 9.1 | 9.6 | 8.2 | 7.8 | 7.2 | 7.8 | 10.3 | 10.9 | 12.3 | 112.9 |
Source: Meteociel
