= Cepoy =

- Commune
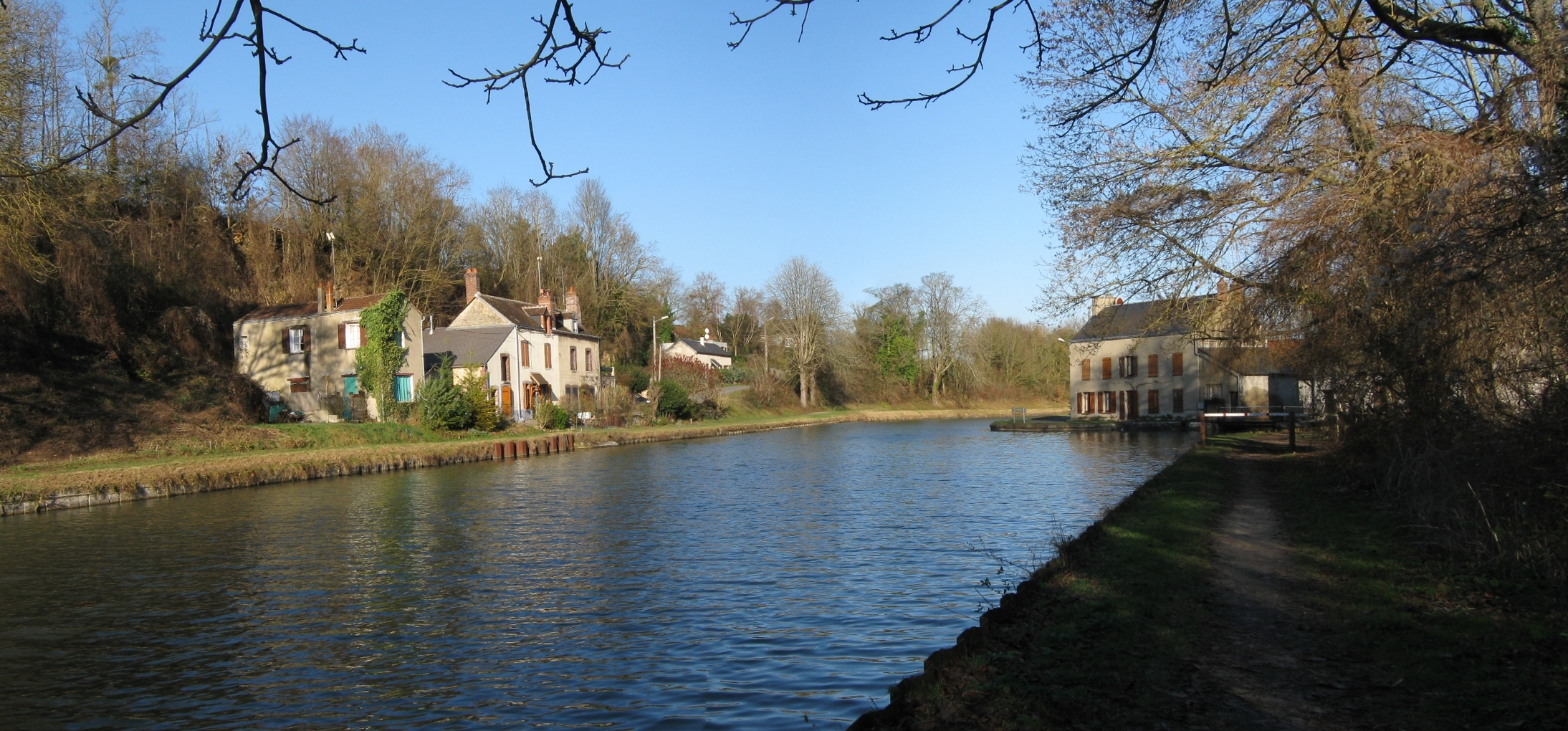
- The Loing Canal at the south west of Cepoy

- Coat of arms
- Location of Cepoy
- Location within France Location within Centre-Val de Loire
- Coordinates: 48°02′50″N 2°44′16″E
- Country: France
- Region: Centre-Val de Loire
- Department: Loiret
- Arrondissement: Montargis
- Canton: Châlette-sur-Loing
- Intercommunality: CA Montargoise et Rives du Loing

Government
  - Mayor (2020–2026): Régis Guerin
- Area^{1}: 8.52 km^{2} (3.29 sq mi)
- Highest elevation: 114 m (374 ft)
- Lowest elevation: 77 m (253 ft)
- Population (2023): 2,332
  - Density: 274/km^{2} (709/sq mi)
- Demonym(s): Cepoyennes, Cepoyens
- Time zone: UTC+01:00 (CET)
  - Summer (DST): UTC+02:00 (CEST)
- INSEE/Postal code: 45061 /45120
- Website: www.ville-cepoy.fr
- ^{1} French Land Register data, which excludes lakes, ponds, glaciers > 1 km^{2} (0.386 sq mi or 247 acres) and river estuaries.

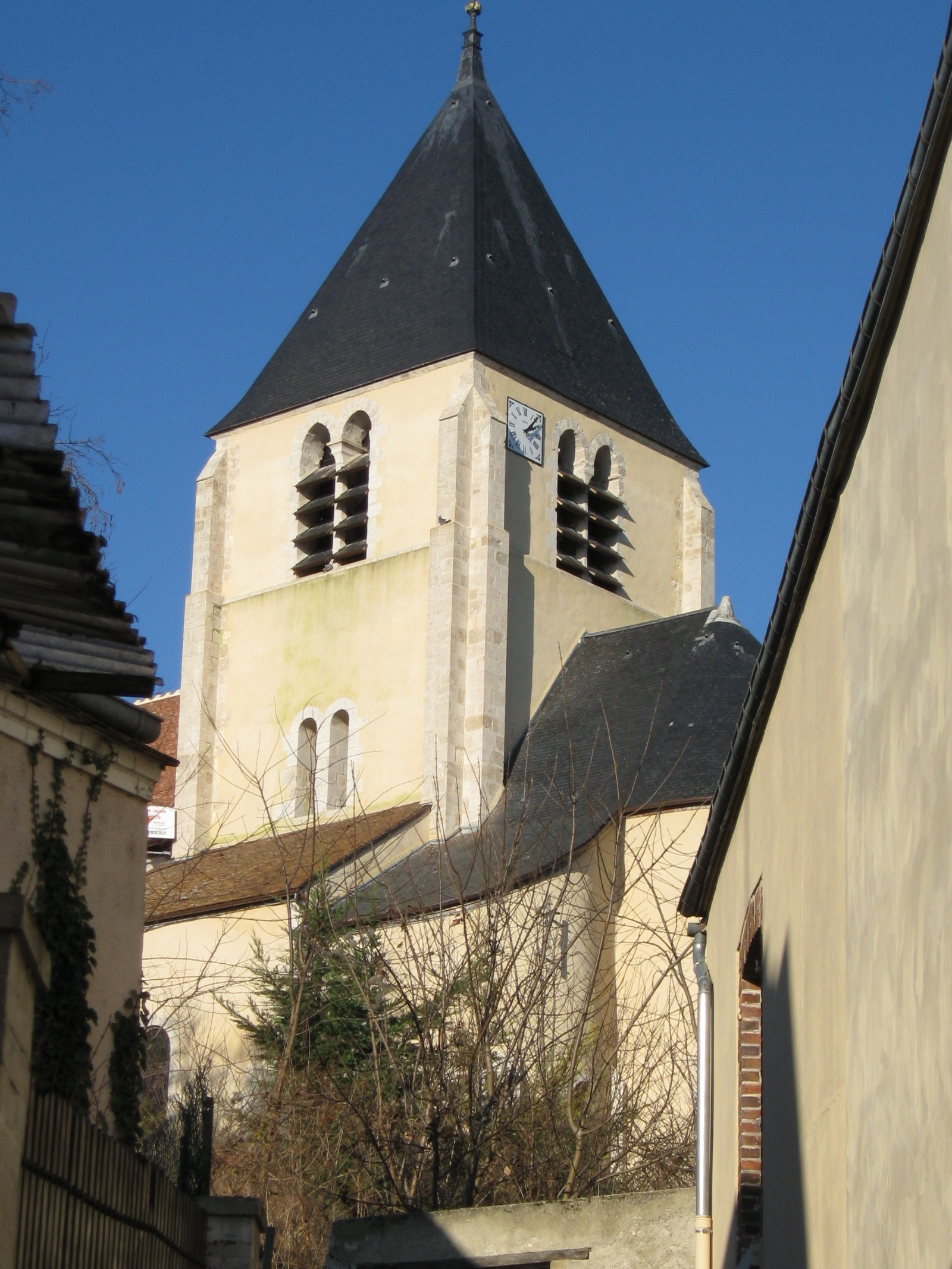
The church.

Cepoy (French pronunciation: [səpwa]) is a commune in the Loiret department in north-central France.

== Population ==
Historical population
Year	Pop.	±% p.a.
1968	1,584	—
1975	1,543	−0.37%
1982	1,856	+2.67%
1990	1,993	+0.89%
1999	2,064	+0.39%
2007	2,308	+1.41%
2012	2,347	+0.34%
2017	2,367	+0.17%
2023	2,332	−0.25%
Source: INSEE

== See also ==
- Communes of the Loiret department
