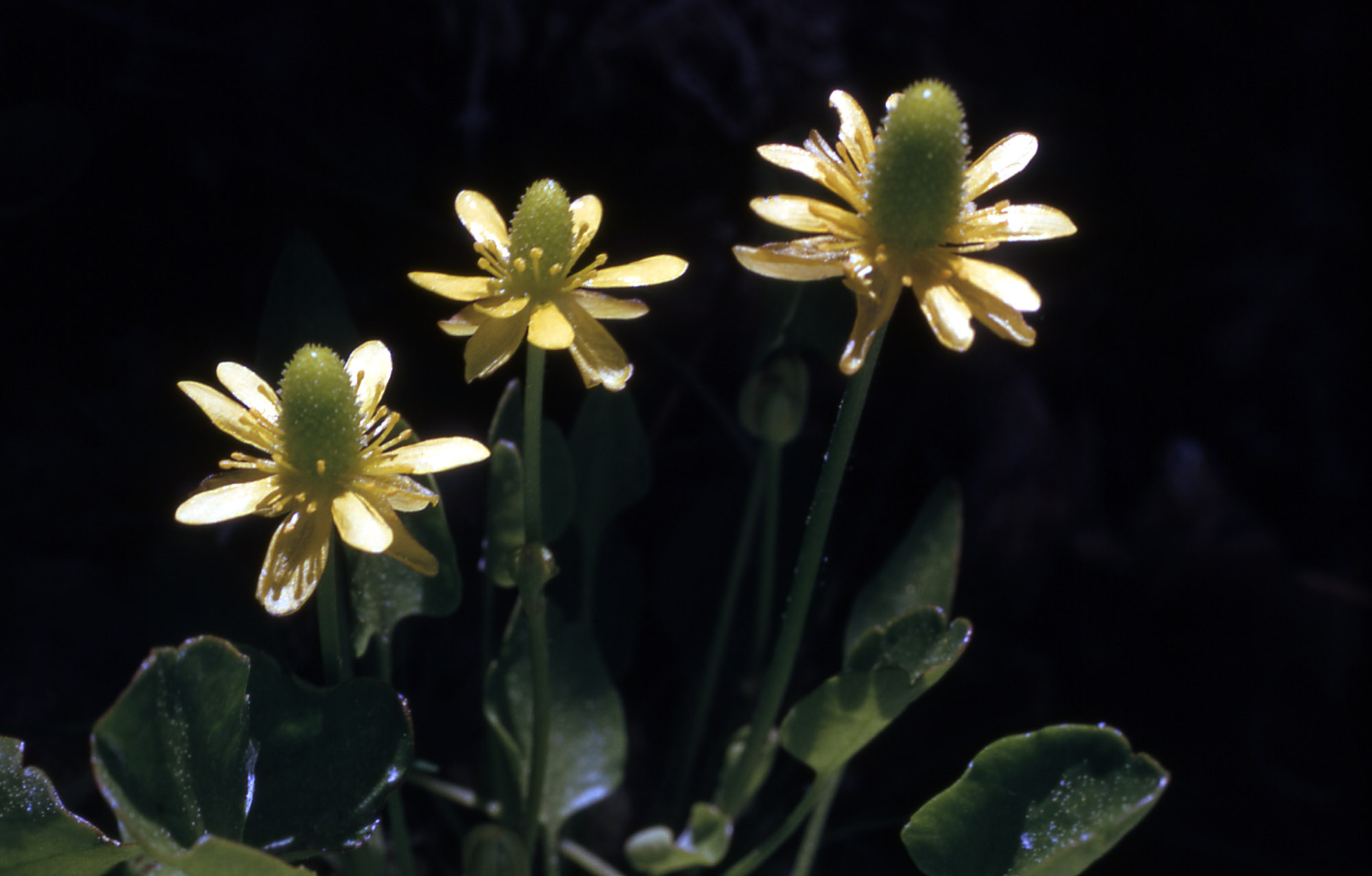

Scientific classification
- Kingdom: Plantae
- Clade: Tracheophytes
- Clade: Angiosperms
- Clade: Eudicots
- Order: Ranunculales
- Family: Ranunculaceae
- Genus: Halerpestes
- Species: H. cymbalaria

Binomial name
- Halerpestes cymbalaria (Pursh) Greene

Synonyms
- List: Cyrtorhyncha cymbalaria (Pursh) Britton; Halerpestes tridentata Greene; Oxygraphis cymbalaria (Pursh) Prantl; Oxygraphis tridentata (Kunth ex DC.) Prantl; Ranunculus cymbalaria Pursh; Ranunculus halophilus Schltdl.; Ranunculus hemignostus Steud.; Ranunculus maritimus Phil.; Ranunculus microcarpus C.Presl; Ranunculus minutus Gay; Ranunculus nanus Fisch. ex DC.; Ranunculus pozoifolius Gay; Ranunculus tridentatus Kunth ex DC.

= Halerpestes cymbalaria =

Species of buttercup

Halerpestes cymbalaria is a species of buttercup known by the common names alkali buttercup and seaside buttercup. It is native to much of Eurasia and parts of North and South America, where it grows in many types of habitat, especially in moist to wet areas such as marshes, bogs, and moist spring meadows. It is a perennial herb producing several stems a few centimeters to nearly 40 centimeters long. Some are prostrate against the ground and are stolons which root in moist substrate, and some are erect. The leaves are variable in shape, the basal ones with notched or slightly divided leaf blades borne on long petioles, and any upper leaves much reduced in size. The inflorescence bears one or more flowers on erect stalks. The flower has five to eight pale yellow petals, each under a centimeter long. The protruding receptacle at the center of the flower becomes a cylindrical cluster of fruits, each of which is an achene.
