= Pannes, Loiret =

Pannes
- Commune
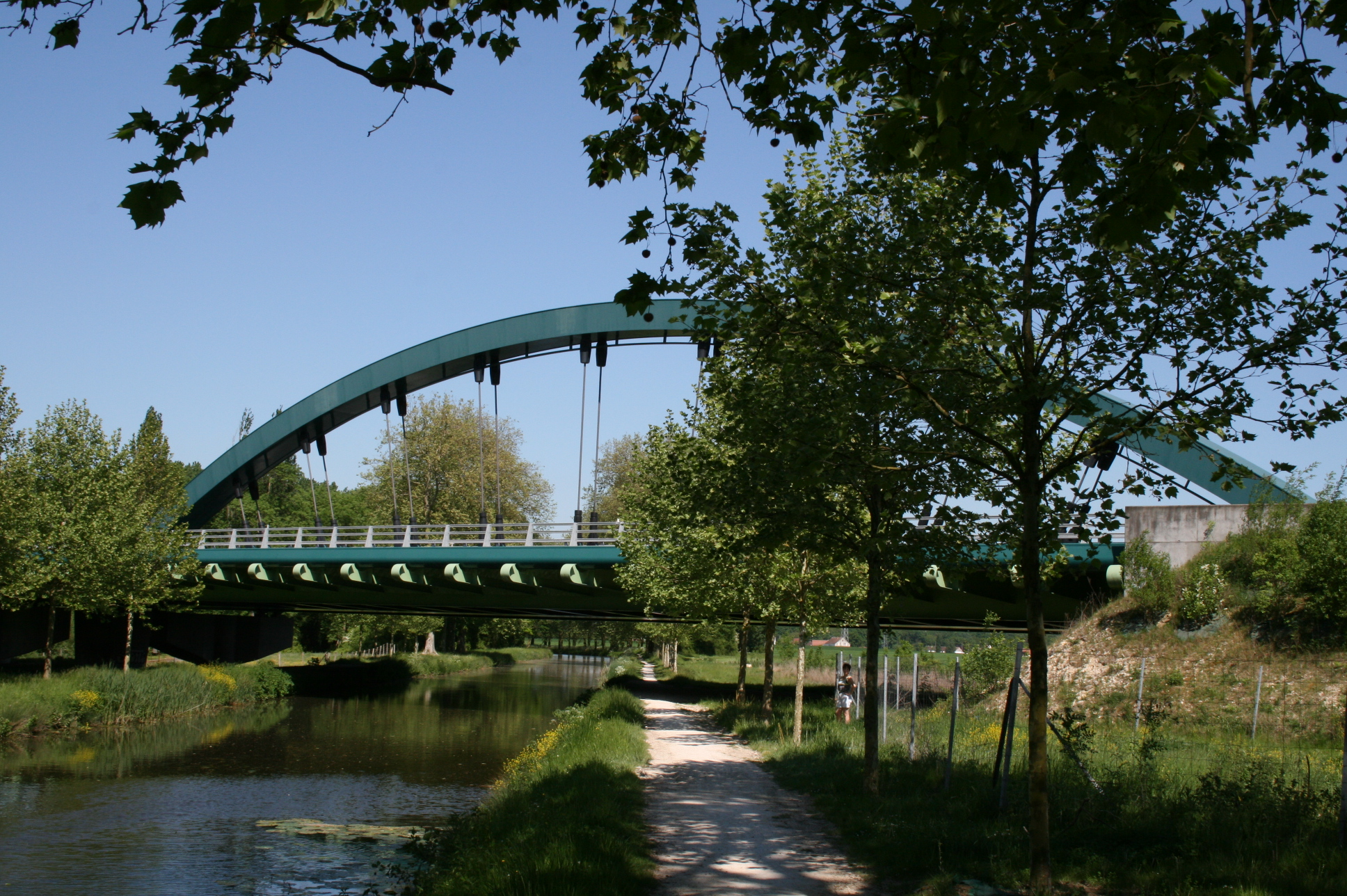
- The Pannes Viaduct

- Coat of arms
- Location of Pannes
- Location within France Location within Centre-Val de Loire
- Coordinates: 48°01′11″N 2°40′05″E
- Country: France
- Region: Centre-Val de Loire
- Department: Loiret
- Arrondissement: Montargis
- Canton: Montargis
- Intercommunality: CA Montargoise et Rives du Loing

Government
  - Mayor (2020–2026): Dominique Laurent
- Area^{1}: 20.84 km^{2} (8.05 sq mi)
- Highest elevation: 107 m (351 ft)
- Lowest elevation: 83 m (272 ft)
- Population (2023): 3,740
  - Density: 179/km^{2} (465/sq mi)
- Demonym: Pannois·e
- Time zone: UTC+01:00 (CET)
  - Summer (DST): UTC+02:00 (CEST)
- INSEE/Postal code: 45247 /45700
- Website: http://www.ville-pannes.fr
- ^{1} French Land Register data, which excludes lakes, ponds, glaciers > 1 km^{2} (0.386 sq mi or 247 acres) and river estuaries.

Pannes (French pronunciation: [pan]) is a commune in the department of Loiret, Centre-Val de Loire, France.

== Population ==
Historical population
| Year | Pop. | ±% p.a. |
|---|---|---|
| 1968 | 1,462 | — |
| 1975 | 2,262 | +6.43% |
| 1982 | 2,753 | +2.85% |
| 1990 | 2,861 | +0.48% |
| 1999 | 2,913 | +0.20% |
| 2007 | 3,150 | +0.98% |
| 2012 | 3,545 | +2.39% |
| 2017 | 3,698 | +0.85% |
| 2023 | 3,740 | +0.19% |
Source: INSEE

== See also ==
- Communes of the Loiret department
