= Equine encephalomyelitis =

Equine encephalomyelitis may refer to:

- Eastern equine encephalitis virus
- Western equine encephalitis virus
- Venezuelan equine encephalitis virus

== See also ==
- Viral encephalitis
