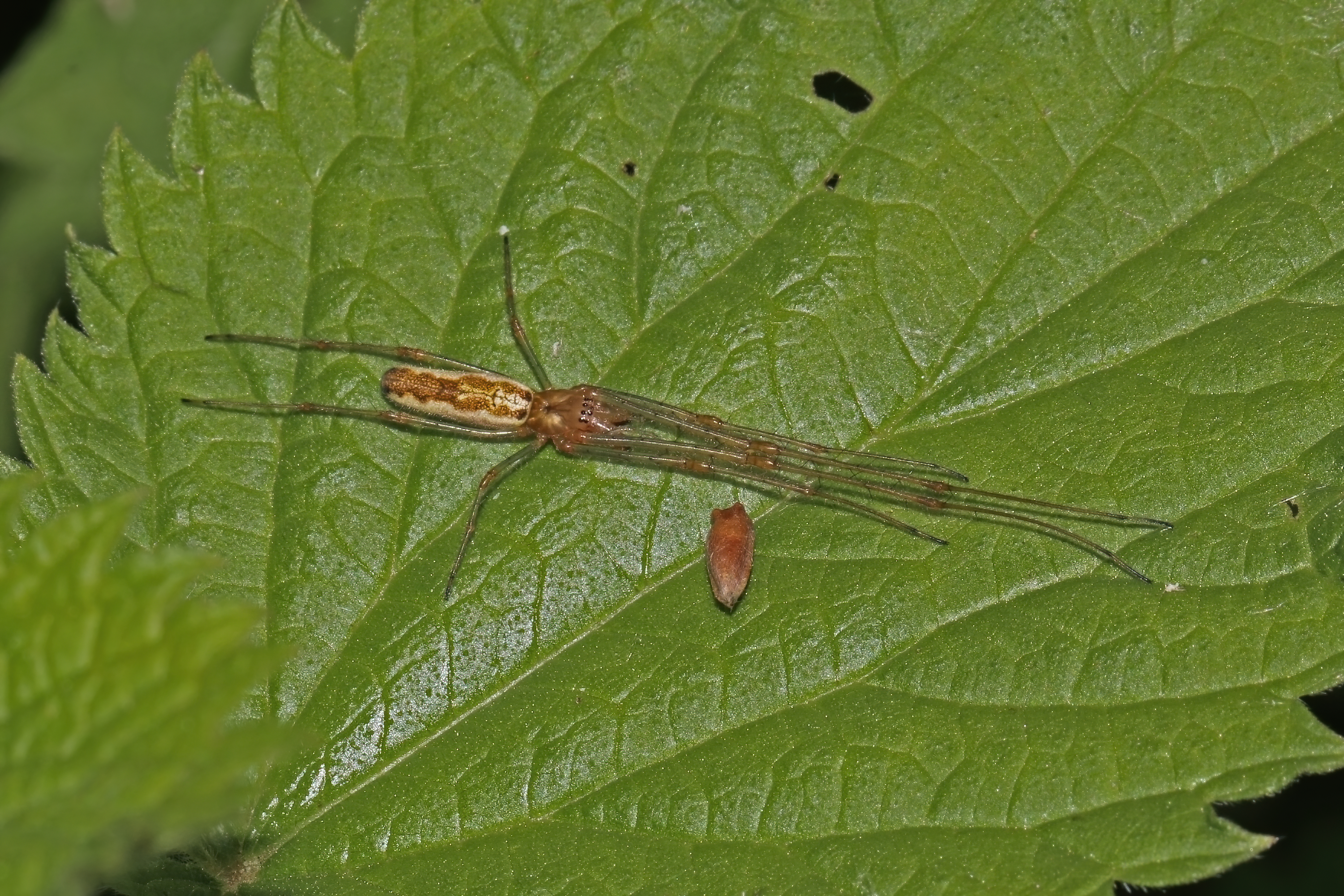
- Female in defensive pose

Scientific classification
- Kingdom: Animalia
- Phylum: Arthropoda
- Subphylum: Chelicerata
- Class: Arachnida
- Order: Araneae
- Infraorder: Araneomorphae
- Family: Tetragnathidae
- Genus: Tetragnatha
- Species: T. montana

Binomial name
- Tetragnatha montana Simon, 1874

Synonyms
- Tetragnatha solandri Kulczyński, 1903

= Tetragnatha montana =

Species of spider

Tetragnatha montana, commonly known as the silver stretch spider, is a species of long-jawed orb weaver from the family Tetragnathidae that has a Palearctic distribution. It preys mostly on flies and mosquitoes. The name silver stretch spider refers to its shiny metallic colour and its habit of extending its legs into a stick like shape.

== Taxonomy and naming ==
The silver stretch spider was described by the French naturalist Eugène Simon in 1874 in his work Les arachnides de France. Polish zoologist Władysław Kulczyński named T. solandri in 1903, subsequently classified as the same species. The generic name, Tetragnatha, is made up of Tetra meaning "four" and gnatha meaning "jaws" in Greek; referring to the unusually long chelicerae and fangs of these spiders and the specific name montana means "of the mountains".

== Description ==
The female Tetragnatha montana is larger than the male with a body length of 7–13 mm compared to the male's 6–8 mm. The male has a paracymbium (a genital appendage arising from the base of the cymbium) with a mostly hook-shaped lateral process. In the female, the epigyne has straight or convex posterior margin of epigynal plate. The prosoma is yellow-brown and the sternum is dark brown to black. It has yellow-brown chelicerae, with a small round tubercle adjacent to the dorsal tooth of the male chelicerae. The legs are yellow-brown and the opisthosoma is silver on the dorsal surface with an elongated, silver-white leaf shape outlined in gold with golden wavy borders along the margins and black lines that can sometimes be quite thick with a brown ventral surface. The male has very similar markings on the abdomen to the female but it is a darker, reddish-gold and the colour contrasts are less noticeable than those on the female, and the white or silvery areas are much less extensive. The male's ventral side is brown, with undulating borders and a darker band running along it. The legs differ significantly between the sexes in their length, colour and shape, those of the female being brown, beige or yellow-brown in colour, while those of the male are darker. The leg pairs one, two and four are very long while three is relatively short and is used to help the spider to hold onto thin twigs or grass when resting, while the other three pairs are extended. In both sexes there are often dark rings and spots towards the claws.

== Behaviour ==
The adults of T. montana appear in the open from May to September although the first to appear as early as February. Their main prey is flies and mosquitoes. These are caught in the spider's orb-web, which is an upright web formed of threads radiating from a central point, crossed by radial links that spiral in from the margin, between branches and stems on trees, bushes and low vegetation. The spider sits stretched out, near the web, waiting for the prey, difficult to detect due to the stick like shape adopted. If an insect flies into the web it is caught in the silk and the spider bites it injecting venom which liquifies the prey's internal organs. The spider then wraps the insect in silk like a parcel and stores it close to the web. The spider then repairs the web.

When T. montana is at rest, or when it is alarmed it adopts the distinctive elongated posture used by species within the genus Tetragnatha, stretching their two pairs of front legs out beyond the head and the rear pair extending backwards. This together with their drab colouration and thin bodies, can be an effective camouflage.

One study showed that mosquitoes formed over 60% of the food items of T. montana specimens collected from webs in an alder forest in Poland, it was calculated that an individual consumes an average of 3.7 mosquitoes in a day, in the first half of the month of June with the amount of mosquitoes caught and eaten declining as the summer progressed. A relationship was uncovered between the seasonal occurrence, abundance and activity of the spider and that of mosquitoes. This study showed that the main mosquito species caught were Aedes rusticus, Aedes cinereus and Aedes punctor which were the most abundant mosquitoes in the study area, but they were disproportionately numerous among the mosquitos preyed upon. In Great Britain 13 out of 81 T. montana sampled showed evidence of having preyed on adult mosquitoes.

=== Reproduction ===
Mating in Tetragnatha montana is not initiated through courtship by the males, the male avoids being bitten by the female by locking her chelicerae in his own, using a spur and escapes after mating. The female then produces a dark green cocoon where she stores the fertilised eggs, this is encased in a fine white web. The cocoon is attached to vegetation, most commonly leaves, and the female guards and protects the cocoon against predators until the spiderlings hatch, after about 100 days. Molecular markers (allozymes) have been used to confirm that wild-collected females of T. montana, mated with multiple males, indicating that sperm competition is potentially an important driver in the evolution of the species' mating system.

=== Predators and parasites ===
Live T. montana parasitized by Acrodactyla quadrisculpta larva

The main predators of T. montana are birds and insectivores, such as shrews and hedgehogs. The ichneumonid wasp Acrodactyla quadrisculpta has been recorded as a koinobiont parasitoid of T. montana. The wasp is host specific and 19% of T. montana in one population studied were parasitized, the parasitized spider builds a unique cocoon web which provides mechanical support for the wasp's pupal cocoon. The cocoon web consists of one reinforced main thread, often reinforced by a side thread, the wasp's cocoon is square and is fastened along the length of the main thread.

T. montana has also been recorded as a host for Wolbachia bacteria which are reproductive parasites of many arthropods and nematodes. These parasites can influence the sex ratio of the host's progeny and in T. montana were apparently more common in females than males.

== Distribution and habitat ==
T. montana is widespread throughout a large part of the Palearctic from Western Europe to East Asia and is the most frequently occurring species of Tetragnatha in many parts of Europe. as far north as southern Norway and south to Iran. In Great Britain it is widespread in the south, becoming localised in the north.

T. montana webs are found on trees, bushes and low vegetation in a variety of mostly lowland habitats. The webs may be found close to water but it is less closely associated with wetland habitats than its congener Tetragnatha extensa.
