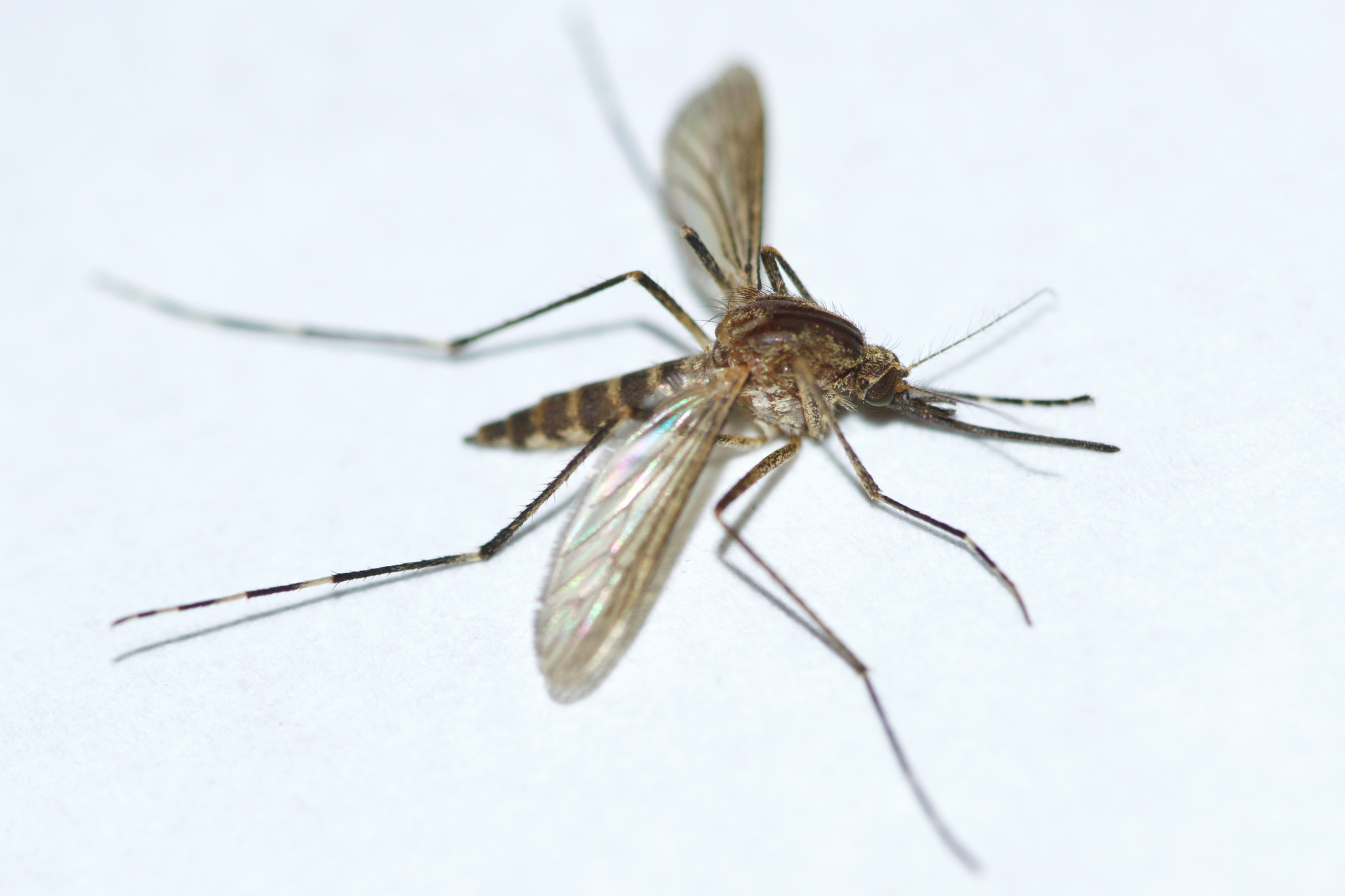

Scientific classification
- Kingdom: Animalia
- Phylum: Arthropoda
- Class: Insecta
- Order: Diptera
- Family: Culicidae
- Genus: Aedes
- Subgenus: Ochlerotatus
- Species: A. excrucians

Binomial name
- Aedes excrucians (Walker, 1856)

= Aedes excrucians =

Species of mosquito

Aedes excrucians is a species of mosquito belonging to the genus Aedes. This species is closely related to other snowpool mosquitoes such as Aedes communis and Aedes stimulans.

== Distribution ==
Aedes excrucians is widely distributed across northern North America, including the northern United States, Canada, and Alaska. Its range extends southward to northern New Jersey on the east coast and southern Oregon in the west, with isolated populations in higher elevations as far south as northern New Mexico. It is also present in Europe and Northern Asia, excluding China.

This species is commonly found in forested areas, particularly in moderately deep snowpools lined with heavy leaf litter. These pools form during early spring from melting snow. The larvae are typically present in early spring, with development occurring primarily in April. The species follows a univoltine life cycle, meaning it produces a single generation per year. Eggs are laid around drying snowpools and enter diapause until the following spring. This species often shares habitats with other mosquitoes such as Aedes communis, Aedes stimulans, and Aedes grossbecki. In mixed habitats, it is typically at least two instars behind Aedes communis in larval development.

== Description ==
The larvae of Aedes excrucians are relatively large, with distinctive features such as a long, slender siphon tube. The pecten teeth on the siphon are detached, distinguishing it from similar species like Aedes fitchii. Adults are long-lived and can be collected into August. Adults emerge in May and remain active throughout the summer. Females lay eggs near snowpools that dry down as spring progresses. These eggs undergo an obligatory diapause to survive until the next season.

== Medical significance ==
While Aedes excrucians is not considered a significant pest in most areas, its bite can be irritating, hence its name. It has been implicated in the transmission of dog heartworm (Dirofilaria immitis) in parts of its range. However, its role as a vector for human diseases appears limited compared to other Aedes species.

== See also ==
- List of Aedes species
