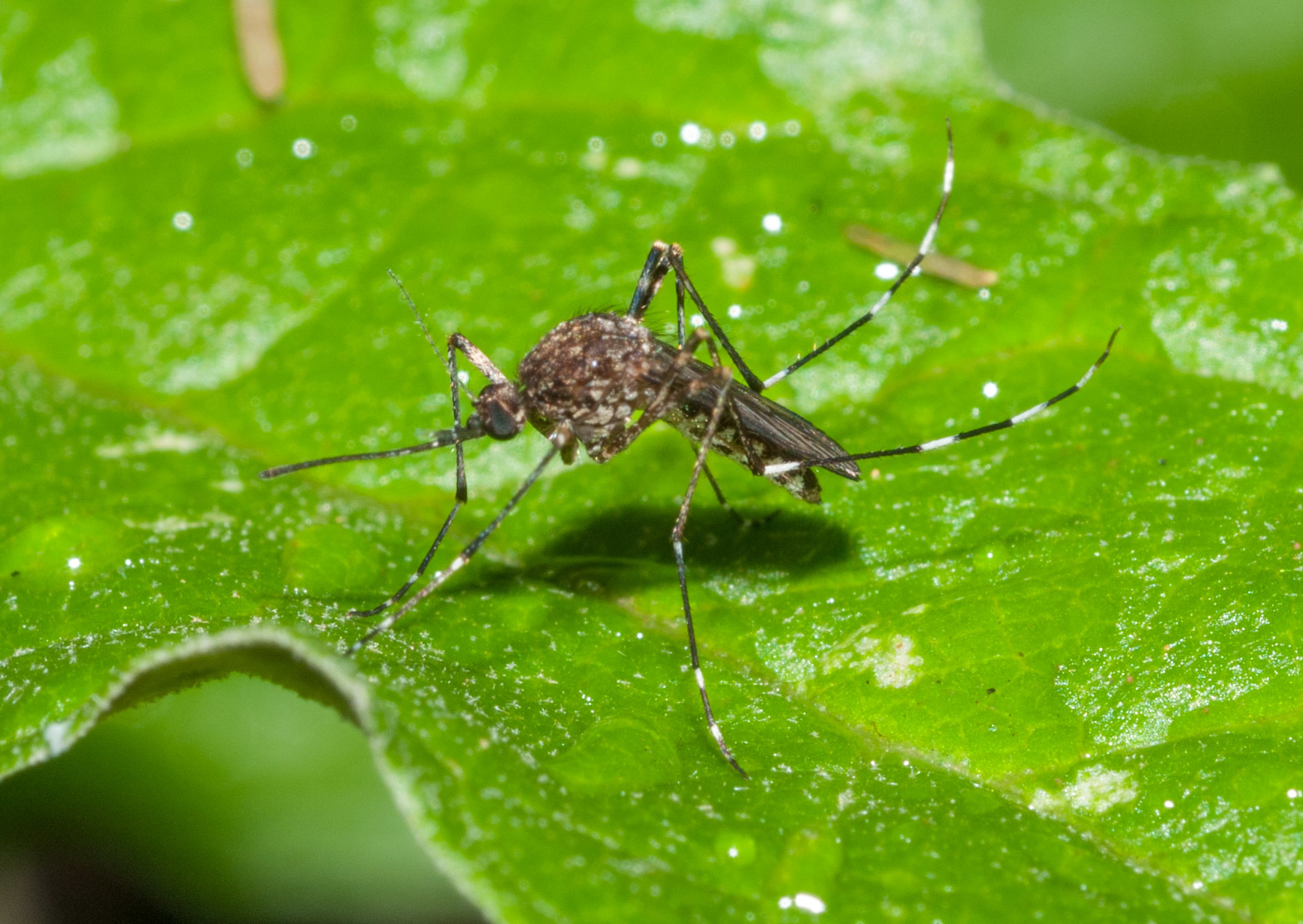

Scientific classification
- Kingdom: Animalia
- Phylum: Arthropoda
- Class: Insecta
- Order: Diptera
- Family: Culicidae
- Genus: Aedes
- Subgenus: Dobrotworskyius
- Species: A. alboannulatus

Binomial name
- Aedes alboannulatus (Macquart, 1850)

Synonyms
- Culex alboannulatus Macquart, 1850; Dobrotworskyius alboannulatus

= Aedes alboannulatus =

Species of mosquito

Aedes alboannulatus is a mosquito species of the genus Aedes that is native to Australia. This species breeds in rain filled pools, in open, sunlit, or forest areas. The eggs are resistant to drying out, often laid on the soil substrate of drying pools.

Adults bite humans readily, usually at dusk or shaded areas during the day. Birds are also bitten by A. alboannulatus.

== Distribution ==
Aedes alboannulatus is widely distributed across southern Australia, occurring in both coastal and inland regions of southern Queensland, New South Wales, Victoria, Tasmania, South Australia and southern Western Australia.

== Disease transmission ==
Laboratory studies have demonstrated that Aedes alboannulatus can carry the Murray Valley encephalitis virus, a flavivirus present in parts of Australia. However, it is a poor vector compared to species like Culex annulirostris and Aedes sagax.
