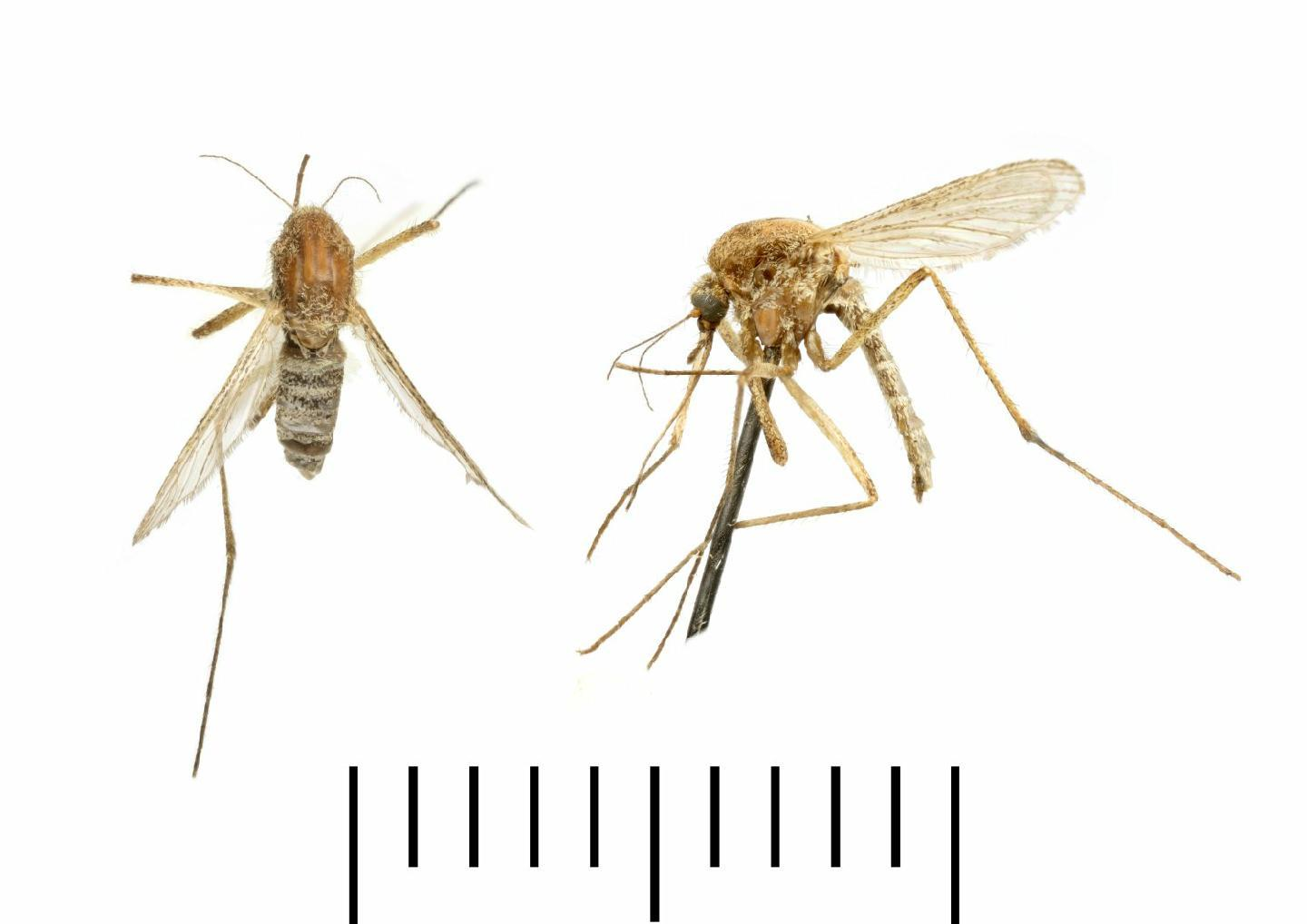

Scientific classification
- Kingdom: Animalia
- Phylum: Arthropoda
- Class: Insecta
- Order: Diptera
- Family: Culicidae
- Genus: Aedes
- Subgenus: Ochlerotatus
- Species: A. detritus

Binomial name
- Aedes detritus (Haliday, 1833)

= Aedes detritus =

Species of mosquito

Aedes detritus, the saltmarsh mosquito, is a species of mosquito from the genus Aedes.

== Distribution ==
This species is native to Europe and is predominantly found in coastal regions. It is especially abundant in marshlands where it often represents the majority of mosquito populations sampled.

Aedes detritus is primarily found in coastal salt marshes but can also inhabit brackish water pools. It is a multivoltine species, capable of producing several generations per year. Larvae develop in saline or brackish water environments, often in areas with fluctuating salinity levels. Occasionally, freshwater streams near marshes may dilute salinity, allowing for mixed populations with other mosquito species such as Aedes caspius.

== Medical importance ==
While there is limited specific information on the vector capacity of Aedes detritus, it has been shown that this species has the potential to be a competent vector of Japanese encephalitis virus.
