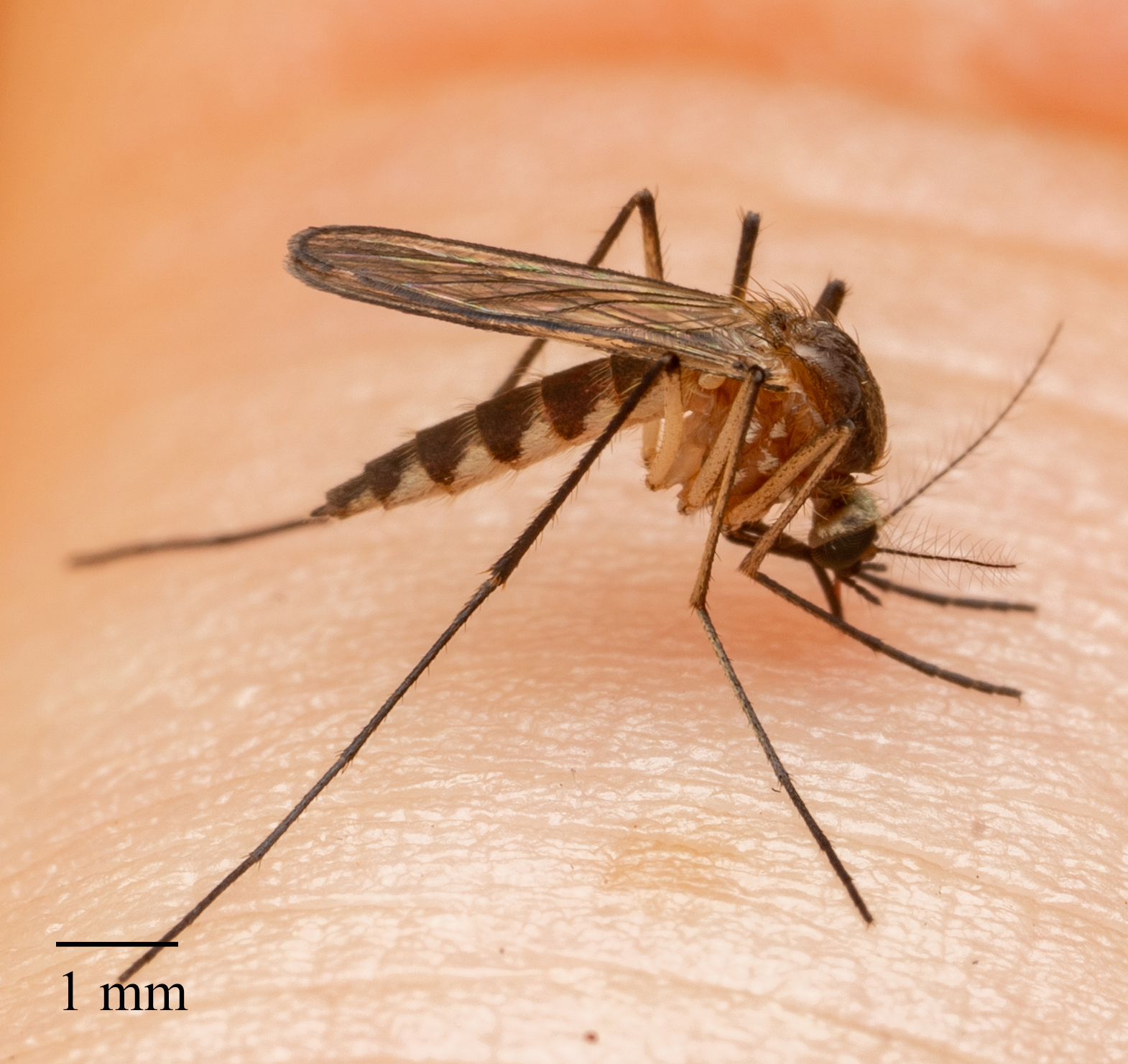

Scientific classification
- Kingdom: Animalia
- Phylum: Arthropoda
- Clade: Pancrustacea
- Class: Insecta
- Order: Diptera
- Family: Culicidae
- Genus: Aedes
- Subgenus: Ochlerotatus
- Species: A. infirmatus

Binomial name
- Aedes infirmatus (Dyar and Knab, 1906)

= Aedes infirmatus =

Species of mosquito

Aedes infirmatus, informally referred to as the infirm American pointy mosquito or silverback mosquito, is a species of mosquito that is found in woodland environments in parts of Central America, Mexico, and the southern United States, with a type locality in Baton Rouge, Louisiana. In the United States, they have been found as far west as Texas and as far north as New Jersey.

== Description ==
Adults of the species have a dark-scaled proboscis, dark legs, and a broad silvery white patch on their thorax which helps distinguish them from other species of similar appearance.

== Life cycle ==
The lifecycle of mosquitoes in the Aedes genus.

Females of this species typically lay their eggs in low-lying grassy areas prone to flooding; the eggs are stimulated to hatch by flooding which often takes place in the spring. Adults will opportunistically feed on passing hosts, including humans, in the woodland environments where their populations are most dense, but only rarely enter buildings. Studies in northeastern Florida found a negative correlation between population density of A. infirmatus and agricultural land use, and additionally found that average peak abundance for the species typically occurred between June and August.

== Medical importance ==
This species of mosquito vectors a variety of pathogens, including California encephalitis virus, Keystone virus, trivittatus virus, West Nile virus, and Eastern equine encephalitis.
