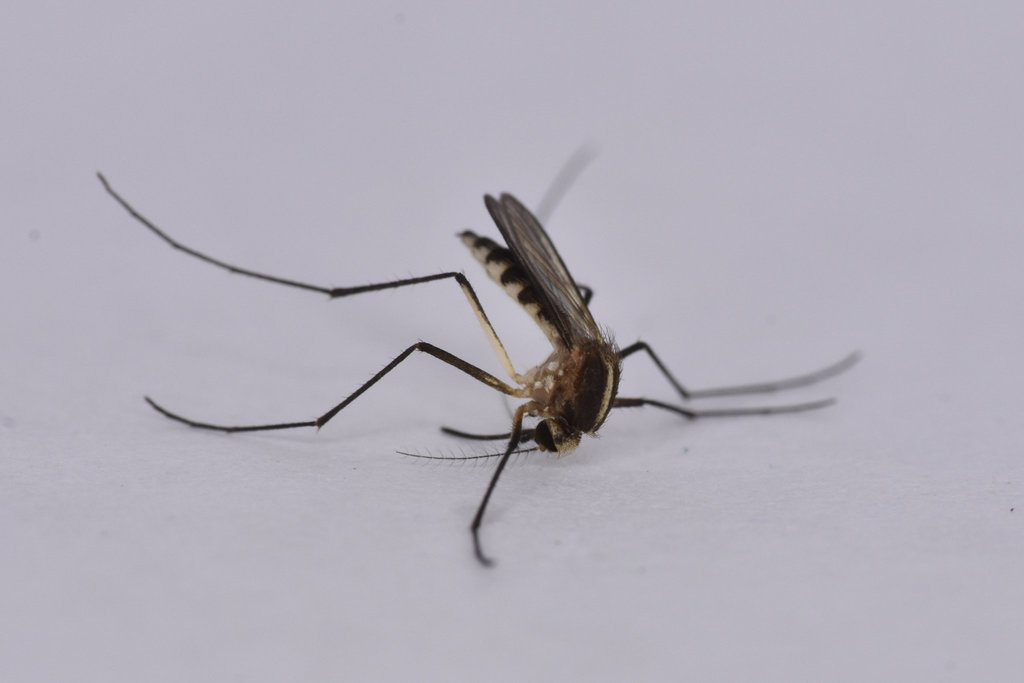

Scientific classification
- Kingdom: Animalia
- Phylum: Arthropoda
- Class: Insecta
- Order: Diptera
- Family: Culicidae
- Genus: Aedes
- Subgenus: Ochlerotatus
- Species: A. tormentor

Binomial name
- Aedes tormentor (Dyar and Knab, 1906)

= Aedes tormentor =

Species of mosquito

Aedes tormentor is a species of mosquito of the genus Aedes. It is closely related to Aedes atlanticus, with the two species being difficult to distinguish visually.

== Description ==
A. tormentor is a medium-sized mosquito species. The adult females are known to be aggressive biters, as suggested by the species name "tormentor".

Due to the strong visual similarity between A. tormentor and A. atlanticus, traditional morphological identification methods are often insufficient to distinguish between the two species. Researchers have developed a restriction enzyme assay based on DNA sequence data to differentiate between A. atlanticus and A. tormentor. This molecular approach allows for more accurate species identification, which is crucial for ecological studies and mosquito control efforts.

== Distribution ==
This mosquito species is found throughout the southeastern United States, particularly in woodland areas. A. tormentor is classified as a floodwater mosquito, meaning its eggs are laid in areas prone to flooding. The larvae of A. tormentor develop in temporary water bodies created by rainfall or flooding events.

== See also ==
- List of Aedes species
