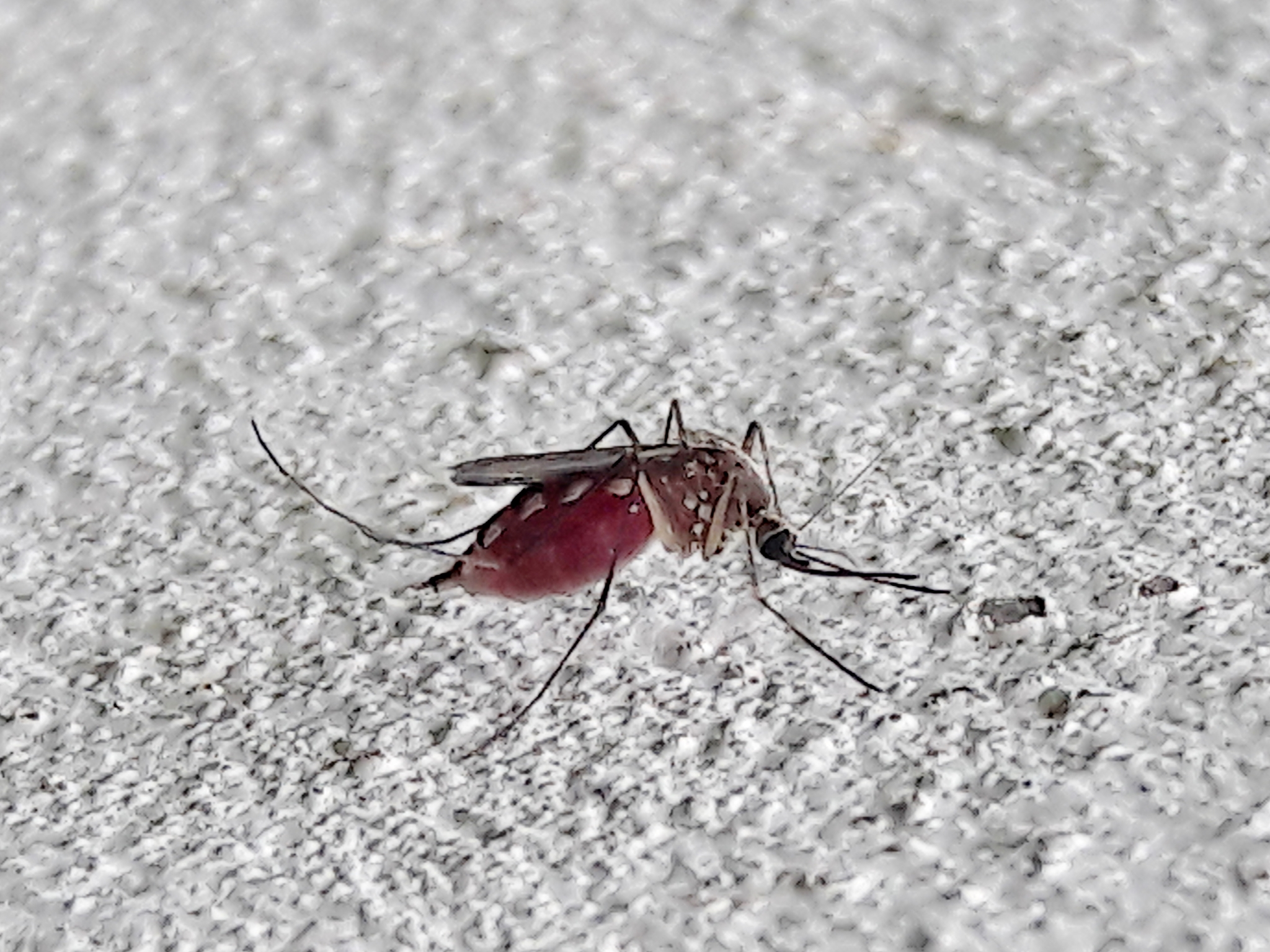

Scientific classification
- Kingdom: Animalia
- Phylum: Arthropoda
- Class: Insecta
- Order: Diptera
- Family: Culicidae
- Genus: Aedes
- Subgenus: Ochlerotatus
- Species: A. condolescens

Binomial name
- Aedes condolescens (Dyar and Knab, 1907)

= Aedes condolescens =

Species of mosquito

Aedes condolescens is a species of mosquito in the genus Aedes.

== Distribution ==
Aedes condolescens is found in Monroe County, Florida, specifically within the Florida Keys. It has been recorded on wilderness islands within the National Key Deer Refuge and the Great White Heron National Wildlife Refuge.

Aedes condolescens is commonly found in mangrove swampland and solution holes within the studied islands. It is often collected alongside other mosquito species such as Aedes taeniorhynchus, Anopheles atropos, Culex bahamensis, Culex nigripalpus, and Deinocerites cancer. In mosquito surveillance programs, it is often collected using dry ice-baited light traps.
