= Ochlerotatus =

Scientific classification
- Kingdom: Animalia
- Phylum: Arthropoda
- Clade: Pancrustacea
- Class: Insecta
- Order: Diptera
- Family: Culicidae
- Tribe: Aedini
- Genus: Ochlerotatus; Lynch Arribalzaga, 1891

Genus of mosquitoes

Ochlerotatus is a genus of mosquito. Until 2000, it was ranked as a subgenus of Aedes but was reclassified as a distinct genus based on taxonomic studies. This change resulted in the renaming of many subgenus species, and revisions of related taxa in the Aedini tribe are ongoing. Some authors, however, still use traditional taxonomic names in their publications.

== Taxonomy ==
Ochlerotatus was originally established as a genus in 1891. In 1917, a researcher by the name of Edwards transferred it to the aedine subgenus; however, as of 2000, Ochlerotatus has resumed its role as a genus (a revision made by Reinhert, due to common traits in genitalia). Based on taxonomic characteristics, many species and subgenera of Aedes mosquitoes have been transferred to the Ochlerotatus genus.

After a contentious worldwide debate regarding the effect the taxonomic changes would have on names established over decades of work in scientific, government, and lay communities, many scientists and others affected by the change espoused the continued use of the previously established names. As of 2016, the previously established names are supported by and accepted for publication in many scientific journals.

== Species ==
As of 2022, Ochlerotatus has the following species:

- Aedes aboriginis Dyar, 1917-northwest coast mosquito
- Aedes abserratus (Felt and Young, 1904)
- Aedes aculeatus (Theobald, 1903)
- Aedes aenigmaticus Cerqueira and Costa, 1946
- Aedes akkeshiensis Tanaka, 1998
- Aedes albifasciatus (Macquart, 1838)
- Aedes albineus Séguy, 1923
- Aedes aloponotum Dyar, 1917
- Aedes amateuri Ortega and Zavortink in Ortega-Morales et al., 2019
- Aedes ambreensis Rodhain and Boutonnier, 1983
- Aedes andersoni Edwards, 1926
- Aedes angustivittatus Dyar and Knab, 1907
- Aedes annulipes (Meigen, 1830)
- Aedes antipodeus (Edwards, 1920)
- Aedes arundinariae Kasper, 2020
- Aedes atactavittatus Arnell, 1976
- Aedes atlanticus Dyar and Knab, 1906
- Aedes auratus Grabham, 1906
- Aedes aurifer (Coquillett, 1903)
- Aedes behningi Martini, 1926
- Aedes bejaranoi Martínez, Carcavallo and Prosen, 1960
- Aedes berlandi Séguy, 1921
- Aedes bimaculatus (Coquillett, 1902)
- Aedes biskraensis Brunhes, 1999
- Aedes bogotanus Arnell, 1976
- Aedes breedensis Muspratt, 1953
- Aedes burjaticus (Kuchartshuk, 1973)
- Aedes burpengaryensis (Theobald, 1905)
- Aedes caballus (Theobald, 1912)
- Aedes cacozelus Marks, 1963
- Aedes calcariae Marks, 1957
- Aedes calumnior Belkin, Heinemann and Page, 1970
- Aedes campestris Dyar and Knab, 1907
- Aedes camptorhynchus (Thomson, 1869)
- Aedes canadensis (Theobald, 1901)- woodland pool mosquito
- Aedes cantans (Meigen, 1818)
- Aedes cantator (Coquillett, 1903) - brown saltmarsh mosquito
- Aedes caspius (Pallas, 1771)
- Aedes cataphylla Dyar, 1916
- Aedes chelli (Edwards, 1915)
- Aedes churchillensis Ellisand Burst, 1973
- Aedes clelandi (Taylor, 1914)
- Aedes clivis Lanzaro and Eldridge, 1992
- Aedes coluzzii Rioux, Guilvard and Pasteur, 1998
- Aedes comitatus Arnell, 1976
- Aedes communis (de Geer, 1776)
- Aedes condolescens Dyar and Knab, 1907
- Aedes continentalis Dobrotworsky, 1960
- Aedes crinifer (Theobald, 1903)
- Aedes cunabulanus Edwards, 1924
- Aedes cyprioides Danilov and Stupin, 1982
- Aedes cyprius Ludlow, 1920
- Aedes dahlae (Nielsen, 2009)
- Aedes decticus Howard, Dyar and Knab, 1917
- Aedes deficiens Arnell, 1976
- Aedes detritus Haliday, 1833
- Aedes diantaeus Howard, Dyar and Knab, 1913
- Aedes dorsalis (Meigen, 1830)
- Aedes dufouri Hamon, 1953
- Aedes duplex Martini, 1926
- Aedes dupreei (Coquillett, 1904)
- Aedes dzeta Séguy, 1924
- Aedes edgari Stone and Rosen, 1952
- Aedes eidsvoldensis Mackerras, 1927
- Aedes eucephalaeus Dyar, 1918
- Aedes euedes Howard, Dyar and Knab, 1913
- Aedes euiris Dyar, 1922
- Aedes euplocamus Dyar and Knab, 1906
- Aedes excrucians (Walker, 1856)
- Aedes explorator Marks, 1964
- Aedes fitchii (Felt and Young, 1904)
- Aedes flavescens (Müller, 1764)
- Aedes flavifrons (Skuse, 1889)
- Aedes fulvus (Wiedemann, 1828)
- Aedes grossbecki Dyar and Knab, 1906
- Aedes gutzevichi Dubitzky and Deshevykh, 1978
- Aedes hakusanensis Yamagutiand Tamaboko, 1954
- Aedes harrisoni Muspratt, 1953
- Aedes hastatus Dyar, 1922
- Aedes hesperonotius Marks, 1959
- Aedes hexodontus Dyar, 1916
- Aedes hodgkini Marks, 1959
- Aedes hokkaidensis Tanaka, Mizusawa and Saugstad, 1979
- Aedes hungaricus Mihályi, 1955
- Aedes imperfectus Dobrotworsky, 1962
- Aedes impiger (Walker, 1848)
- Aedes implicatus Vockeroth, 1954
- Aedes incomptus Arnell, 1976
- Aedes increpitus Dyar, 1916
- Aedes inexpectatus BonneWepster, 1948
- Aedes infirmatus Dyar and Knab, 1906
- Aedes intermedius Danilov and Gornostaeva, 1987
- Aedes intrudens Dyar, 1919
- Aedes jacobinae Serafim and Davis, 1933
- Aedes jorgi Carpintero and Leguizamón, 2000
- Aedes juppi McIntosh, 1973
- Aedes kasachstanicus Gutsevich, 1962
- Aedes lasaensis Meng, 1962
- Aedes lepidus Cerqueira and Paraense, 1945
- Aedes leucomelas (Meigen, 1804)
- Aedes linesi Marks, 1964
- Aedes longifilamentus Su and Zhang, 1988
- Aedes luteifemur Edwards, 1926
- Aedes macintoshi Marks, 1959
- Aedes martineti Sevenet, 1937
- Aedes mcdonaldi Belkin, 1962
- Aedes melanimon Dyar, 1924
- Aedes meprai Martínez and Prosen, 1953
- Aedes mercurator Dyar, 1920
- Aedes milleri Dyar, 1922
- Aedes mitchellae (Dyar, 1905)
- Aedes montchadskyi Dubitzky, 1968
- Aedes nevadensis Chapman and Barr, 1964
- Aedes nigrinus (Eckstein, 1918)
- Aedes nigripes (Zetterstedt, 1838)
- Aedes nigrithorax (Macquart, 1847)
- Aedes nigrocanus Martini, 1927
- Aedes nigromaculis (Ludlow, 1906)
- Aedes niphadopsis Dyar and Knab, 1918
- Aedes nivalis Edwards, 1926
- Aedes normanensis (Taylor, 1915)
- Aedes nubilus (Theobald, 1903)
- Aedes obturbator Dyar and Knab, 1907
- Aedes oligopistus Dyar, 1918
- Aedes patersoni Shannon and Del Ponte, 1928
- Aedes pectinatus Arnell, 1976
- Aedes pennai Antunes and Lane, 1938
- Aedes perkinsi Marks, 1949
- Aedes pertinax Grabham, 1906
- Aedes phaecasiatus Marks, 1964
- Aedes phaeonotus Arnell, 1976
- Aedes pionips Dyar, 1919
- Aedes procax (Skuse, 1889)
- Aedes pseudonormanensis Marks, 1949
- Aedes pulcritarsis (Rondani, 1872)
- Aedes pullatus (Coquillett, 1904)
- Aedes punctodes Dyar, 1922
- Aedes punctor (Kirby, 1837)
- Aedes purpuraceus Brug, 1932
- Aedes purpureifemur Marks, 1959
- Aedes purpuriventris Edwards, 1926
- Aedes ratcliffei Marks, 1959
- Aedes raymondi Del Ponte, Castro and García, 1951
- Aedes rempeli Vockeroth, 1954
- Aedes rhyacophilus da Costa Lima, 1933
- Aedes riparioides Su and Zhang, 1987
- Aedes riparius Dyar and Knab, 1907
- Aedes sagax (Skuse, 1889)
- Aedes sallumae González and Reyes in González et al., 2017
- Aedes sapiens Marks, 1964
- Aedes scapularis (Rondani, 1848)
- Aedes schizopinax Dyar, 1929
- Aedes schtakelbergi Shingarev, 1928
- Aedes scutellatum Boshell-Manrique, 1939
- Aedes sedaensis Lei, 1989
- Aedes sergievi Danilov, Markovich and Proskuryakova, 1978
- Aedes serratus (Theobald, 1901)
- Aedes shannoni Vargas and Downs, 1950
- Aedes silvestris (Dobrotworsky, 1961)
- Aedes simanini Gutsevich, 1966
- Aedes sinkiangensis Hsiao, 1977
- Aedes sollicitans (Walker, 1856) saltmarsh mosquito
- Aedes spencerii (Theobald, 1901)
- Aedes spilotus Marks, 1963
- Aedes squamiger (Coquillett, 1902) - California saltmarsh mosquito
- Aedes sticticus (Meigen, 1838) - floodwater mosquito
- Aedes stigmaticus Edwards, 1922
- Aedes stimulans (Walker, 1848) - woodland mosquito
- Aedes stramineus Dubitzky, 1970
- Aedes stricklandi (Edwards, 1912)
- Aedes subalbirostris Klein and Marks, 1960
- Aedes surcoufi (Theobald, 1912)
- Aedes synchytus Arnell, 1976
- Aedes taeniorhynchus (Wiedemann, 1821) - black salt marsh mosquito
- Aedes tahoensis Dyar, 1916
- Aedes thelcter Dyar, 1918
- Aedes theobaldi (Taylor, 1914)
- Aedes thibaulti Dyar and Knab, 1910
- Aedes tormentor Dyar and Knab, 1906
- Aedes tortilis (Theobald, 1903)
- Aedes trivittatus (Coquillett, 1902)
- Aedes turneri Marks, 1963
- Aedes upatensis Anduze and Hecht, 1943
- Aedes ventrovittis Dyar, 1916
- Aedes vigilax (Skuse, 1889)
- Aedes vittiger (Skuse, 1889)
- Aedes washinoi Lanzaro and Eldridge, 1992
