= Aedes hesperonotius =

Scientific classification
- Kingdom: Animalia
- Phylum: Arthropoda
- Clade: Pancrustacea
- Class: Insecta
- Order: Diptera
- Family: Culicidae
- Genus: Aedes
- Subgenus: Ochlerotatus
- Species: A. hesperonotius

Binomial name
- Aedes hesperonotius Marks, 1959

Species of mosquito

Aedes hesperonotius is a species of mosquito belonging to the genus Aedes. Adults are believed to only appear for a brief period between September and October. It is found in southern Western Australia.

== Description ==
The head of A. hesperonotius has narrow golden scales on occiput and frons, some dark on the vertex. Broad flat yellow scales on sides. Proboscis and palps black. Scutum with a dark brown integument.
