= Aedes normanensis =

Scientific classification
- Kingdom: Animalia
- Phylum: Arthropoda
- Class: Insecta
- Order: Diptera
- Family: Culicidae
- Genus: Aedes
- Subgenus: Ochlerotatus
- Species: A. normanensis

Binomial name
- Aedes normanensis (Taylor, 1915)

Synonyms
- Ochlerotatus normanensis

Species of mosquito

Aedes normanensis is a medium-sized species of mosquito in the genus Aedes commonly known as the flood water mosquito. It is named for its type locality of Normanton, Queensland, Australia. It is common in the moderately dry areas of the subtropics and tropics and is widespread in the Northern Territory, as well as being found in Queensland and Northern Western Australia.

== Description ==
The head is grey and black, with some pale scales. The proboscis, palpi, and antennae are also black, and the eyes are a blue-black in colour. Thorax, abdomen and legs are brown with some white bands or spots.

Females are around 4.5 mm in length, while males tend to be 3.5-4 mm.

== Biology ==
A. normanensis breeds at many freshwater breeding sites, from ground pools to swamps. Breeding sites range in conditions, from open to fully shaded, muddy or polluted. This species is known to bite man among other mammals and birds, during the day and evening throughout the year.

It is known to be a vector of numerous arboviruses, including Murray Valley encephalitis, Ross River virus, Barmah Forest virus and Fitzroy River virus.

== Taxonomy ==
Originally described as Culex normanensis by Frank H. Taylor.
