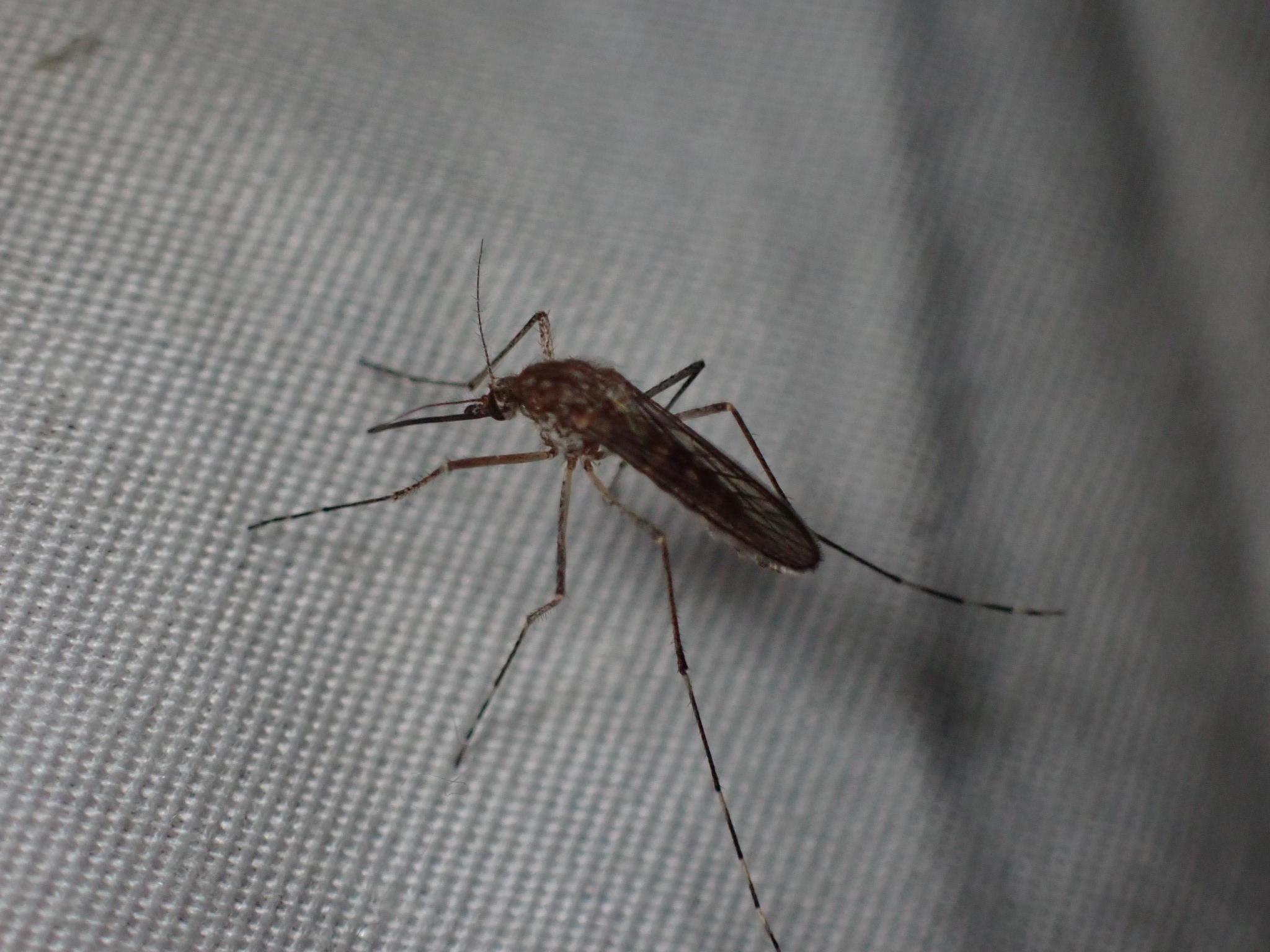

Scientific classification
- Kingdom: Animalia
- Phylum: Arthropoda
- Clade: Pancrustacea
- Class: Insecta
- Order: Diptera
- Family: Culicidae
- Genus: Aedes
- Subgenus: Ochlerotatus
- Species: A. increpitus

Binomial name
- Aedes increpitus (Dyar, 1906)

= Aedes increpitus =

Species of mosquito

Aedes increpitus is a species of mosquito of the Aedes genus.

== Description ==
Genetic and morphological studies have been conducted on A. increpitus to better understand its relationship with other Aedes species. Electrophoretic analysis has been used to identify and differentiate A. increpitus from closely related species such as A. clivis and A. washinoi. Evidence of hybridization between A. increpitus and A. washinoi has been observed in certain locations, including sites near Burney, Lassen County, California, and in Lassen National Park.

== Distribution ==
A. increpitus is mainly found in the United States, but reports also exist from Russia, and other countries.
