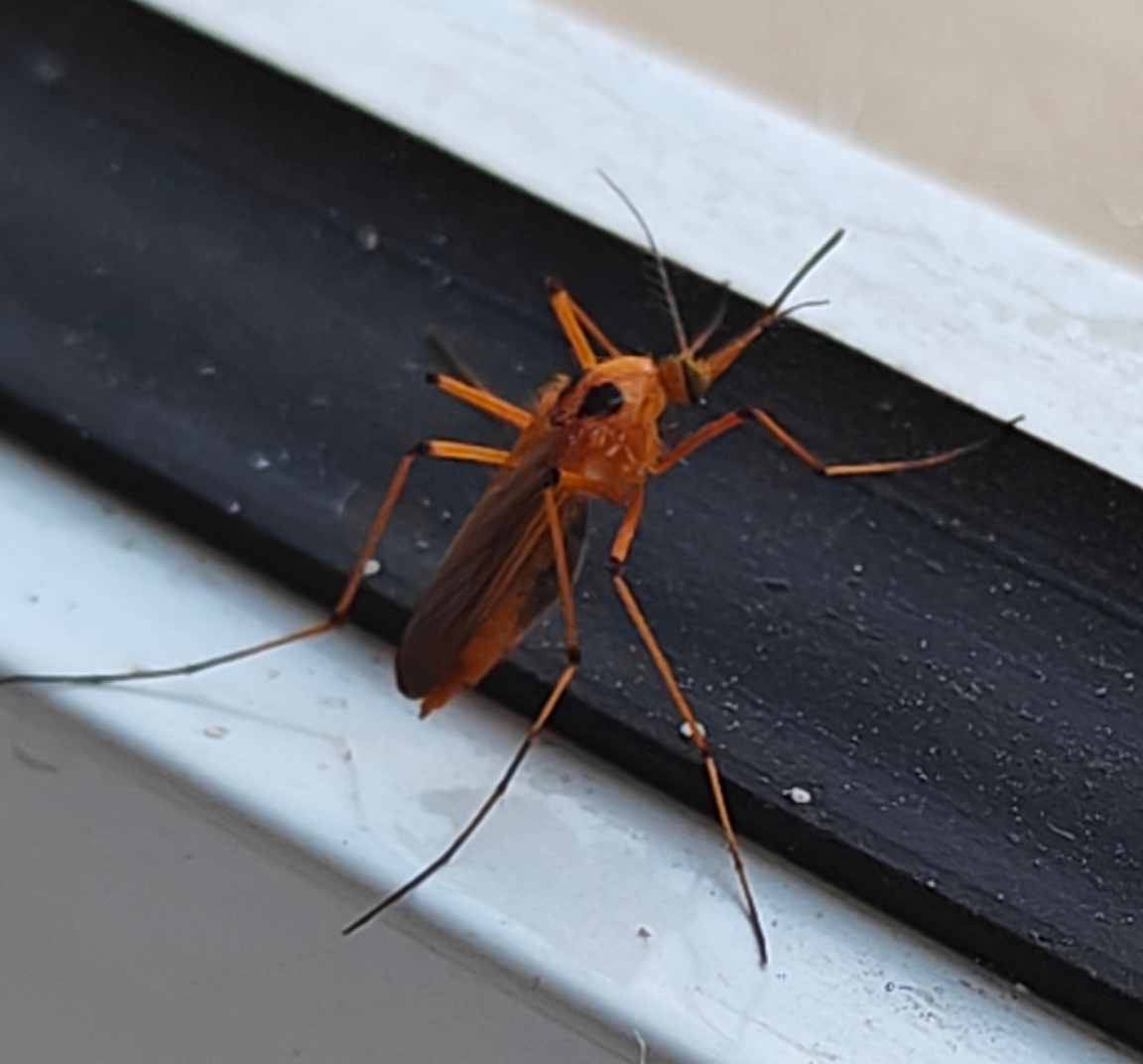

Scientific classification
- Kingdom: Animalia
- Phylum: Arthropoda
- Clade: Pancrustacea
- Class: Insecta
- Order: Diptera
- Family: Culicidae
- Genus: Aedes
- Subgenus: Ochlerotatus
- Species: A. bimaculatus

Binomial name
- Aedes bimaculatus Coquillett, 1902

Synonyms
- Ochlerotatus bimaculatus; Culex bimaculatus; Aedes rozeboomi

= Aedes bimaculatus =

Species of mosquito

Aedes bimaculatus is a species of mosquito in the genus Aedes, belonging to the family Culicidae. It has a yellow and black coloration and has been found in areas ranging from central Texas to southern Mexico and El Salvador..
