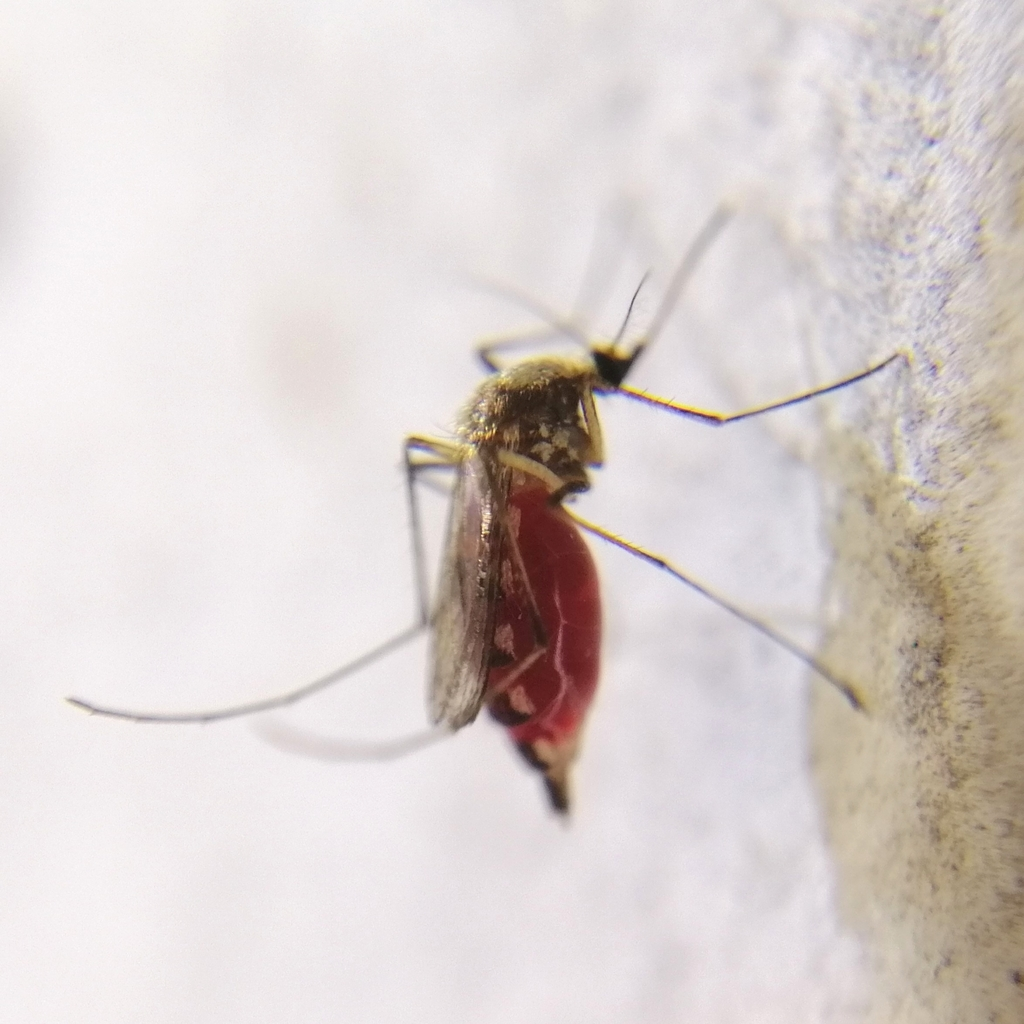

Scientific classification
- Kingdom: Animalia
- Phylum: Arthropoda
- Class: Insecta
- Order: Diptera
- Family: Culicidae
- Genus: Aedes
- Subgenus: Ochlerotatus
- Species: A. scapularis

Binomial name
- Aedes scapularis (Rondani, 1848)

= Aedes scapularis =

Species of mosquito

Aedes scapularis is a species of mosquito primarily found in neo-tropical regions of the Americas.

== Classification ==
Aedes scapularis is one of many species of the genus Aedes. Several Aedes species have been reclassified as Ochlerotatus, with Ae. scapulari sometimes included in this revision.

== Distribution ==
Aedes scapularis has been recorded throughout neo-tropical regions of the western hemisphere. Larval specimens were reported in the Florida Keys in 1945, and in 2020 the species was reported as being endemic in Miami-Dade and Broward counties in Florida.

== Biology ==
Its habitat was originally associated with forest habitats, but it has become urbanized and is now reported breeding in artificial water containers.

Forattini & Gomes 1988 reported that this mosquito showed diurnal and nocturnal activity, but was most active during the evening crepuscular period.

== Medical importance ==
It is known to bite humans and can carry a number of diseases, including yellow fever, Venezuelan equine encephalitis virus, and other human pathogens.

In 2021, authorities in southeastern Florida stated that, although it has become established there, this species of mosquito is not considered a vector of concern for disease in humans nor other animals, as the diseases it can transmit are not endemic to that area.
