= Ochlerotatus cantator =

Scientific classification
- Kingdom: Animalia
- Phylum: Arthropoda
- Class: Insecta
- Order: Diptera
- Family: Culicidae
- Genus: Ochlerotatus
- Species: O. cantator

Binomial name
- Ochlerotatus cantator (Coquillett, 1903)

Species of fly

Ochlerotatus cantator, the brown saltmarsh mosquito, is a species of mosquito from the genus Ochlerotatus. It was formerly known as Aedes cantator. Several Aedes species have been reclassified as Ochlerotatus, O. cantator being one of them.

Its habitat is marshes and pools. They are found in the Maritime Provinces of Canada, New England and the American Mid-Atlantic States. It is the most common species of mosquito in many parts of New Brunswick and Maine.

It bites humans and can carry West Nile virus and Eastern equine encephalitis. It has short, budlike anal gills.
