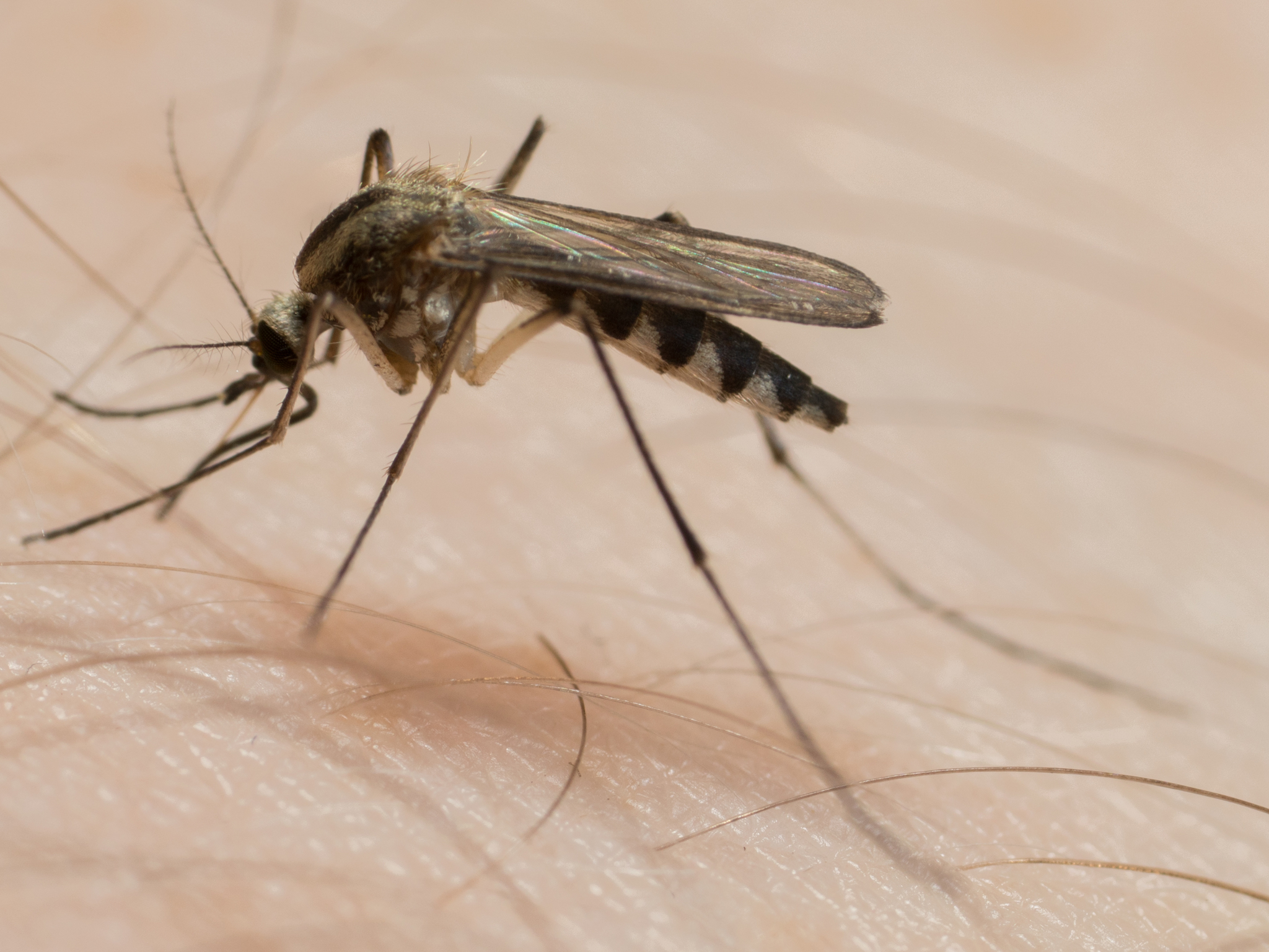

Scientific classification
- Kingdom: Animalia
- Phylum: Arthropoda
- Clade: Pancrustacea
- Class: Insecta
- Order: Diptera
- Family: Culicidae
- Genus: Aedes
- Subgenus: Ochlerotatus
- Species: A. trivittatus

Binomial name
- Aedes trivittatus (Coquillett, 1902)

= Aedes trivittatus =

Species of mosquito

Aedes trivittatus (originally named Ochleratus trivittatus) is a species of mosquito in the genus Aedes commonly referred to as the plains floodwater mosquito. It is a known vector of trivittatus virus and is generally found East of the Rocky Mountains and in places in Mexico and Central America.

== Taxonomy ==
Aedes trivittatus is a mosquito in the genus Aedes, in the tribe Aedini, and in the family Culicidae, which is the dipteran family that encompasses mosquitoes. It was once a member of the genus Ochlerotatus as Ochleratus trivittatus, which was once a subgenus in Aedes. In 2000, phylogenetic analyses reclassified Ochlerotatus as a separate genus from Aedes and Aedes trivittatus was classified in Ochleratus as Ochleratus trivittatus. Ochleratus trivittatus was later renamed to Aedes trivittatus after further phylogenetic work.

== Description ==
Aedes trivittatus is a medium sized mosquito. It is described as having a dark unbanded surface on the dorsum of the abdomen and clear wings with dark-scaled veins. The most unique feature of Aedes trivittatus is the two broad stripes of yellowish-white scales separated by a bronzy-brown or dark strip of scales of about the same size that run down the top of the mesonotum. The abdominal terga are predominantly dark scaled. The sides of the abdomen have basolateral white scale patches. The posterior sides of the tibia and femur have white scales while the hind tarsomeres are dark-scaled and unbanded.

The larva of Aedes trivittatus vary from around 2.4 mm to around 6.6 mm as it grows through its four instar stages. The head of the larvae are more broad than they are long with one eye on each side of its head. There is one antennae on each side of the head and the antennae are slender, slightly taper to the apex, and are less than half as long as the head. The head contains several hairs arranged in different patterns along it. The air siphon or the breathing tube is found on the dorsal side of the eighth abdominal segment. It is cylindrical-shaped with a narrowing towards the apex and has setae. The saddle is found on the ninth abdominal segment and it is narrow, sclerotized, and ovalish in shape. Hairs are found in patterns all throughout the abdomen. These features can vary between different larval instar stages.

The pupa of Aedes trivittatus is similar to other mosquito pupae, having a comma-shaped body. There is a pattern of setae along the body of the pupa.

== Distribution ==
Aedes trivittatus in the United States is found east of the Rocky Mountains up to the Canadian border. However, according to user sightings on iNaturalist, it has also been spotted in Mexico, Central America, and a few times in South America. iNaturalist data is based on user sightings and data, meaning it is not 100% accurate. These sightings should not be taken as entirely true but should be taken as a suggestion as to the potential range of Aedes trivittatus.

== Habitat ==
Aedes trivittatus lays eggs in a variety of freshwater habitats. These can include marshes, pools, containers with standing water, flooded woodlands, or in moist soil patches that are prone to flooding. The common name "plains floodwater mosquito" is in reference to how mosquitoes will emerge from recently flooded areas as a result of adult females laying eggs on areas prone to flooding. It is unclear if Aedes trivittatus has a preference for one kind of environment.

== Life history ==
Aedes trivittatus shares a similar life cycle to other Aedes mosquitoes. Gravid adult mosquitoes will lay eggs in a variety of freshwater habitats. Aedes eggs are able to survive desiccation for up to 8 months. These eggs will then hatch into mosquito larvae, which will continue to feed and grow. A larva will then grow into a pupa, which does not feed. The adult mosquito will emerge from the pupa and fly away.

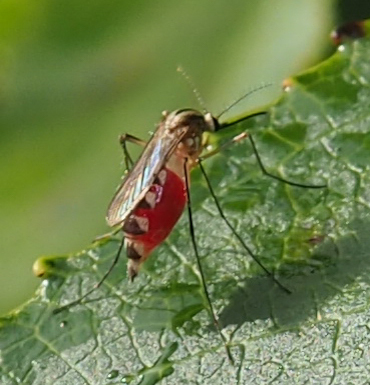
Aedes trivittatus that recently fed on blood

Typically, male mosquitoes will emerge before female mosquitoes, where they will swarm above the water waiting for females to emerge from their pupae. Once the females emerge, the males will mate with the females. Both male and female mosquitoes feed on nectar and other sugars for nutrition. The adult female bite mammals to get blood, which they require to produce eggs. They seem to opportunistically bite a variety of mammals, including rabbits, raccoons, humans, and many others. Once females reach maturity, they can then lay eggs in freshwater habitats.

Developing time is very variable depending on environmental conditions. Hot daytime temperatures and warm nighttime temperatures can allow mosquitoes to develop from egg to adult in 5 days. It is unclear what the ideal developmental conditions or how quickly Aedes trivittatus can fully develop from egg to adult.

== Medical importance ==
Aedes trivittatus has been shown to carry and be a primary vector of trivittatus virus. It is currently unclear whether or not trivittatus virus can infect people and what symptoms of infection are but trivittatus virus has been documented to be able to infect many mammals like rabbits, squirrels, and opossums. An orbivirus, Skunk River Virus, was also isolated from Aedes trivittatus though it is unclear if this disease infects humans. It is also unclear whether or not Aedes trivittatus is a vector for other diseases like dengue fever or chikungunya that other Aedes mosquitoes transmit. More research is needed on the diseases that Aedes trivittatus can vector to fully understand their medical importance.
