= Aedes macintoshi =

Scientific classification
- Kingdom: Animalia
- Phylum: Arthropoda
- Class: Insecta
- Order: Diptera
- Family: Culicidae
- Genus: Aedes
- Subgenus: Ochlerotatus
- Species: A. macintoshi

Binomial name
- Aedes macintoshi Marks, 1959

Species of mosquito

Aedes macintoshi or is a large species of mosquito in the genus Aedes. It is uncommon and found in southwestern Australia. Larvae are found in fresh, clear water with shallow reeds and grass.

== Description ==
Scutum reddish brown and broad pale lateral bands, bronze medially. Scutellum pale. Pleura with scattered pale scales, broad scaling on propleuron. Abdominal tergites dark with round median basal patches and lateral basal patches.
