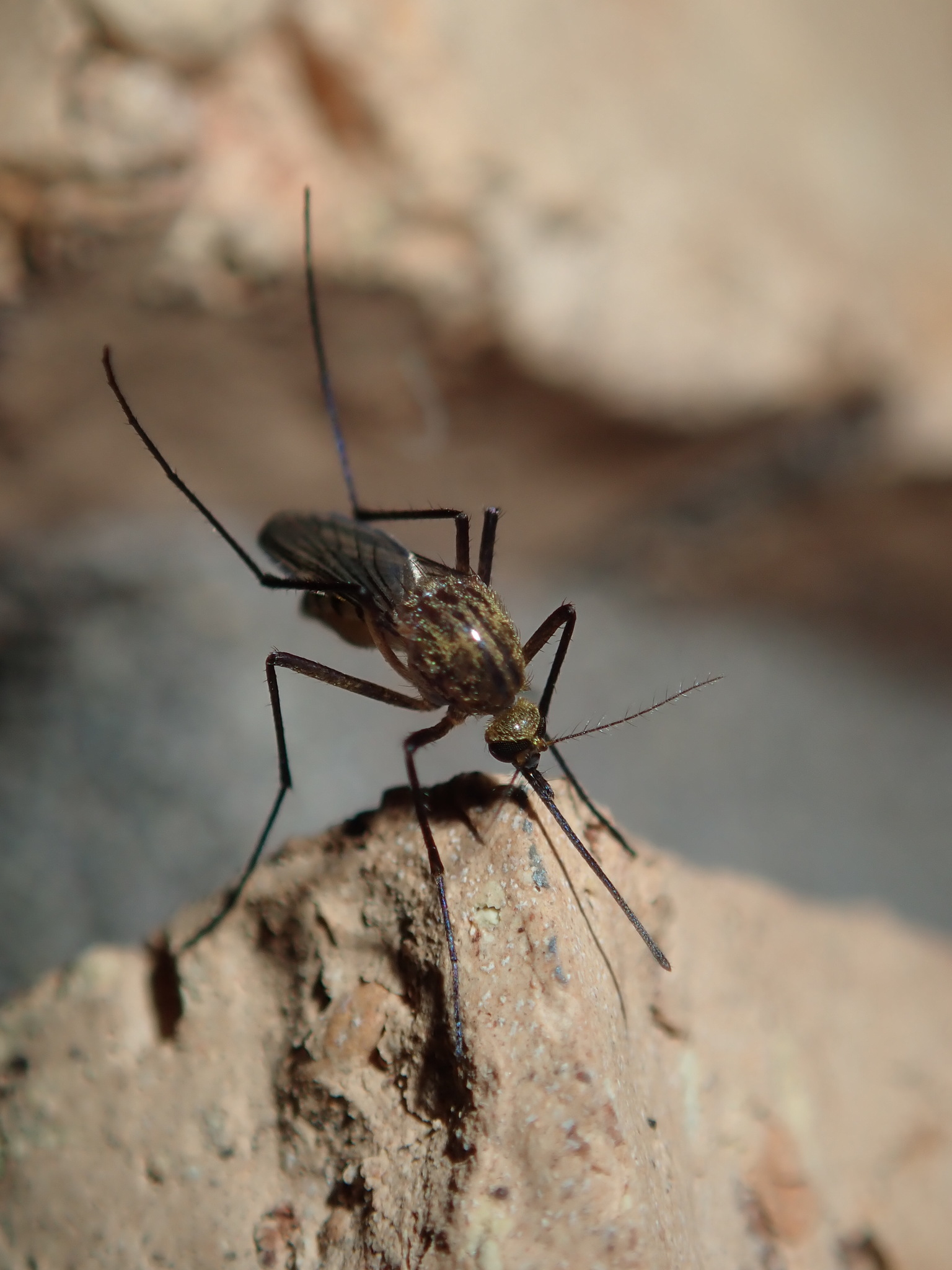

Scientific classification
- Domain: Eukaryota
- Kingdom: Animalia
- Phylum: Arthropoda
- Class: Insecta
- Order: Diptera
- Family: Culicidae
- Genus: Aedes
- Subgenus: Ochlerotatus
- Species: A. imperfectus

Binomial name
- Aedes imperfectus Dobrotworsky, 1962

= Aedes imperfectus =

Species of mosquito

Aedes imperfectus is a species of mosquito belonging to the genus Aedes. Its geographic distribution and detailed biology are not yet well documented, but has been reported in Australia, particularly in tea-tree swamps in northern Tasmania.

== Life cycle ==
The lifecycle of mosquitoes in the Aedes genus.

Aedes imperfectus, like other Aedes mosquitoes, has a complex life cycle consisting of four stages: egg, larva, pupa, and adult. The entire cycle from egg to adult typically takes about 7-10 days, depending on environmental conditions.
