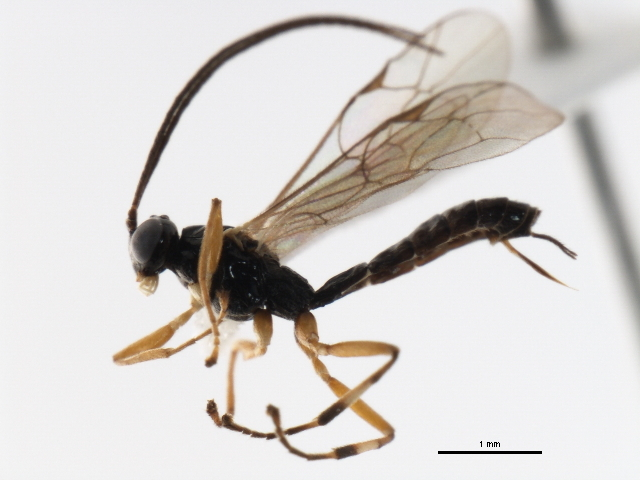
- Acrodactyla quadrisculpta

Scientific classification
- Domain: Eukaryota
- Kingdom: Animalia
- Phylum: Arthropoda
- Class: Insecta
- Order: Hymenoptera
- Family: Ichneumonidae
- Tribe: Ephialtini
- Genus: Acrodactyla; Haliday, 1839

= Acrodactyla =

Genus of wasps

Acrodactyla is a genus of insect belonging to the family Ichneumonidae.

The genus was first described by Haliday in 1839.

The genus has cosmopolitan distribution.

Species:

- Acrodactyla aequaria Momoi, 1966
- Acrodactyla carinator (Aubert, 1965)
- Acrodactyla degener (Haliday, 1838)
- Acrodactyla lydia Kasparyan, 1979
- Acrodactyla quadrisculpta (Gravenhorst, 1820)
- Acrodactyla takewakii (Uchida, 1927)
