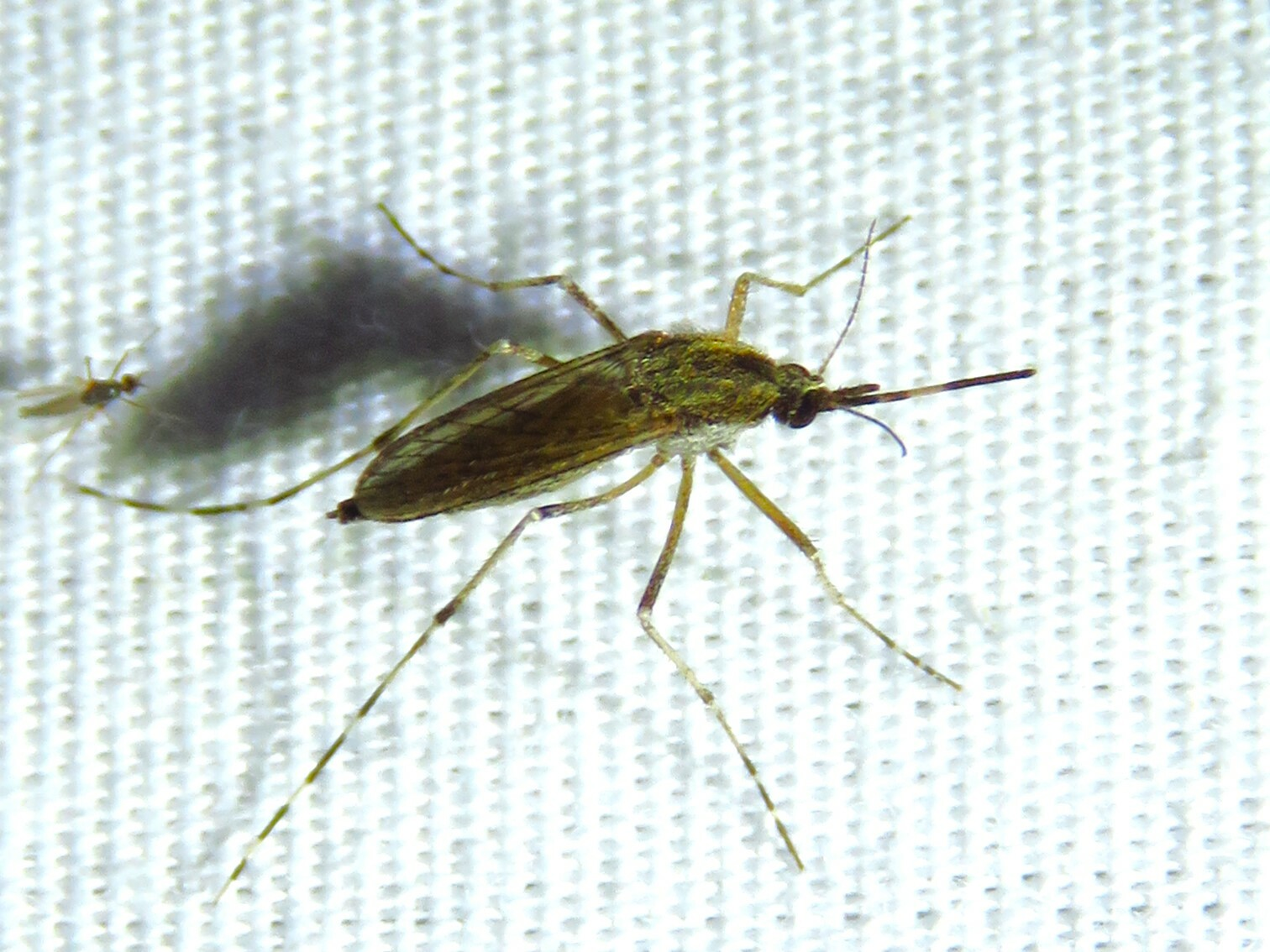

Scientific classification
- Kingdom: Animalia
- Phylum: Arthropoda
- Class: Insecta
- Order: Diptera
- Family: Culicidae
- Genus: Aedes
- Subgenus: Ochlerotatus
- Species: A. nigromaculis

Binomial name
- Aedes nigromaculis (Ludlow, 1906)

Synonyms
- Grabhamia nigromaculis Ludlow, 1906

= Aedes nigromaculis =

Species of mosquito

Aedes nigromaculis, commonly known as the irrigated pasture mosquito, is a mosquito species in the genus Aedes, subgenus Ochlerotatus, and family Culicidae.

== Distribution ==
Aedes nigromaculis has been documented in the western United States, including California, and in Canada, in the Northwest Territories.

== Behavior and ecology ==
The larvae often cluster along grassy edges.

== Medical significance ==
It has been demonstrated to be able to transmit Western equine encephalitis virus (WEE), St. Louis Encephalitis (SLE) virus, and Japanese encephalitis virus in laboratory settings. Natural infections of WEE virus have been confirmed in wild populations.
