= Aedes cacozelus =

Scientific classification
- Kingdom: Animalia
- Phylum: Arthropoda
- Class: Insecta
- Order: Diptera
- Family: Culicidae
- Genus: Aedes
- Subgenus: Ochlerotatus
- Species: A. cacozelus

Binomial name
- Aedes cacozelus Marks, 1963

Species of mosquito

Aedes cacozelus is a species of mosquito in the genus Aedes. It is a rare and large mosquito only known from south-west Western Australia and the type locality of Darkan.

The binomial name of A. cacozelus means 'a bad imitator', and refers to its partial resemblance of A. stricklandi.

== Description ==
The female holotype for A. cacozelus has wings of 4.9 mm in length. The head has a black integument with bronzy brown scales behind the eyes and laterally-flat white scales. Scutal scales are also a dark bronzy brown, scattered with white patches. Mottling on the wings and legs, all femora have white kneespots.

No males or larvae were discovered.
