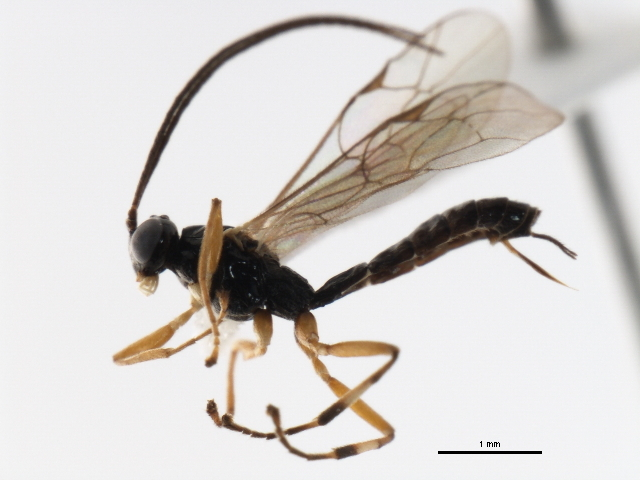

Scientific classification
- Domain: Eukaryota
- Kingdom: Animalia
- Phylum: Arthropoda
- Class: Insecta
- Order: Hymenoptera
- Family: Ichneumonidae
- Genus: Acrodactyla
- Species: A. quadrisculpta

Binomial name
- Acrodactyla quadrisculpta (Gravenhorst, 1820)

= Acrodactyla quadrisculpta =

Species of wasp

Acrodactyla quadrisculpta is a species of parasitoid wasp belonging to the family Ichneumonidae.

It is native to Europe and Northern America. Its host species is Tetragnatha montana, and the final instar of this wasp alters the spider's web-building behavior.
