= Aedes clelandi =

Scientific classification
- Kingdom: Animalia
- Phylum: Arthropoda
- Class: Insecta
- Order: Diptera
- Family: Culicidae
- Genus: Aedes
- Subgenus: Ochlerotatus
- Species: A. clelandi

Binomial name
- Aedes clelandi (Taylor, 1914)

Species of mosquito

Aedes clelandi is a moderately sized species of mosquito in the genus Aedes. Larvae are found in open fresh clear water without vegetation, pools with grass and algae, and flooded rabbit burrows. Adults are known to bite humans during the day, generally between April and October. It is found in Western Australia and Flinders Island.

A. clelandi is regarded as an unlikely vector of myxomatosis.

== Description ==
The head is black and has yellow and white scales dorsally. While the thorax is clothed with narrow golden scales, it is described to be a bright chestnut brown and a pale red-brown integument on the scutum. The abdomen is covered by violet-black scales with white basal banding. Similarly, the legs are black scaled with white banding. Overall, the mosquito is 6-6.5mm in length.
