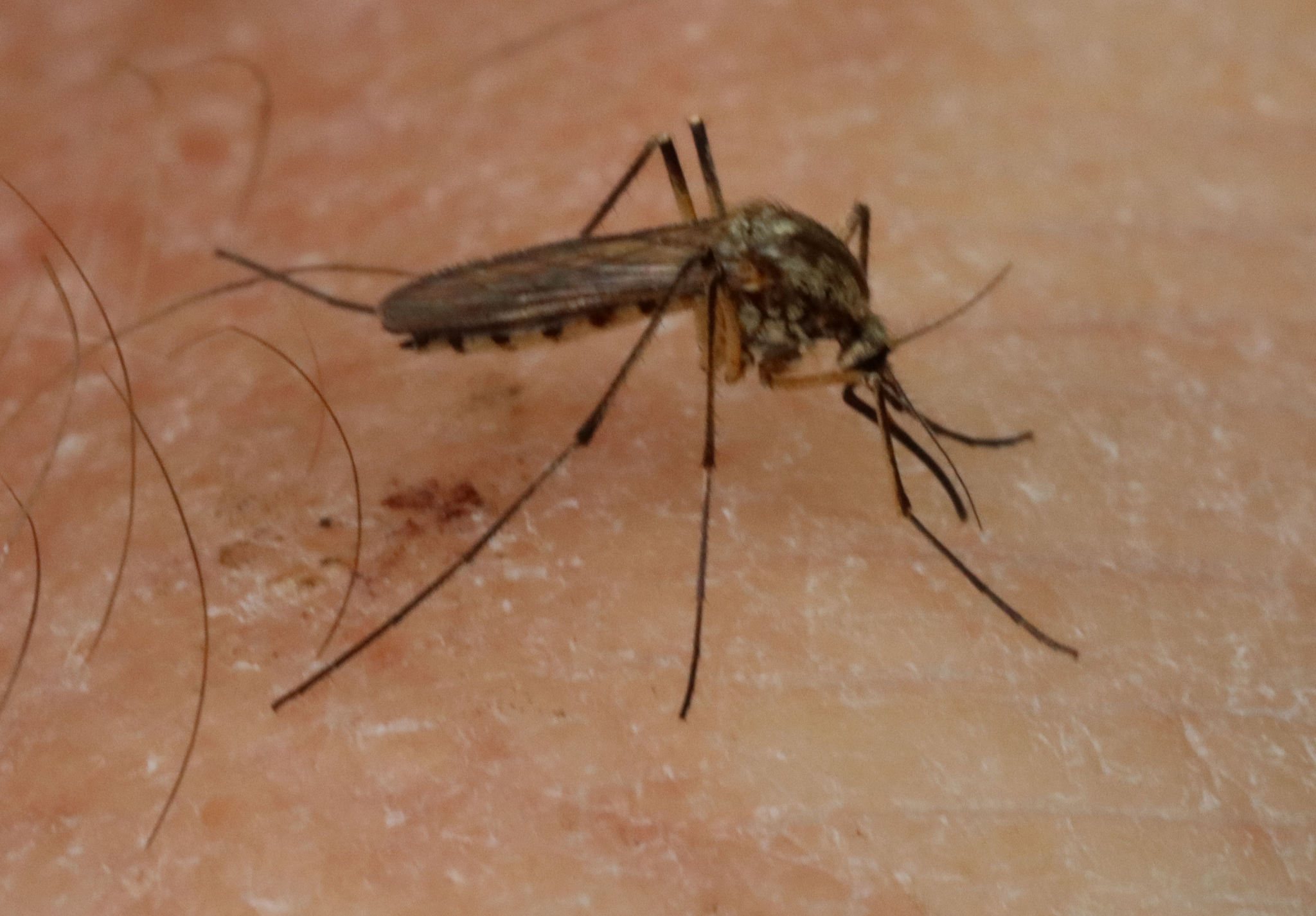

Scientific classification
- Kingdom: Animalia
- Phylum: Arthropoda
- Clade: Pancrustacea
- Class: Insecta
- Order: Diptera
- Family: Culicidae
- Genus: Aedes
- Subgenus: Ochlerotatus
- Species: A. sticticus

Binomial name
- Aedes sticticus (Meigen, 1838)

Synonyms
- Aedes aldrichi Dyar and Knab, 1908; Aedes gonimus Dyar and Knab, 1918; Aedes vinnipegensis Dyar, 1919; Culex aestivalis Dyar, 1904; Culex hirsuteron Theobald, 1901; Culex pretans Grossbeck, 1904; Culex sticticus Meigen, 1838; Ochlerotatus sticticus (Meigen, 1838)

= Aedes sticticus =

Species of mosquito

Aedes sticticus is an uncommon mosquito, although the species can be abundant along river floodlands. It has been known to be responsible for human bites. Like all mosquitoes, it is only the females that bite.

== Distribution ==
Aedes sticticus has a very patchy but wide distribution in temperate parts of Europe, Asia and North America. It has an episodic and patchy distribution in Iowa and Wisconsin.

== Life cycle ==
Not a huge amount is known of its life cycle. It is believed that they overwinter in the egg stage.
