= Aedes hodgkini =

Scientific classification
- Kingdom: Animalia
- Phylum: Arthropoda
- Clade: Pancrustacea
- Class: Insecta
- Order: Diptera
- Family: Culicidae
- Genus: Aedes
- Subgenus: Ochlerotatus
- Species: A. hodgkini

Binomial name
- Aedes hodgkini Marks, 1959

Species of mosquito

Aedes hodgkini is a species of mosquito in the genus Aedes which is found in southern Western Australia. Larvae are found in fresh, clear pools. The species is uncommon and appears to have a restricted seasonal distribution.

== Description ==
A. hodgkini is a moderately sized species, its head with narrow and pale decumbent scales. Scales on the sides are broad and pale, and both the palps and the proboscis are black. The scutum is a reddish brown, with an irregular lateral stripe of yellowish white scaling. Scutellum with long narrow pale scales on all lobes. Abdomen and parts of the legs have basal banding.
