= Aedes eidsvoldensis =

Scientific classification
- Kingdom: Animalia
- Phylum: Arthropoda
- Class: Insecta
- Order: Diptera
- Family: Culicidae
- Genus: Aedes
- Subgenus: Ochlerotatus
- Species: A. eidsvoldensis

Binomial name
- Aedes eidsvoldensis Mackerras, 1927

Species of mosquito

Aedes eidsvoldensis is a species of mosquito in the genus Aedes. Larvae are found in ground pools, and adults bite humans readily. They can be pests in arid regions.

A. eidsvoldensis may be capable of supporting the replication of MVEv, but it is unknown to be a vector.

== Description ==
The head is narrow with golden scales on the vertex, dark scales on the sides. Wings have narrow pale scales, and the abdomen has small creamy gold scales with basal white bands.

== Taxonomy ==
A. eidsvoldensis was described originally as a form of Aedes theobaldi, and was referred to as possibly being a distinct species, but due to its closeness to A. theobaldi and the fact that there was only one specimen Mackerras described it as a form.
