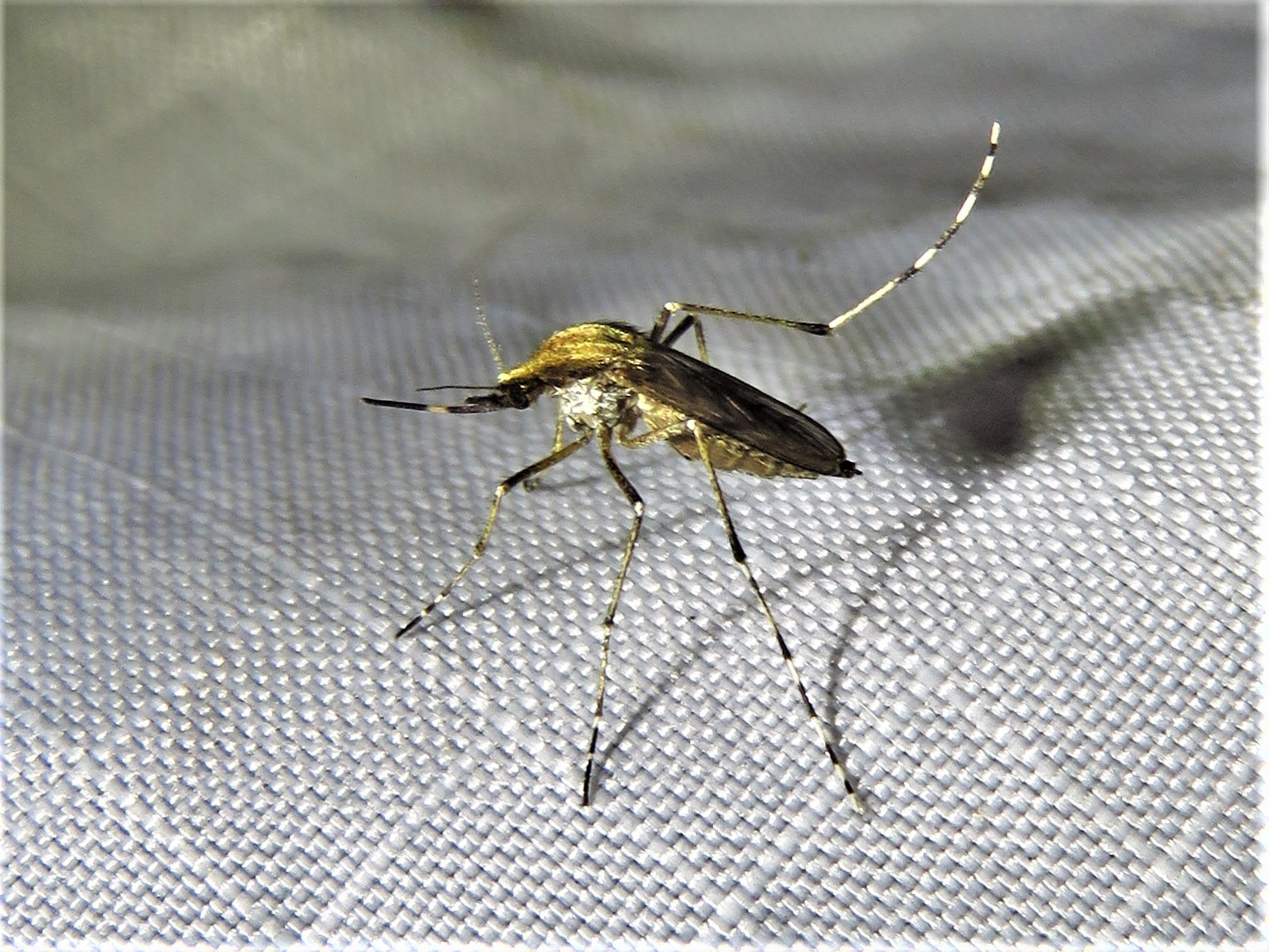

Scientific classification
- Kingdom: Animalia
- Phylum: Arthropoda
- Class: Insecta
- Order: Diptera
- Family: Culicidae
- Genus: Aedes
- Subgenus: Ochlerotatus
- Species: A. mitchellae

Binomial name
- Aedes mitchellae Dyar, 1905

= Aedes mitchellae =

Mosquito in the family Culicidae

Aedes mitchellae mosquitoes were originally collected in southern Georgia and Florida in 1905 by entomologist Harrison Gray Dyar, Jr. The species' range extends through the coastal plains from the southeastern United States, north to New York and west to New Mexico with the greatest abundance in the Atlantic and Gulf coastal plains.

== Bionomics ==
The adults, which resemble Aedes sollicitans, are frequently captured in light traps. Adult females have been characterized as "severe biters", implying significance as a potential vector of arboviral diseases.

Larvae develop in fresh water in temporary rain-filled pools such as recently dug holes, puddles, temporary pools, and ditches, sometimes with emergent vegetation. In the extreme south they are reportedly found throughout the year following rains.

== Medical importance ==
Aedes mitchellae is a suspected vector of Tensaw virus and secondary vector of Eastern equine encephalitis.
