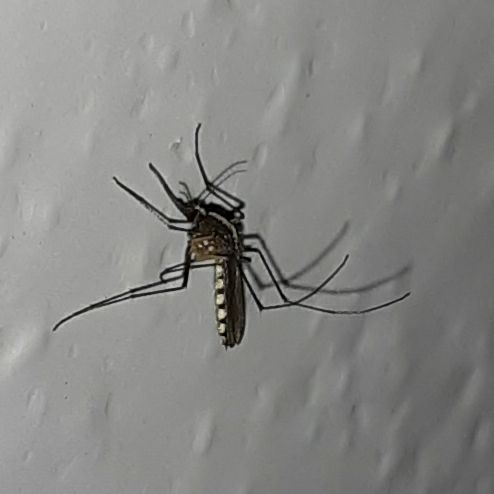

Scientific classification
- Domain: Eukaryota
- Kingdom: Animalia
- Phylum: Arthropoda
- Class: Insecta
- Order: Diptera
- Family: Culicidae
- Genus: Aedes
- Subgenus: Ochlerotatus
- Species: A. atlanticus

Binomial name
- Aedes atlanticus Dyar and Knab, 1906

= Aedes atlanticus =

Species of mosquito

Aedes atlanticus is a species of mosquito native to the southeastern United States. It is known for carrying a number of pathogens that can infect humans, most notably yellow fever.

== Description ==
Aedes atlanticus is a medium-sized mosquito with prominent white stripes on its abdomen. The females of this species are pestiferous, like their aptly named close cousin Aedes tormentor. In addition to being a vector of yellow fever, the mosquito can carry the Keystone virus, which is common in small animals in Florida, and may be common among humans with only minor symptoms, though only two cases have been verified, as of June 2018.

Aedes atlanticus mosquitoes are widespread and common in the southeast US, from Texas and southern Missouri all the way through Maryland. Their reproductive cycle can carry some viruses transstadially through the different stages of the insect's life: a female mosquito may lay eggs carrying the virus, which hatch into infected larvae, eventually maturing into adults that can infect mammals while injecting their anti-coagulant saliva during a bite.
