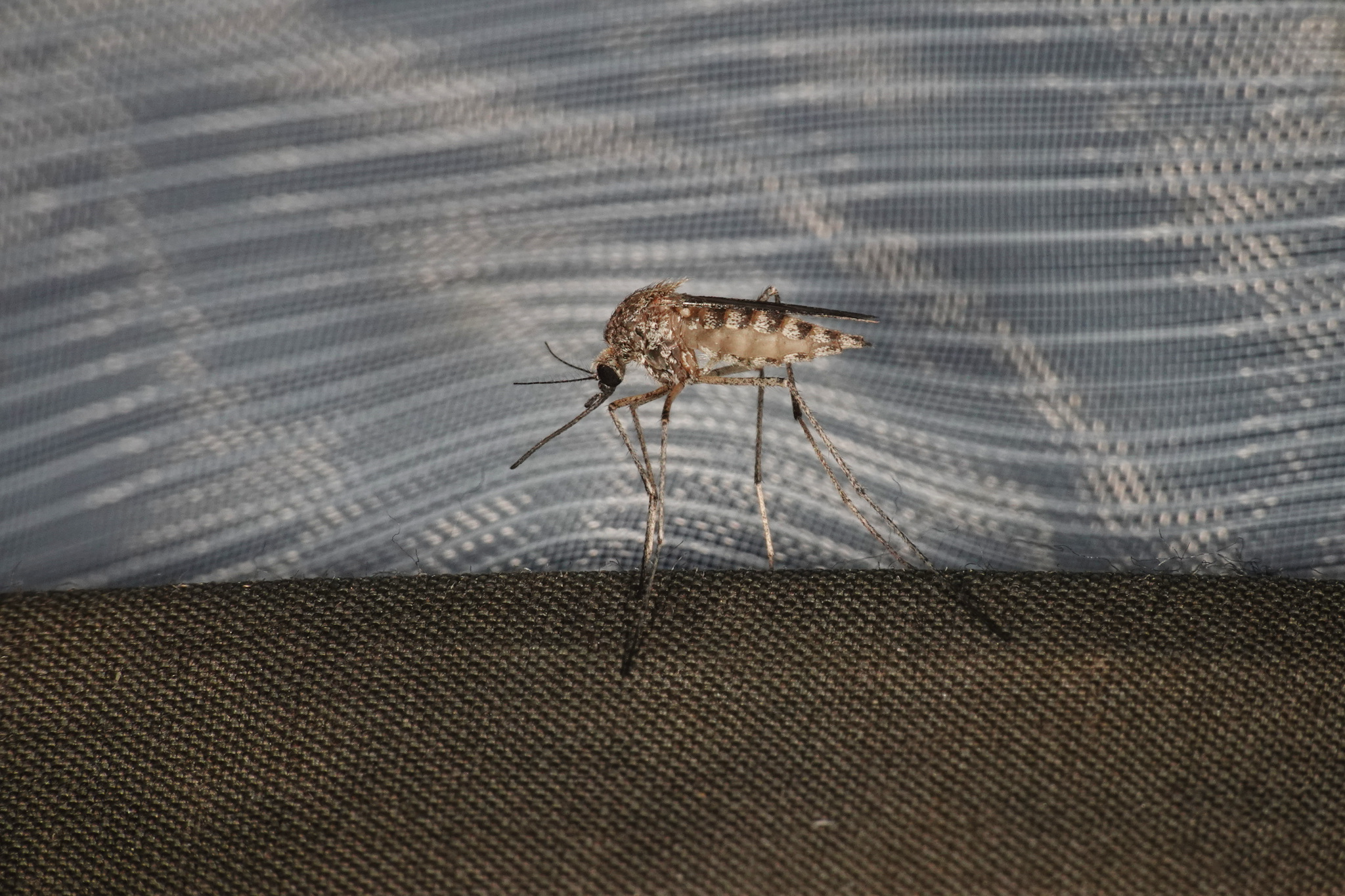

Scientific classification
- Kingdom: Animalia
- Phylum: Arthropoda
- Class: Insecta
- Order: Diptera
- Family: Culicidae
- Genus: Aedes
- Subgenus: Ochlerotatus
- Species: A. sagax

Binomial name
- Aedes sagax (Skuse, 1889)

= Aedes sagax =

Species of mosquito

Aedes sagax is a large mosquito species of the genus Aedes. It is known to breed in fresh, clear water with or without vegetation. It is active in summer and spring, while larvae can be found through the winter as well. Adults feed on humans and domestic animals.

It can be a major pest after floods, and is known to spread Ross River virus.

== Description ==
The head of A. sagax is a golden-brown behind, white on the occiput. Broad, pale scales on either side. Torus pale white above, clypeus bare, proboscis dark scaled, and palps dark with mottling at the base. The palps in females are about 0.2x the length of the proboscis. Scutal integument black; clothed in narrow gold-bronze scales. Scutellum whitish. Abdomenal tergites are dark scaled with some pale scatterings and pale basal banding. Wings dark, tibiae mottled, and tarsi dark also.

== Distribution ==
Aedes sagax is distributed throughout Australia, its type locality being in New South Wales.
