= Anopheles atropos =

Scientific classification
- Kingdom: Animalia
- Phylum: Arthropoda
- Class: Insecta
- Order: Diptera
- Family: Culicidae
- Genus: Anopheles
- Subgenus: Anopheles
- Species: A. atropos

Binomial name
- Anopheles atropos Dyar & Knab, 1906

Synonyms
- Anopheles ferruginosus Wiedemann, 1828

Species of mosquito

Anopheles atropos is a species of mosquito in the family Culicidae.
