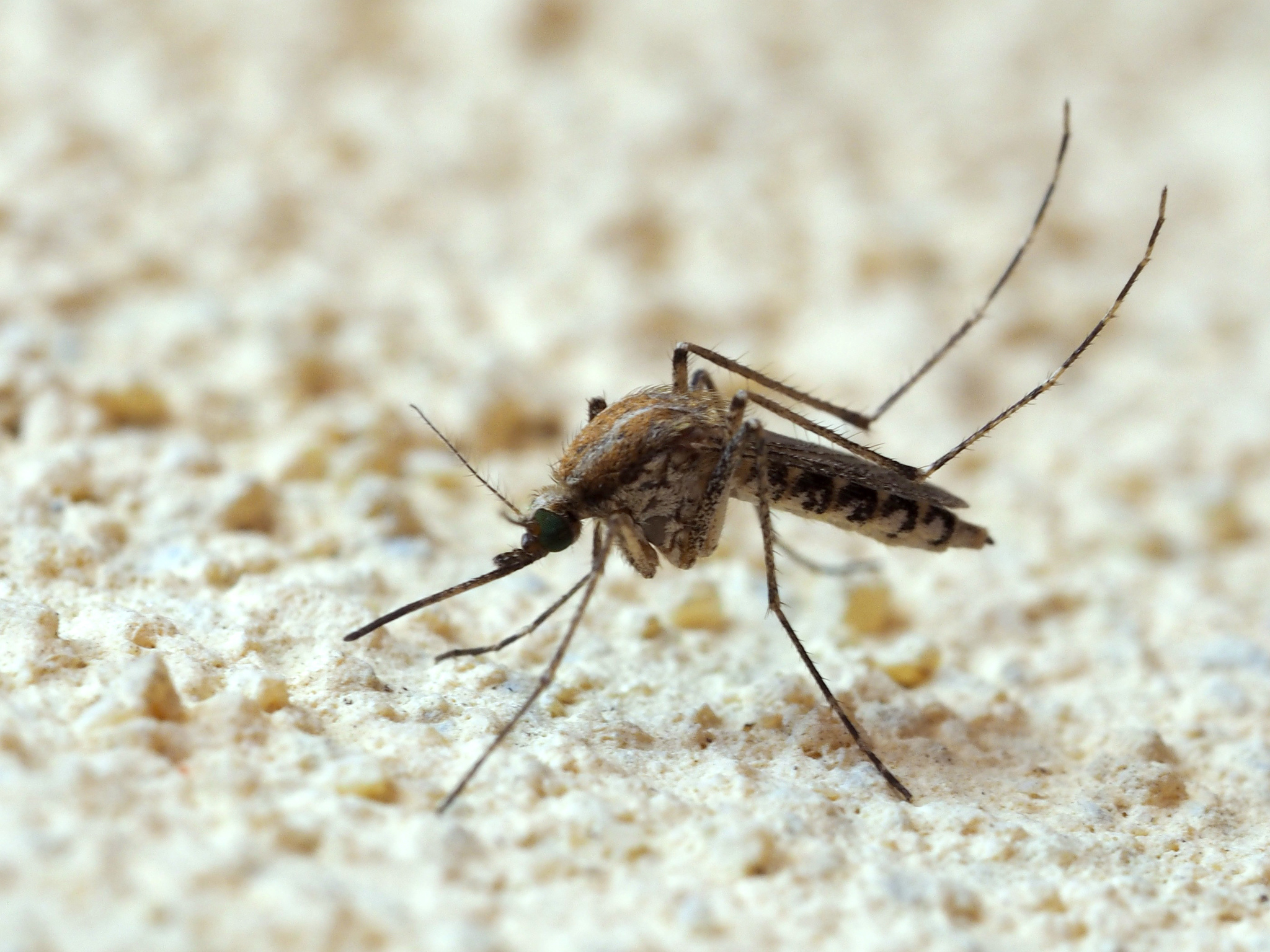

Scientific classification
- Kingdom: Animalia
- Phylum: Arthropoda
- Clade: Pancrustacea
- Class: Insecta
- Order: Diptera
- Family: Culicidae
- Genus: Aedes
- Subgenus: Ochlerotatus
- Species: A. caspius

Binomial name
- Aedes caspius (Pallas, 1771)

= Aedes caspius =

Species of mosquito

Aedes caspius is a species of mosquito distributed throughout Europe, North Africa and parts of the Middle East, particularly surrounding the Mediterranean Sea. It inhabits salty wetlands such as coastal floodplains. The species is a vector of Tahyna virus in Europe.
