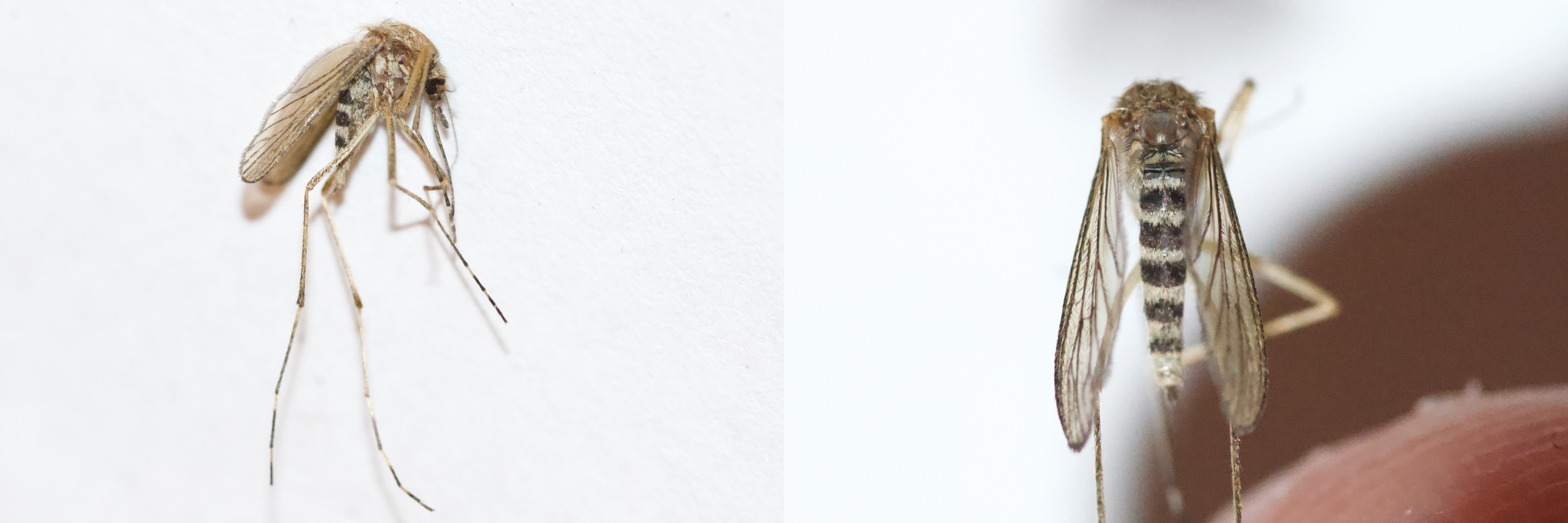

Scientific classification
- Kingdom: Animalia
- Phylum: Arthropoda
- Clade: Pancrustacea
- Class: Insecta
- Order: Diptera
- Family: Culicidae
- Genus: Aedes
- Subgenus: Ochlerotatus
- Species: A. stimulans

Binomial name
- Aedes stimulans (Walker, 1848)

Synonyms
- Aedes classicus Dyar, 1920; Aedes mississippii Dyar, 1920; Culex stimulans Walker, 1848; Culicada subcantans Felt, 1905; Ochlerotatus stimulans (Walker, 1848)

= Aedes stimulans =

Species of mosquito

Aedes stimulans, the woodland mosquito, is a species of mosquito in the genus Aedes.
