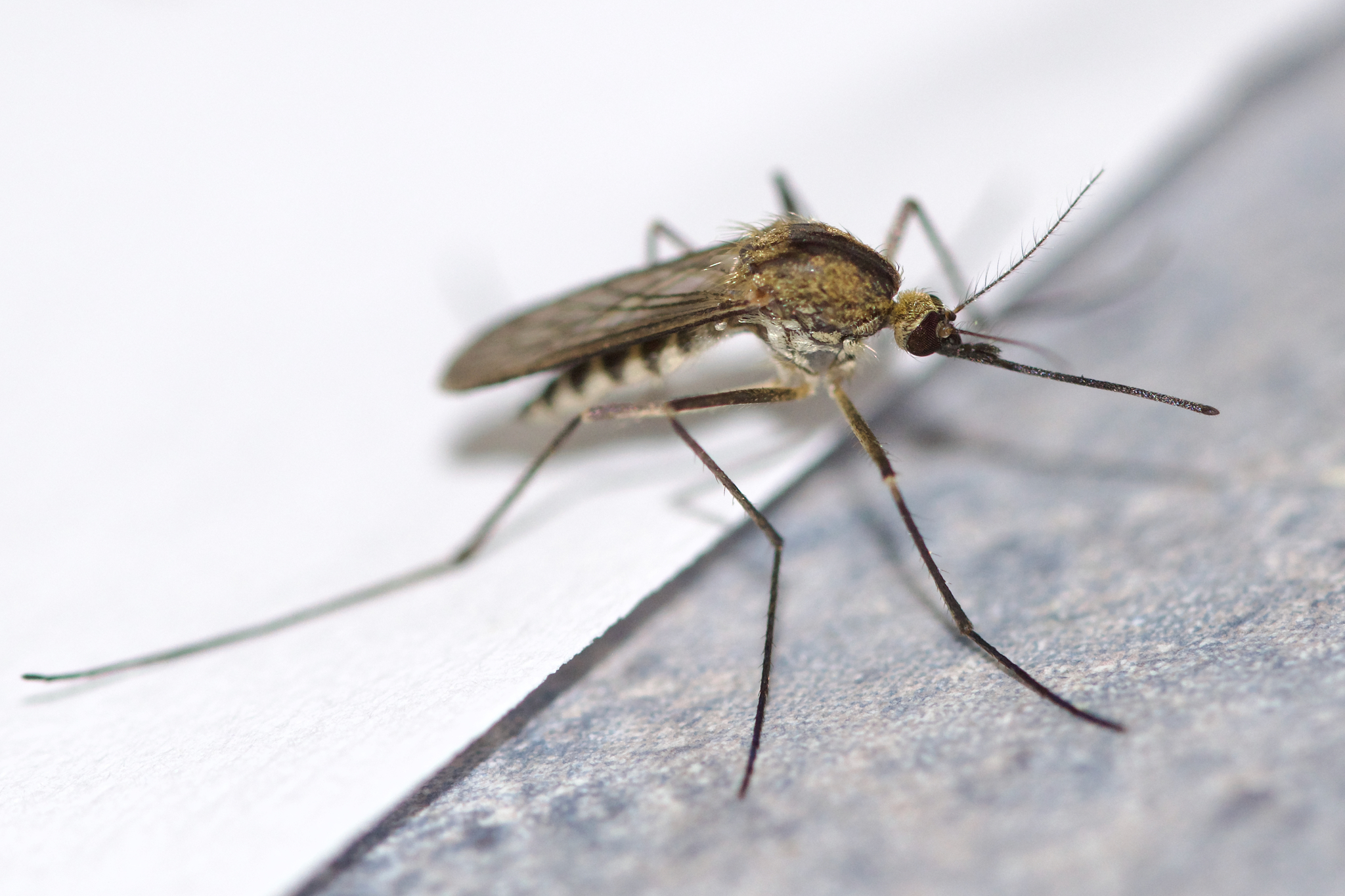

Scientific classification
- Kingdom: Animalia
- Phylum: Arthropoda
- Class: Insecta
- Order: Diptera
- Family: Culicidae
- Genus: Aedes
- Subgenus: Ochlerotatus
- Species: A. punctor

Binomial name
- Aedes punctor (Kirby, 1837)

= Aedes punctor =

Species of mosquito

Aedes punctor is a species of mosquito belonging to the genus Aedes. It is commonly known as the woodland mosquito or the punctor mosquito.

== Description ==
Aedes punctor, like other Aedes species, has distinctive black and white markings on its body and legs. It is a daytime biter, with peak biting periods occurring early in the morning and in the evening before dusk.

== Distribution ==
This species is typically associated with woodland areas, hence its common name. It is widely distributed across temperate regions, including parts of Europe and North America.

== Medical importance ==
Aedes punctor has been identified as a potential vector for certain arboviruses. Research has shown that it can transmit Batai virus, which is known to cause mild febrile illness in humans.
