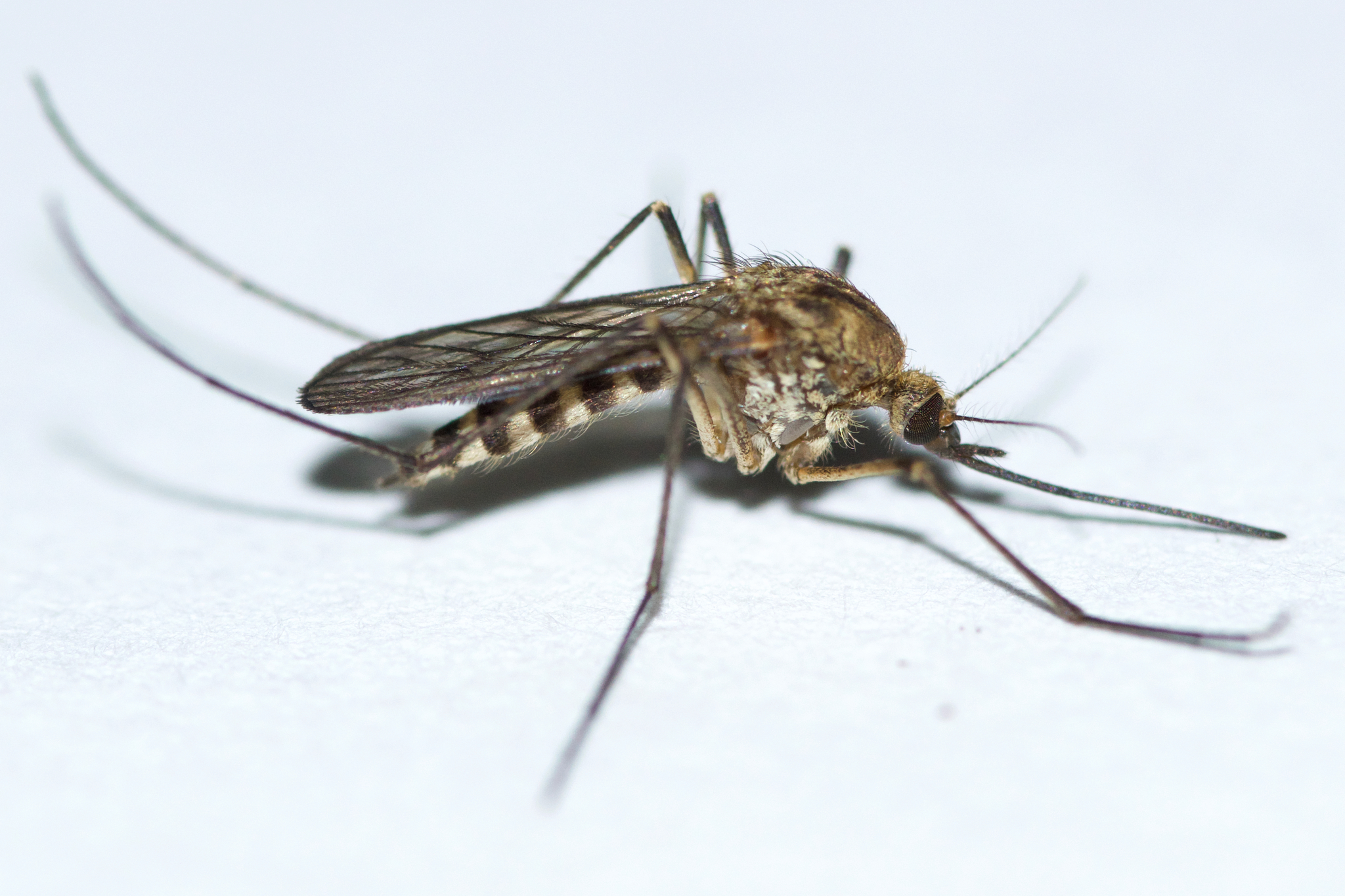

Scientific classification
- Kingdom: Animalia
- Phylum: Arthropoda
- Class: Insecta
- Order: Diptera
- Family: Culicidae
- Genus: Aedes
- Subgenus: Ochlerotatus
- Species: A. communis

Binomial name
- Aedes communis (De Geer, 1776)

= Aedes communis =

Species of mosquito

Aedes communis, also known as the woodland snow pool mosquito, is a species of mosquito in the genus Aedes. It is common in New Jersey but can also be found in the Northern United States, Canada and Alaska. It is a known pollinator of Platanthera obtusata. Unlike other mosquito species, Aedes communis remains active during the winter.
