= Keystone virus =

Virus classification
- (unranked): Virus
- Realm: Riboviria
- Kingdom: Orthornavirae
- Phylum: Negarnaviricota
- Class: Bunyaviricetes
- Order: Elliovirales
- Family: Peribunyaviridae
- Genus: Orthobunyavirus
- Species: Orthobunyavirus keystoneense

Synonyms
- Keystone orthobunyavirus

Species of virus

Keystone virus (Orthobunyavirus keystoneense) is a mosquito-borne virus which can infect mammals. It was first discovered in animals in the Florida area, where it is spread in part by local species of Aedes mosquitoes. In 1964, a case of human infection, producing minor symptoms of a rash and fever, was circumstantially diagnosed. Conclusive laboratory demonstration of the virus in humans was first obtained and reported in 2018.

== The virus ==
The Keystone virus was first discovered in mosquitoes in the Keystone area of Tampa, Florida in 1964, based on antigenic evidence from specimens caught in 1963. The virus has been subsequently observed along the eastern and southern coastline of the United States, from Boston through Texas. In small mammals it can produce symptoms of encephalitis. Infection in humans is believed to be widespread, based on a 1972 report detecting Keystone virus antibodies in 19–21 percent of the people tested in the Tampa Bay region.

The first laboratory isolation of the virus from a human case occurred in Florida in 2016, and was reported in 2018. Identification took almost two years after the case actually occurred, when blood samples taken from the subject in 2016 were analyzed retrospectively by researchers studying the incidence of Zika virus in the Florida population.

The Aedes atlanticus mosquito is a demonstrated vector. The virus transmits transovarially and transstadially through the different stages of the insect's life: A female mosquito may lay eggs carrying the virus, which hatch into infected larvae, eventually maturing into adults that can infect mammals while injecting their anti-coagulant saliva during a bite.
