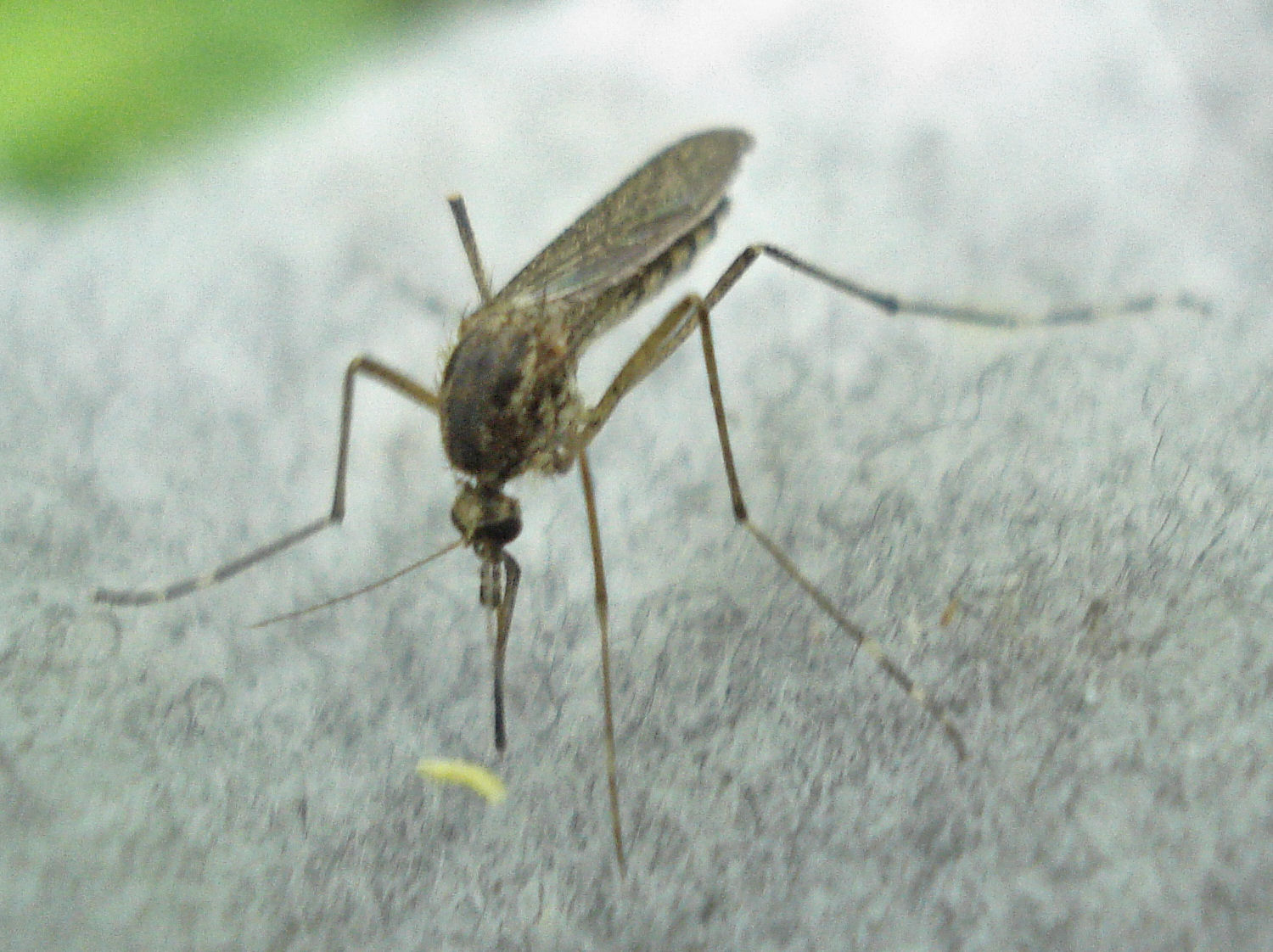

Scientific classification
- Kingdom: Animalia
- Phylum: Arthropoda
- Class: Insecta
- Order: Diptera
- Family: Culicidae
- Genus: Aedes
- Species: A. cantans

Binomial name
- Aedes cantans (Meigen, 1818)

Synonyms
- Culex cantans Meigen, 1818; Ochlerotatus cantans (Meigen, 1818)

= Aedes cantans =

Species of mosquito

Aedes cantans is a widespread Palearctic species of mosquito in the family Culicidae. First described by Johann Wilhelm Meigen in 1818, this species occurs from western Europe, including the British Isles, eastwards through central Asia as far as China.

== Description ==
Aedes cantans adults typically measure 6 to 8 mm in length. The species is characterized by a whitish vertex, a mesonotum with a prominent dark central stripe and paler lateral stripes, and white scales along the mesonotum edge. Tergites are pale-banded at the base and the legs bear whitish rings on the tarsi. Morphologically, it belongs to the annulipes group within the genus Aedes.

== Distribution ==
This species is broadly distributed across Europe (including the British Isles, Fennoscandia to the Mediterranean), western Russia, and into central Asia and parts of China.

== Habitat and ecology ==
Aedes canntans is primarily a woodland species, thriving in shaded, moist environments such as forest edges and damp thickets. The larvae develop in ephemeral pools, puddles, or leaf litter depressions within woodlands, often relying on pools that persist through winter and spring. The species is univoltine, meaning the adults emerge in late spring to early summer, with eggs laid during summer months hatching when inundated in winter or early spring.

== Life cycle ==
The eggs of Aedes cantans are laid among damp leaf litter or mud at the edge of temporary forest ponds. These eggs typically overwinter and hatch in response to winter/spring flooding. Larval development occurs over several months, with pupation and adult emergence concentrated in April and May. There is usually only one generation per year, although rare second generations may occur in favorable conditions.

== Feeding and behavior ==
Female A. cantans require a blood meal to produce eggs, with hosts including humans, cattle, and other large mammals. Newly emerged females often feed on nectar and other sugar sources before seeking blood meals, which typically begin three weeks post-emergence. Peak adult activity and biting season occur from late spring to mid-summer, with biting peaking at dusk. Larval and adult sizes, as well as survival, are influenced by population density and environmental factors such as pond duration and predation.

== See also ==
- List of Aedes species
- Culicidae
