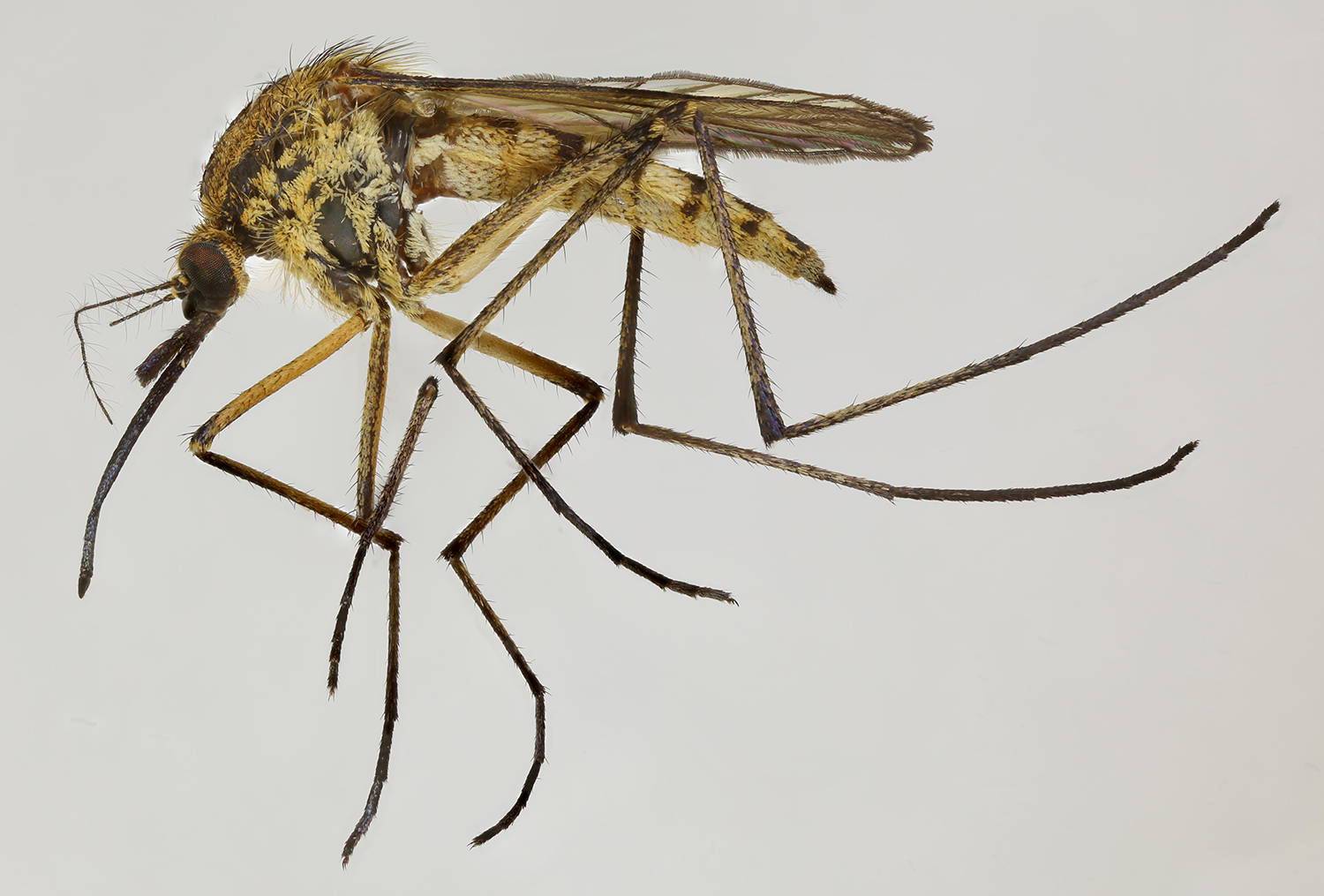
- Aedes rusticus North Wales

Scientific classification
- Kingdom: Animalia
- Phylum: Arthropoda
- Class: Insecta
- Order: Diptera
- Family: Culicidae
- Genus: Aedes
- Subgenus: Rusticoidus
- Species: A. rusticus

Binomial name
- Aedes rusticus (Rossi, 1790)

Synonyms
- Aedes diversus Theobald 1901 Ochlerotatus rusticus (Rossi, 1790)

= Aedes rusticus =

Species of mosquito

Aedes rusticus is a relatively common European mosquito, that is often responsible for human bites from May to August. Like all mosquitoes, it is only the females that bite.

== Distribution ==
Aedes rusticus has a patchy distribution, from Britain (mainly southern), Belgium, Denmark, Poland, Russia, The Balkans and as far as Asia Minor.

== Life cycle ==
Following a mammal blood meal to provide sufficient protein to produce eggs, females will lay their egg rafts in spring or summer in dried-up pools, they will hatch when the pools flood later in the year. They will overwinter in the 4th larval stage, pupation and adult emergence take place the following spring.

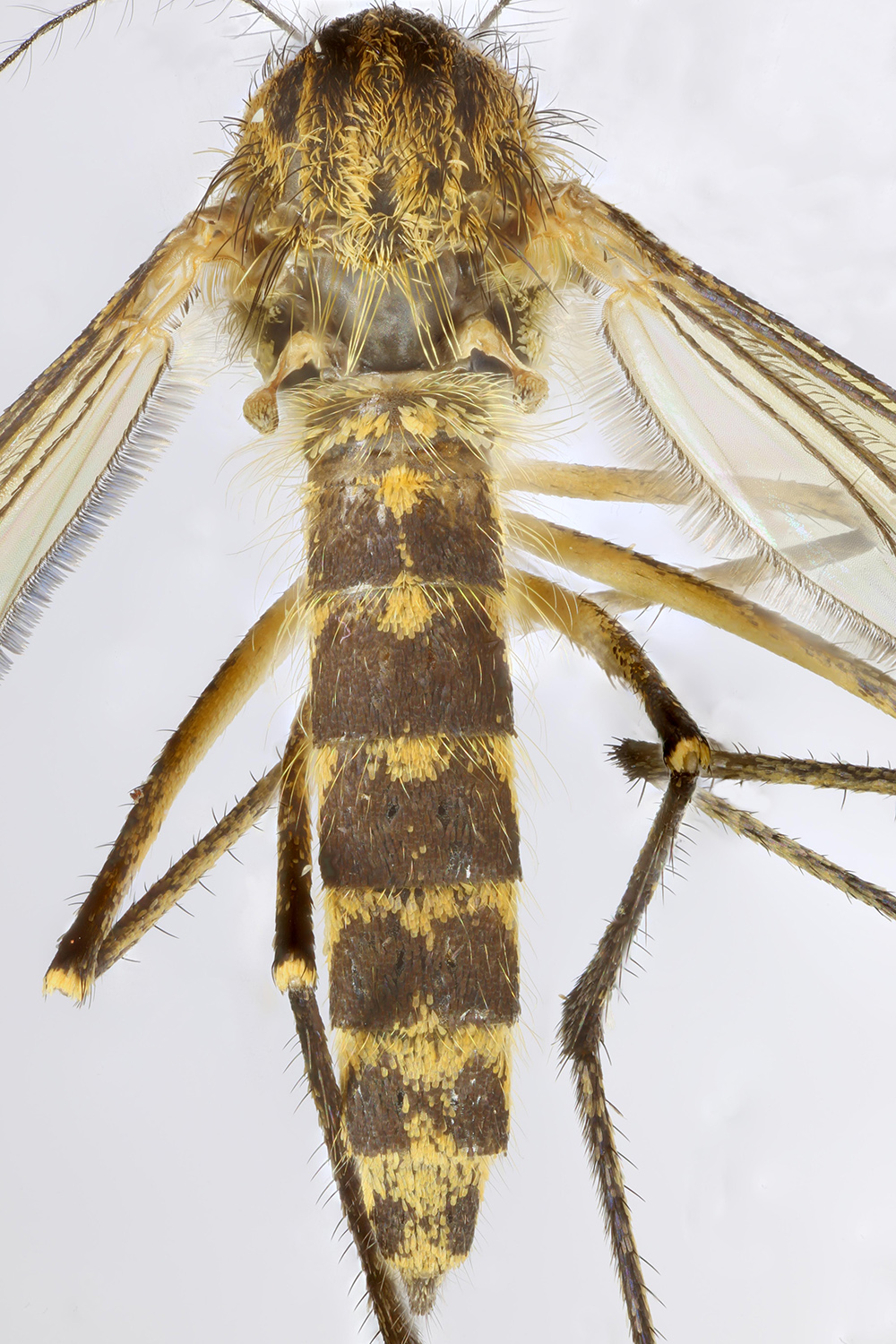
Dorsum
