= Snowshoe hare virus infection =

Snowshoe hare virus infection (SSHV) is a neglected mosquito-borne illness that can cause neuroinvasive disease in humans. SSHV was first detected in the blood of a snowshoe hare in 1959 found in the US state of Montana, and has since been classified as one of the 18 California serogroup (CSG) viruses. Cases of SSHV have been geographically reported in Canada and the northern USA.

It is speculated that snowshoe hares and possibly other small mammals are the primary or amplifying hosts of the virus. Other animals have demonstrated SSHV antibody positivity, including lemmings and red-backed voles in Alaska, ground squirrels in Montana, and larger animals like foxes, caribou and bears in northern Canada.

== Signs and symptoms ==
SSHV infection in humans can range from subclinical symptoms to more severe neurological disease like encephalitis and meningitis. Commonly reported symptoms include fever, nausea, vomiting, headache, and confusion. Some cases have been found to present with a diffuse macular rash on the face, trunk, and upper and lower extremities, with conjunctival injection and mucocutaneous desquamation. Due to these nonspecific febrile symptoms, many cases go undiagnosed. Serologic studies from the 1980s have reported antibody positivity rates around 40%, which signifies a considerable number of undetected human infections.

== Virology ==
SSHV is from the orthobunyavirus genus, peribunyaviridae family, and bunyavirales order. As part of the orthobunyarius genus, SSHV is enveloped and contains a single-stranded negative sense tripartite genome. Moreover, as part of the orthobunyavirus genus, there is concern with reassortment of the viral genome, especially in areas where both LaCross virus (LACV) and SSHV are prevalent.

== Diagnosis ==
SSHV can be detected using IgM antibody-capture ELISA (MAC-ELISA) or a competitive enzyme-linked immunosorbent assay (cELISA), followed by a confirmatory plaque reduction neutralization test (PRNT). Usually MAC-ELISA and PRNT are run in parallel.

== Prevention ==
No vaccine has been developed yet. Since there is no formal treatment developed yet, the main focus is on disease prevention through mosquito-bite prevention. This includes wearing Insect repellent when outdoors, wearing long protective clothing, using air conditioning while indoors, and avoiding the hours of dawn and dusk when mosquitoes are most prevalent.

== Treatment ==
At this time, treatment of SSHV is supportive and focuses on management of symptoms and potential complications.

== Epidemiology ==
Reports of SSHV in animals and humans have been localized to northern latitude regions of Canada and the northern US. Within the US, SSHV has been detected in animals from Alaska, Montana, Wyoming, North Dakota, Wisconsin, Ohio, New York, and Massachusetts.

In Canada, mosquito season lasts from May to October, and peaks in the late summer from July to early September. Since SSHV is able to survive through harsh winters, there is a theory that the virus survives through winter due to transovarial transmission, survival in reservoir species, or overwintering in mosquitos.

=== One health ===
It is important to talk about neglected and emerging infectious diseases, especially mosquito-borne diseases, as they are expected to become more prevalent due to the effects of climate change. Due to the warming effects of climate change, the Arctic tree line has been shifting northwards, which affects the prevalence of mosquito populations by providing more habitats for hosts and vectors to breed in. One study from Newfoundland found that snowshoe hares captured from closed-canopy environments had higher SSHV seropositivity than snowshoe hares captured from open-canopy environments. This indicates a relationship between habitats and animal health, as closed-canopy environments may increase mosquito breeding and increase prevalence of CSG viruses. Though the majority of cases have been limited to North America, one study in Japan had tested for JCV seropositivity and found a 44% cross-reactivity to SSHV.

== History ==
SSHV was first discovered in a blood sample from a snowshoe hare covered in ticks in 1959 by Willy Burgdorfer in western Montana. It was later found that SSHV was not transmitted by ticks, but rather mosquitos. SSHV has been recovered from the Aedes genus of mosquitos, as well as Culiseta impatiens and Culiseta inornata mosquitos. A 2024 study concluded that Culex pipiens mosquitoes are also capable of transmitting SSHV.

== Reported cases ==
The vast majority of SSHV cases are thought to be asymptomatic or undetected, however there are several reported neuroinvasive cases of SSHV in humans. Between 1978-1989 there was approximately one symptomatic case with a CSG virus per year, with the majority of cases found to be SSHV. A study in New Brunswick, Canada has shown increasing prevalence of SSHV, with a relationship between seropositivity and male sex and older age. Between 1978 and 1981, there were ten reported cases of human meningoencephalitis related to SSHV in Quebec, Ontario, and Nova Scotia, Canada. Three of these were pediatric cases of SSHV encephalitis identified in young boys, ages 6–10 from Quebec. Another case of acute meningitis was diagnosed in a 30-year-old male from Ontario, Canada in 1978. In 2007, a 3-year-old boy from Nova Scotia was diagnosed with SSHV-related meningoencephalitis. In 2015, a case of CSG viral encephalitis with SSHV and Jamestown Canyon virus (JCV) positivity was reported in a 73-year-old man from Grand Manan Island in New Brunswick. In 2017, there was a case of meningoencephalitis in northern Manitoba in a 24-year-old Aboriginal male. In 2019, there were 19 reported cases or exposures to CSG in Winnipeg, Manitoba, with one positive for SSHV. Most recently, there were three cases of pediatric encephalitis with JCV and SSHV positivity in August 2024 in Whistler, British Columbia.
