= Transstadial transmission =

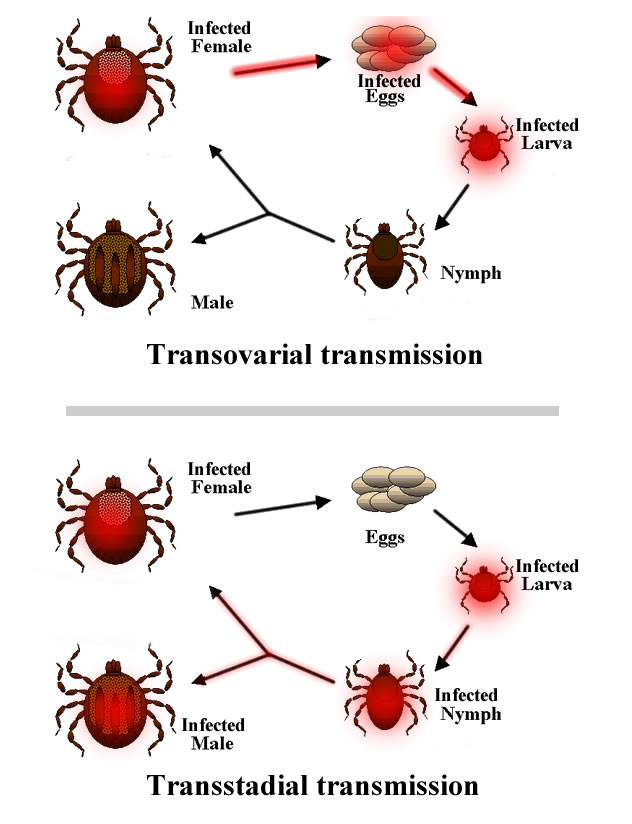
Transovarial and transstadial transmission of the Ixodes tick

Transstadial transmission is the persistence of a symbiont or pathogen in an organism from one life stage ("stadium") to the next, such as larva to nymph to adult. This type of transmission is typically observed in insects. For example, the bacterium Borrelia burgdorferi, the causative agent for Lyme disease, infects the tick vector as a larva, with the infection maintained as the tick molts to a nymph and later develops as an adult. Transstadial transmission is also seen with other microbes such as other bacteria, fungi, and viruses in numerous insects. In addition to ticks, mites are another common vector. Transstadial transmission is especially relevant to public health, as several threats to public health are maintained in insect populations by transstadial transmission. Some debate exists regarding the classification of transstadial transmission as vertical transmission versus horizontal transmission. Reasons for this stem from further debate regarding transovarial transmission, described as the passage of a symbiont or pathogen from an infected female to its progeny, especially in eggs.

Transstadial blockage is the opposite of transstadial transmission in which the symbiont or pathogen cannot be carried over from one life stage to the next. This aspect serves to hinder transmission as the symbiont or pathogen is with the host for a shorter period, allowing for lower chances of transmission.

== Epidemiology ==
Outbreaks of emerging infectious diseases have been increasing in frequency as human populations expand and encroach on previously undisturbed or uninhabited areas. Vector-borne diseases have presented significant challenges to maintaining public health over the past century. Furthermore, arthropod-borne diseases have been at the forefront of vector-borne diseases, bringing epidemics of plague, tularemia, yellow fever, malaria, Japanese encephalitis, Eastern equine encephalitis, West Nile Virus disease, leishmaniasis, and several others. Epidemiologically-relevant transstadial transmission is primarily observed in mites, ticks, and mosquitoes that serve as arthropod vectors of disease.

=== Transstadial transmission of pathogens in arthropod vectors ===
==== Lyme Disease (Borrelia burgdorferi) ====
Lyme disease, caused by the bacterium Borrelia burgdorferi, is spread to humans via the bite of an infected blacklegged tick, also known as a deer tick (Ixodes scapularis). B. burgdorferi is considered enzootic, meaning that it is perpetuated in animals in the environment, outside of humans. In the cycle from ticks to animals, an uninfected tick larva feeds on an infected host, such as a deer or a mouse, leading to infection of the tick. The infection is transstadial in ticks because the bacterium will persist in the tick as it molts from a larva to a nymph. Humans are a dead-end host for B. burgdorferi and do not function in the natural cycling of the bacterium in the environment.

B. burgdorferi contains a 1Mb linear chromosome with multiple linear and circular plasmids with genes encoding lipoproteins that become activated under various conditions. Additionally, B. burgdorferi is an auxotroph for all amino acids, nucleotides, and fatty acids, and does not contain genes encoding proteins for use in the tricarboxylic acid cycle or oxidative phosphorylation. When the tick engages in its nymphal bloodmeal, B. burgdorferi undergoes many changes in gene expression, upregulating protein generation for use in attachment to the host and establishing infection. Virulence genes are also activated in concert with tick saliva production, further advancing the ability for the bacterium to become established in the new host.

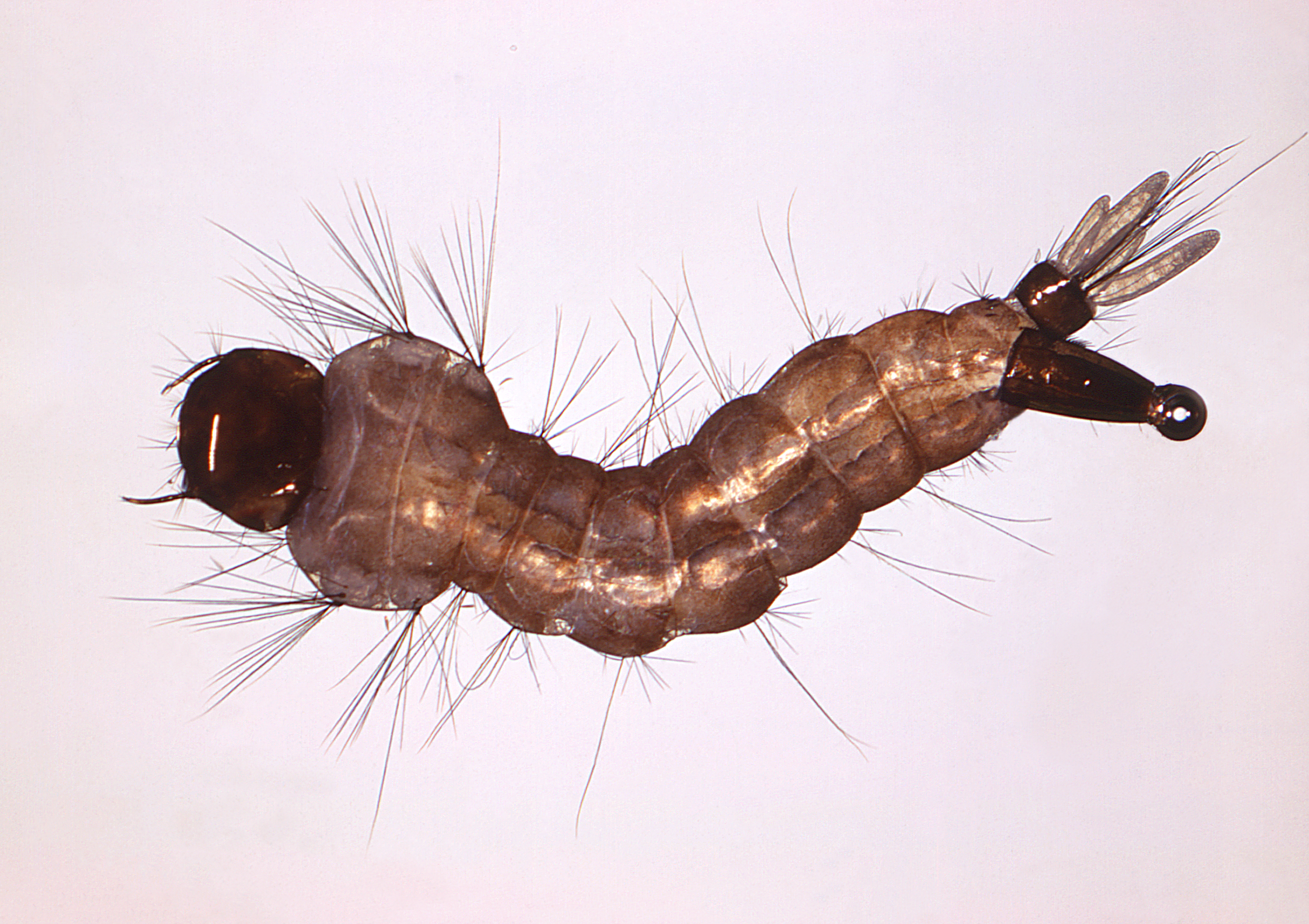
Aedes triseriatus is the most common vector for La Crosse virus, causing La Crosse Encephalitis. This mosquito is also implicated in the transmission of West Nile Virus.

==== La Crosse Virus ====
La Crosse virus is primarily transmitted via the Eastern Treehole mosquito (Aedes triseriatus). Disease caused by La Crosse virus can result in serious neurological complications, such as La Crosse Encephalitis, most often occurring in children and is endemic to the eastern United States.

La Crosse virus undergoes transovarial transmission in mosquitoes, passing from one generation to the next. Additionally, after infection of the mosquito egg, the virus remains in the mosquito as it progresses through its life stages, completing transstadial transmission. Mosquitoes may become infected by feeding on the blood of reservoir hosts in the environment, allowing for the transmission of the virus in the genetic line of the mosquitoes in the environment.

==== Anaplasma spp. ====
Anaplasma is a bacterial genus causing costly economic losses worldwide, particularly in the food animal agricultural sector. Infection by Anaplasma results in anaplasmosis, a disease which can cause both serious and subclinical disease. Anaplasma is another arthropod-vectored disease and is also spread through the bites of infected ticks, particularly Ixodidae ticks and potentially mosquitoes as well. Numerous scientific reports present claims of transovarial and transstadial transmission of Anaplasma in ticks.

Ruminants are the primary reservoir for Anaplasma spp., but the bacteria can also be found in wild animals. In ticks, Anaplasma spp. can be transmitted transstadially, and the ticks become infected by feeding off infected animals, allowing for transmission to un-infected animals. Debate exists among scientists regarding the ability for transovarial transmission of Anaplasma spp. in ticks. Recent research, however, has built evidence for transovarial transmission of at least some Anaplasma species in ticks.

== Transstadial transmission and fungal communities in mosquitoes ==
Symbioses and microbiomes are one of the main drivers in the development of immunity, particularly with commensal organisms. Microbiota-immune system interactions promote the development of host-microbe partnerships through organismal cross-talk and maintaining organismal boundaries to ensure niche fulfillment in each organism involved in the symbiosis.

Transstadial transmission is an important factor in the persistence of microbes in their hosts, particularly within arthropods such as insects, which morph from one life stage to another. Adult mosquitoes have been a hallmark organism for the study of transstadial transmission of microbes from the larval stage into adulthood, largely due to their involvement in the transmission of pathogens relevant to public health and the study of pathogen environmental persistence.

One study, published in 2020, presented evidence for the involvement of fungus in the mosquito microbiome influencing the development of differential bacterial components in the mosquito microbiome. The authors reported finding less bacteria in freshly emerged adult mosquitoes compared to the prior larval stage, significantly influenced by fungal colonization of the hindgut. The authors hypothesized that physiological and environmental changes associated with fungal colonization, such as less available nutrients and altered pH contributed to the decrease in bacteria from larvae to adult. It is clear from this study that further research is needed to understand the interplay between fungal colonizers and bacteria which can successfully transmit transstadially in mosquitoes to better understand bacterial persistence in these important disease-vectoring arthropods.

Another study evaluated the effect of Aspergillus oryzae fungus on the malaria parasite (Plasmodium berghei) in Anopheles stephensi mosquitoes. Ultimately, the researchers determined that incorporating a recombinant A. oryzae fungus strain into the mosquito larvae promoted the persistence of the fungus in the adult mosquito stage and prevented oocyst formation of P. berghei in the mosquito midgut. The researchers determined that the fungus is a candidate for environmental control of malaria parasite control in mosquitoes by incorporation of the fungus into mosquitoes as a paratransgenesis model carrying effector proteins to prevent parasite development in the developing mosquito.

== See also ==
- Transovarial transmission
