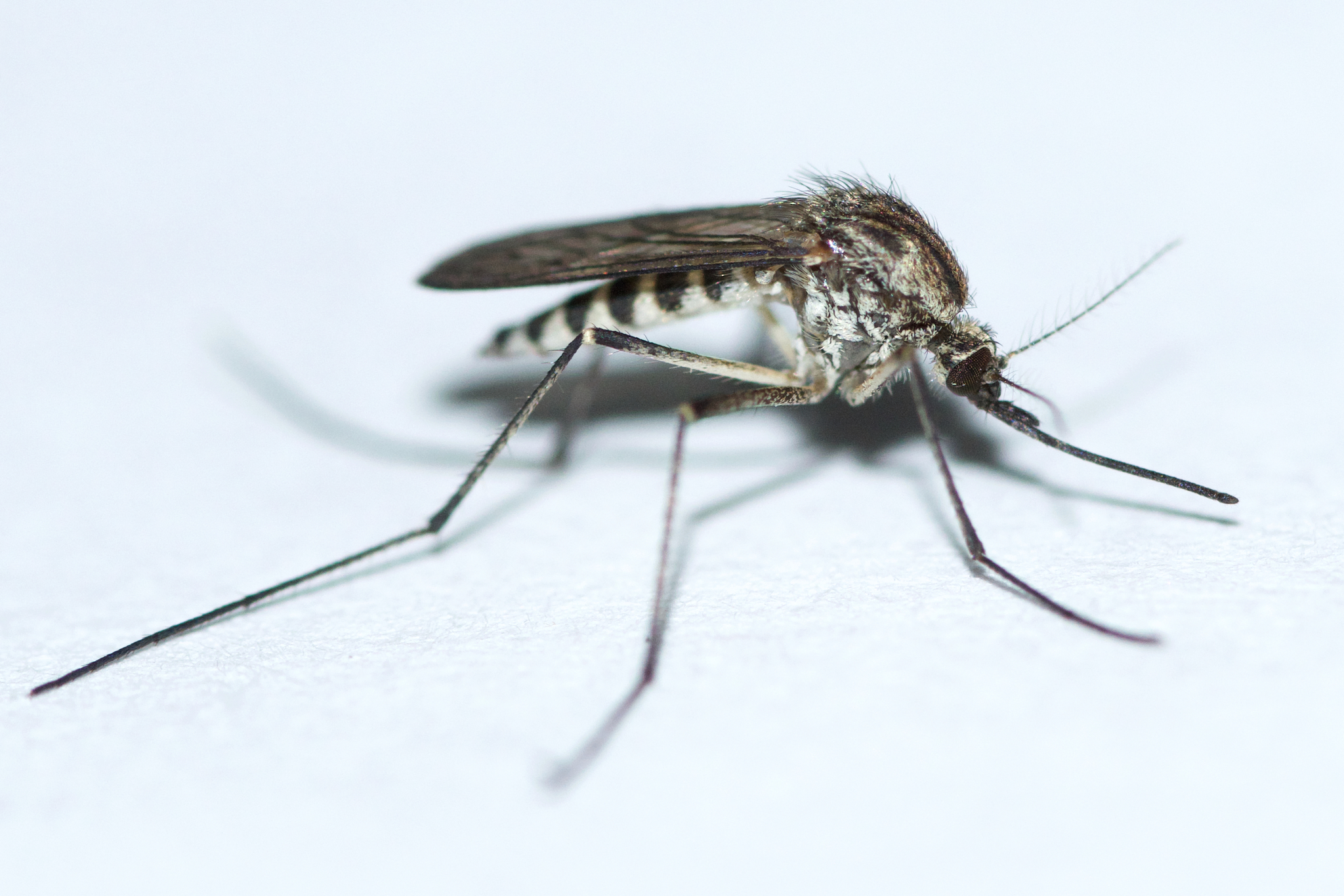

Scientific classification
- Kingdom: Animalia
- Phylum: Arthropoda
- Class: Insecta
- Order: Diptera
- Family: Culicidae
- Genus: Aedes
- Subgenus: Rusticoidus
- Species: A. provocans

Binomial name
- Aedes provocans (Walker, 1848)

= Aedes provocans =

Species of mosquito

Aedes provocans, or woodland mosquito, is a species of mosquito belonging to the genus Aedes. It is primarily found in North America, particularly in temperate regions.

== Distribution ==
A. provocans is commonly found in woodland areas, hence its common name. It is native to North America and has been documented in various regions, including Wisconsin.

== Life cycle and behavior ==
Like other Aedes species, A. provocans goes through four life stages: egg, larva, pupa, and adult. The females lay their eggs in areas prone to flooding, such as woodland pools or temporary water bodies. The eggs can withstand desiccation and remain viable for extended periods, allowing them to survive through adverse conditions, including cold winters.

Adult females bite animals to draw blood in order to have enough nutrients to lay eggs. Besides that, both females and males of this species are known for nectar foraging, particularly from Canada plum (Prunus nigra) and pin cherry (Prunus pensylvanica) blossoms. This nectar feeding behavior occurs soon after emergence. Males feed on nectar before completing hypopygial rotation or swarming, while females do so before mating or seeking a blood host

== Medical importance ==
This species is known to be a vector for West Nile virus, which causes West Nile fever in several animals, including humans. While it may not be as significant a vector as some other mosquito species, its ability to transmit this pathogen makes it a species of interest in public health surveillance and mosquito control programs.

Aedes provocans is also known to be a vector for Jamestown Canyon virus. This mosquito species overwinters with the virus through vertical or transovarial transmission, meaning infected females can pass the virus to their offspring.

Control measures for A. provocans are similar to those used for other mosquito species of the Aedes genus. These may include source reduction (eliminating standing water), use of larvicides in breeding sites, and personal protection measures such as using insect repellents and wearing protective clothing.
