= Jamestown Canyon encephalitis =

- Specialty: Infectious disease

Jamestown Canyon encephalitis is an infectious disease caused by the Jamestown Canyon virus, an orthobunyavirus of the California serogroup. It is mainly spread during the summer by different mosquito species in the United States and Canada.

The virus is one of a group of mosquito-borne or arthropod-borne viruses, also called arboviruses, that can cause fever and meningitis or meningoencephalitis, mostly in adults. Jamestown Canyon virus disease is relatively rare; in the United States, the CDC found only 31 disease cases from 2000 to 2013, but it is likely under-recognized and probably endemic throughout most of the United States and parts of Canada.

== Signs and symptoms ==
About 2 days to 2 weeks after the bite of an infected mosquito, disease symptoms of a nonspecific summertime illness with sore throat, runny nose and cough, followed by fever, headache, nausea and vomiting can develop. Many cases are asymptomatic, although the ratio of symptomatic to asymptomatic cases is unknown. Neuroinvasive disease occurs in two thirds of reported cases and is characterized by severe headache and neck stiffness as in meningitis or increasing lethargy and altered mental status up to coma as in meningoencephalitis. Roughly half of reported cases are hospitalized, but deaths from the virus are rare. No acquisition from a blood transfusion has been reported.

== Virology ==
Jamestown Canyon virus

Virus classification
- (unranked): Virus
- Realm: Riboviria
- Kingdom: Orthornavirae
- Phylum: Negarnaviricota
- Class: Bunyaviricetes
- Order: Elliovirales
- Family: Peribunyaviridae
- Genus: Orthobunyavirus
- Species: Orthobunyavirus jamestownense

Synonyms
- Jamestown Canyon orthobunyavirus

The Jamestown Canyon virus is an orthobunyavirus and was first isolated in 1961 from Culiseta inornata mosquitoes in Jamestown, Colorado. Since then it has been found in Aedes, Coquillettidia perturbans, Culex, Culiseta and Ochlerotatus species in northern states of the mainland US, in various mammals throughout mainland North America, and identified in humans throughout the United States.

=== Lifecycle ===
The virus is transmitted in saliva to a vertebrate host when an infected mosquito takes a blood meal. It thus cycles between mosquito and vertebrate amplifier hosts, mainly white-tailed deer. In a study from Newfoundland, JCV was significantly associated with large mammals such as sheep, cattle and horses.

The virus winters in mosquito eggs, which it reaches by transovarial transmission. The female mosquito lays eggs that carry the virus, and the offspring can transmit the virus to deer or ruminants and humans. Infected mosquitoes were found equally distributed throughout the state of Connecticut, irrespective of land use.

=== Molecular biology ===
The full genome has been sequenced. The authors found a relatively high level of amino acid sequence conservation from viruses isolated 57 years apart "indicating that the virus is in relative evolutionary stasis". They also found JCV to be genetically similar to Ingå virus in Northern Europe (Finland, Sweden), "suggesting that much of the northern hemisphere contains JCV or similar variants". The negative sense RNA genome is in three segments. The L segment encodes the L endonuclease (an RNA-dependent RNA polymerase enzyme) for genome replication and mRNA synthesis. The M segment encodes a polyprotein, further cleaved in the Gn and Gc surface glycoproteins for attachment and the NSm nonstructural protein that influences virulence. The S segment encodes the NSs protein for immune suppression and virulence, and the N structural nucleocapsid protein.

== Diagnosis ==
The Centers for Disease Control and Prevention considers a person with JCV infection laboratory-confirmed if: JCV isolated from or JCV-specific antigen or genomic sequences detected in tissue, blood, cerebrospinal fluid, or other body fluids; 2) equal or more than 4-fold change in JCV-specific neutralizing antibody titers between acute and convalescent samples; or 3) JCV or LACV IgM antibodies in serum with JCV-specific neutralizing antibodies equal or more than 4-fold higher than LACV-specific neutralizing antibody titers in the same specimen or a later specimen.

JCV-antibody testing has only been available at the CDC and the New York State Department of Health. The CDC has used plaque reduction neutralization tests to detect JCV neutralizing antibodies since 1995. The test is automatically done on all samples testing positive or equivocal for La Crosse Virus IgM antibodies by ELISA. In 2010 CDC developed an ELISA also for JCV IgM . Similarly, the New York State Department of Health has performed JCV plaque reduction neutralization tests since 2000 on samples positive for California serogroup IgG antibodies. It does the latter by an immunofluorescence assay. Prior to the 1990s, the only tests for California serogroup virus infections performed by most state diagnostic laboratories were complement-fixation test and hemagglutination inhibition tests with La Crosse virus, but these failed to detect antibody to Jamestown Canyon virus.

=== Differential diagnosis ===
Besides La Crosse virus, other arboviruses producing similar disease in a similar geographic location include first and foremost West Nile virus, Powassan virus, Eastern equine encephalitis virus, Saint Louis encephalitis and Western equine encephalitis virus, the latter two not being reportable to CDC. For 2013, CDC reported that of 22 JCV disease cases, 15 (68%) were neuroinvasive, which is a slightly higher percentage than for West Nile virus (51%), but less common than for the other arboviruses, with La Crosse virus being 91%, Eastern equine encephalitis virus 100% and Powassan virus 80% neuroinvasive.

== Treatment and prevention ==
No specific therapy exists for arboviral infections; treatment is limited to supportive care and managing complications, such as relieving increased intracranial pressure. Preventing and decreasing the morbidity from JCV disease depends on control of the mosquito vectors and personal protection to reduce mosquito bites.

NIAID reported in 2012, that it had constructed a candidate virus for a live attenuated virus vaccine.

== Epidemiology ==
Since 2004, the disease must be reported to CDC (passive surveillance, ArboNET). JCV has been mostly reported in adults rather than in children (median age 48 years versus 8 years), and is more likely to cause meningitis than encephalitis compared to illness caused by La Crosse virus. It also occurs throughout the summer (May until September), or even throughout the year rather than mostly in August, which may be due to the diversity of mosquitoes it can infect.

Increasing awareness and more testing

In the latest US review covering 2000–2013, more than half of cases were identified in 2013 alone, the first year the CDC implemented routine JCV IgM antibody testing.

Geography

Historically, most cases of encephalitis reported to the CDC occurred in the north of the mainland United States. JCV disease most likely has a broader distribution, but is unidentified and under-reported, because testing is not considered and not straightforward. In 2013, of 10 states reporting cases, eight states reported their first JCV cases: Georgia, Idaho, Massachusetts, Minnesota, New Hampshire, Oregon, Pennsylvania, and Rhode Island. In August 2015, the Iowa Department of Public Health confirmed one case of JCV. In July 2017, the Maine Center for Disease Control announced what is believed to be Maine's first known case. In September 2025, Vermont confirmed the first human case of JCV following detection in mosquitoes several months prior.

Season

Historically disease was reported to occur from late spring through early fall. However, for 2013, dates of illness onset ranged from January through November, with 14 (64%) of the 22 cases occurring during July until September.
