= Culiseta glaphyroptera =

Scientific classification
- Domain: Eukaryota
- Kingdom: Animalia
- Phylum: Arthropoda
- Class: Insecta
- Order: Diptera
- Family: Culicidae
- Genus: Culiseta
- Species: C. glaphyroptera

Binomial name
- Culiseta glaphyroptera (Schiner, 1864)

Species of fly

Culiseta glaphyroptera is a species of mosquito in the family Culicidae.

== Description ==
Culiseta glaphyroptera is morphologically similar to Culiseta bergrothi, but it can be distinguished by its entirely dark maxillary palps and tarsomeres. Unlike Cs. bergrothi, which is confined to Northern Europe, Cs. glaphyroptera has a broader distribution in Central Europe.

== Distribution ==
This species is primarily found in montane regions of Central and Southeastern Europe, with notable populations in areas such as the southwestern Czech Republic, Thuringian Forest, Harz Mountains, Black Forest, and Ore Mountains. It has also been recorded in Luxembourg caves and other subterranean habitats across Europe.

This species thrives in cold, clear water environments like rock or spring pools, often located in shaded areas. Larvae are typically found in semi-permanent water bodies such as marshes and swamps. Adults overwinter as females and produce one to two generations annually.
