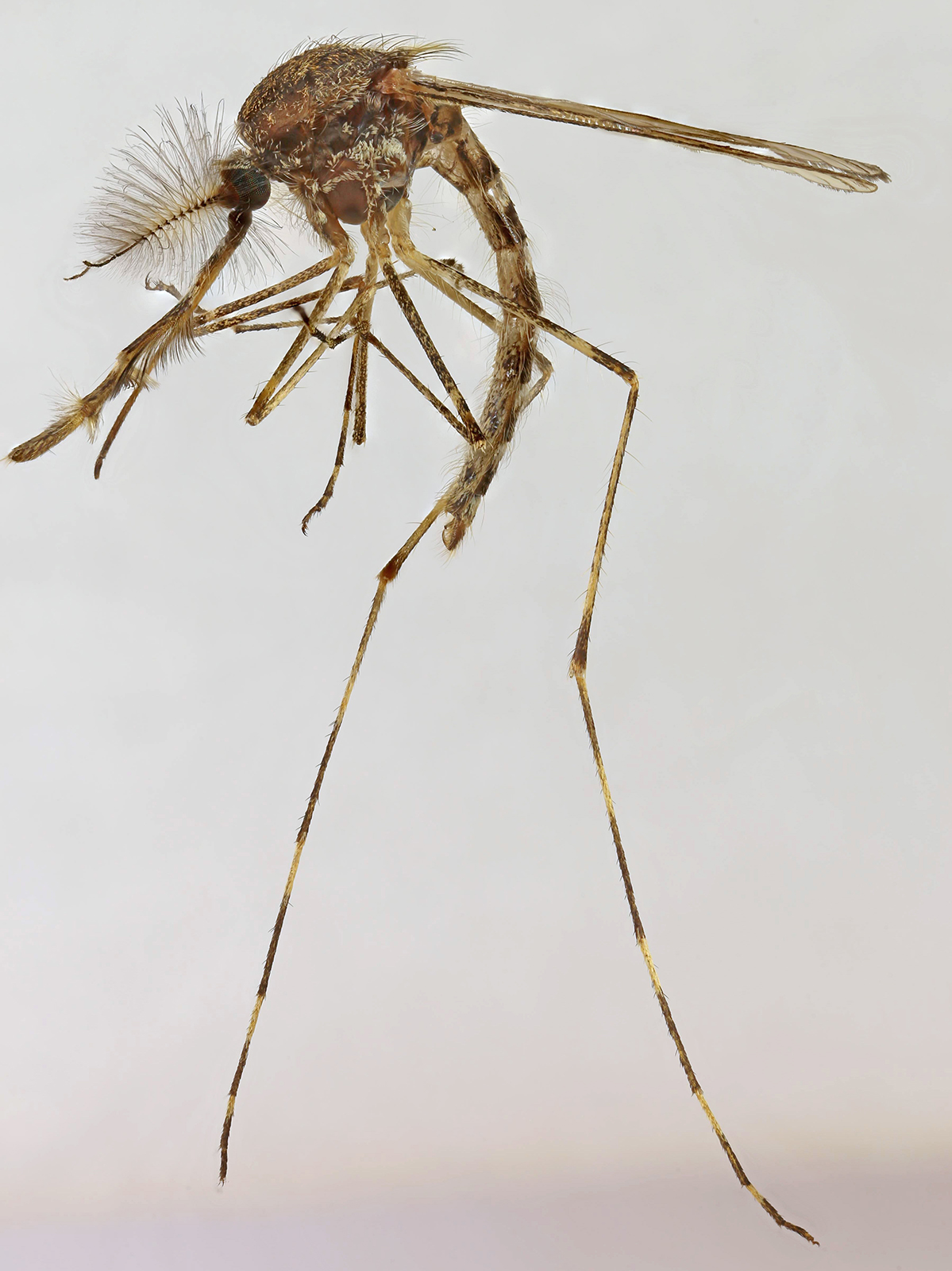
- Male specimen found in Trawscoed, North Wales

Scientific classification
- Kingdom: Animalia
- Phylum: Arthropoda
- Clade: Pancrustacea
- Class: Insecta
- Order: Diptera
- Family: Culicidae
- Genus: Culiseta
- Species: C. annulata

Binomial name
- Culiseta annulata (Schrank, 1776)

= Culiseta annulata =

Species of mosquito

Culiseta annulata is a species of mosquito in the family Culicidae. It is found in the Palearctic.

== Ecology ==
Culiseta annulata overwinters in its adult stage. In Northern Europe, females of this species are found in caves from autumn to early spring together with females of genus Culex (Culex pipiens, Culex torrentium, and Culex territans).

In the Czech Republic the most frequent animals bitten by it are european fallow deer and red deer, however it also bites humans, sheep, other deer and pigs.

On 16 October 2025 it became the first mosquito species with both male and females identified in Iceland. None were found over the summer of 2026.

=== Vector potential ===
Japanese encephalitis virus RNA has been detected in its saliva and it is a competent if inefficient vector of Tahyna virus.
