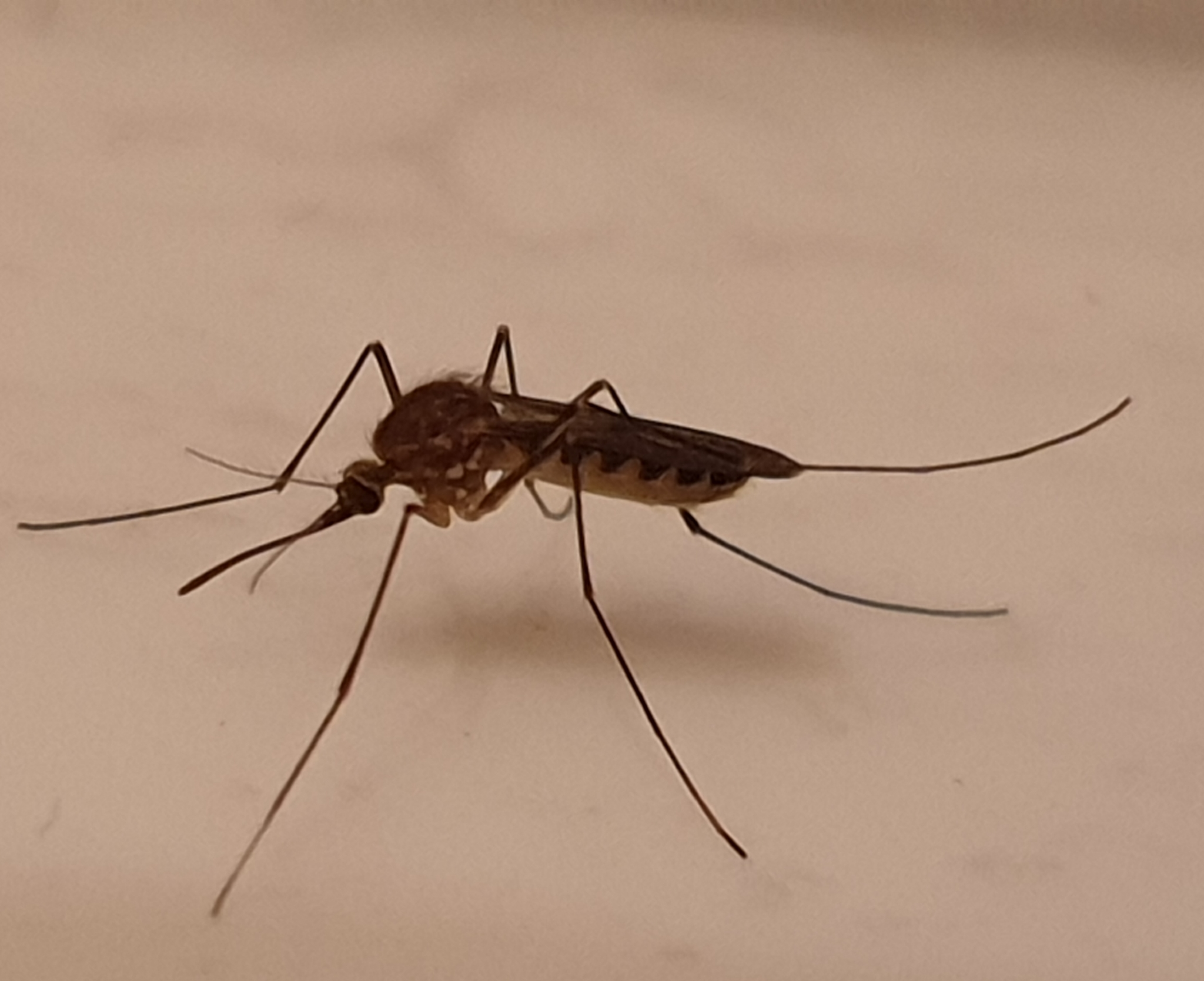

Scientific classification
- Kingdom: Animalia
- Phylum: Arthropoda
- Class: Insecta
- Order: Diptera
- Family: Culicidae
- Genus: Culex
- Species: C. territans

Binomial name
- Culex territans Walker, 1856

Synonyms
- Culex frickii Ludlow, 1906; Culex nematoides Dyar & Shannon, 1925; Culex pyrenaicus Brolemann, 1919; Culex saxatilis Grossbeck, 1905

= Culex territans =

Species of mosquito

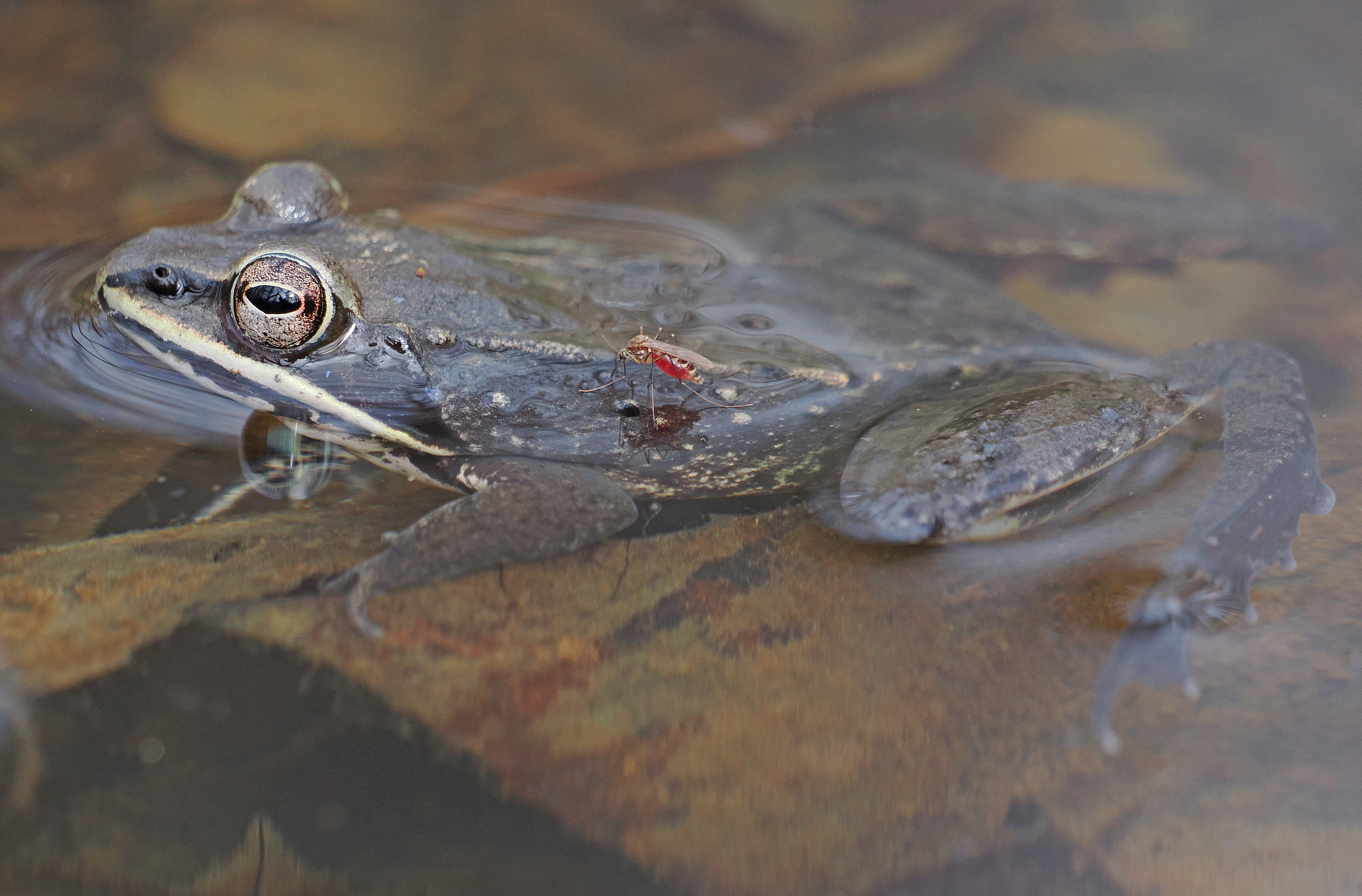
Northern Frog-Biting Mosquito (Culex territans) taking a blood meal from a Wood Frog (Lithobates sylvaticus) in Springfield, Virginia.

Culex territans, or the Northern Frog-Biting Mosquito, is a species of mosquito found throughout North America, Europe, North Africa, and the Arabian Peninsula.

== Ecology ==
Adult female Culex territans overwinter in protected, humid, underground environments like caves. In northern Europe, overwintering females are found in caves together with Culex pipiens, Culex torrentium, and Culiseta annulata.

Larvae can be found in clean ponds with plenty of vegetation.

== Feeding behavior ==
=== Host preference ===
Females of this species can feed on many vertebrates . However, they most frequently feed on reptiles and amphibians, and they prefer frogs.

=== Finding hosts ===
This species is attracted to the calls of frogs. Light is necessary for host-seeking as they do not feed in complete darkness. Body temperature is not an important cue in host-seeking, which makes sense as their primary hosts are ectothermic.

== Medical and veterinary importance ==
Since they mainly feed on frogs, they do not pose a direct threat to human health in terms of vectoring pathogens. However, they have been found to be infected with West Nile Virus and Eastern Equine Encephalitis virus and may occasionally feed on humans, so they can potentially be of public health concern.

Adult female Cx. territans have been found to harbor various pathogens such as anuran trypanosomes, ranaviruses, and filarial worms. It has also been shown capable of mechanically transmitting the spores of chytrid fungus between frogs.
