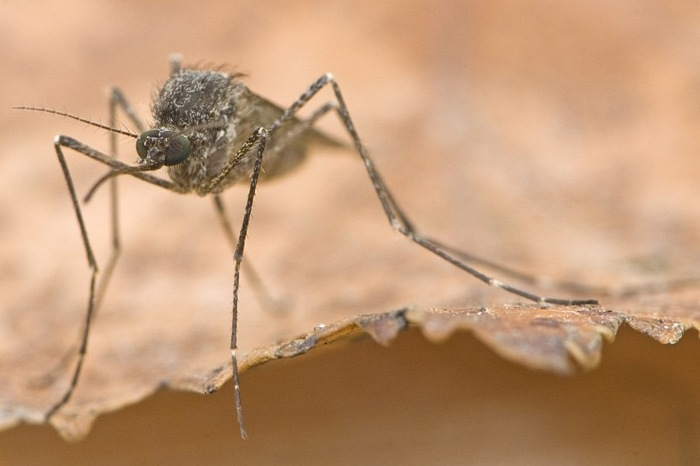

Scientific classification
- Kingdom: Animalia
- Phylum: Arthropoda
- Class: Insecta
- Order: Diptera
- Family: Culicidae
- Genus: Culiseta
- Species: C. alaskaensis

Binomial name
- Culiseta alaskaensis Felt, 1904

= Culiseta alaskaensis =

Culiseta alaskaensis Temporal range: Eocene–Present

Species of mosquito

Culiseta alaskaensis, the Alaskan winter mosquito, is a Holarctic species of mosquito in the family Culicidae. It is found from Colorado north, Alaska, including from the Upper Cook Inlet region to the tundra. As with other Culiseta species, C. alaskaensis are cold-adapted and have appeared in the same habitats as Culiseta impatiens.

There are 35 known species of mosquito in Alaska. Although all species were found to be in low percentages, Aedes mosquitoes showed 0.57 per 1,000, the Culiseta mosquitoes averaged 7.91 per 1,000 mosquitoes as vectors for Plasmodium circumflexum parasites. The short Alaskan summers disrupts the parasitic life cycle preventing the spreading of diseases. Thousands of mosquitoes were collected from Anchorage, Fairbanks, and Coldfoot over two summers of 2011 and 2012 by members of a research team from the University of California, Davis and a disease ecologist from San Francisco State University. Black-capped chickadees (Poecile atricapillus) in Anchorage and Fairbanks were found to be infected with the malaria parasite, but none in Coldfoot. Currently there is no evidence of any zoonosis.

== Habitat ==
Mosquito habitat includes almost anywhere there is standing or slow moving water. This includes ponds, sloughs, fresh or salt water marshes, containers, hollow trees, low depressions of land especially such as tundra, and moist areas of fields, bogs, and forests. All but adult mosquitoes, the eggs, "wrigglers", and "tumblers" are aquatic. Mosquito eggs can lie dormant for years. The insect survives below freezing temperatures because of two phases. Water is replaced by glycerol, acting as an antifreeze protecting the insect from bursting when frozen, and a supercooling process that lowers the body temperature below freezing, while the body fluids do not solidify.

== Concentration ==
Mosquitoes are more active between dawn and dusk, from the second week in June to the last week in July. There can be heavy concentrations, and even ferocious swarms, when there is little wind, around ponds, or in tundra. In many northern regions, around winter breakup, there can be hordes of the large and vicious hibernators.

The willow ptarmigan (Lagopus lagopus) is the official state bird of Alaska, but the unofficial title goes to the mosquito.
