= California encephalitis virus =

Virus classification
- (unranked): Virus
- Realm: Riboviria
- Kingdom: Orthornavirae
- Phylum: Negarnaviricota
- Class: Bunyaviricetes
- Order: Elliovirales
- Family: Peribunyaviridae
- Genus: Orthobunyavirus
- Species: Orthobunyavirus encephalitidis

Synonyms
- California encephalitis orthobunyavirus

Species of virus

California encephalitis virus was discovered in Kern County, California, and causes encephalitis in humans. Encephalitis is an acute inflammation of the brain that can cause minor symptoms, such as headaches, to more severe symptoms such as seizures. Mosquitoes serve as its carrier and for this reason this virus is known as an arbovirus (arthropod-borne virus).

California encephalitis virus belongs to the Orthobunyavirus genus of viruses. The La Crosse virus from the same genus is also a common cause of encephalitis in the United States. Other viruses with similar disease symptoms but genetically unrelated include: Saint Louis encephalitis and West Nile virus.

== History ==
It was first discovered and isolated in 1943, from Aedes melanimon mosquitoes collected in Kern County, California. Two years later the first human cases of encephalitis were attributed to this new virus. Three cases in total were reported, and all three cases were in residents of Kern County in the Central Valley of California. In all three cases there was strong laboratory evidence confirming infection, due to the presence of neutralizing antibodies linked to California encephalitis. Since then, most cases of encephalitis have been associated with the La Crosse virus, and California encephalitis is a rare cause of disease in the Western world.

The original California Encephalitis virus was isolated and put alongside fifteen other related viruses that are now categorized as the "California serogroup". From 1996 to 1998, approximately three times as many reported human cases of arboviral encephalitis were caused by California serogroup viruses than were reported for western equine encephalomyelitis viruses, St. Louis encephalitis, and eastern equine encephalomyelitis viruses combined.

== California serogroup virus ==
The California serogroup of viruses includes seventeen viruses, all arthropod-borne viruses primarily transmitted by mosquitoes.. They are the second-most-common cause of arbovirus-associated neurological disease in North America. In addition to the California encephalitis virus, the serogroup includes:

- Jamestown Canyon virus
- La Crosse virus
- Snowshoe hare virus
- Trivittatus virus

== Signs and symptoms ==
The incubation period of California encephalitis is usually 3–7 days. An early symptoms phase of 1–4 days commonly precedes the onset of encephalitis, manifesting as fever, chills, nausea, vomiting, headache, lethargy and abdominal pain.

The encephalitis is characterized by fever, drowsiness, and lack of mental alertness and orientation. Seizures occur in 50% of children. Focal neurologic findings, like focal motor abnormalities and paralysis, irregular and abnormal reflexes develop in 20% of children. 10% of patients develop coma.

The total duration of illness rarely exceeds 10–14 days. Recurrent unprovoked seizures may occur even after the illness has passed; this develops in 20% of patients, especially those who had seizures during the acute illness. In adults, infection is asymptomatic, which means that the patient is a carrier of the infection, but experiences no symptoms or only mild feverish illness.

The mortality rate is less than 1% and most patients with encephalitis clinical symptoms recover completely. Up to 20% of patients develop behavioral problems or recurrent seizures.

== Pathophysiology ==
Initial infection by the virus and primary spread of the virus causes the onset of non-specific symptoms such as headache and fever. Secondary spread and the multiplication of the virus in the CNS (central nervous system) causes symptoms such as stiff neck, lethargy and seizures. It then can result in encephalitis, when inflammation of the brain, produced by infection by the virus, damages nerve cells, which affects signaling of the brain to the body.

After the virus enters the body via a mosquito bite, the virus undergoes local replication at the skin site where virus entered the body. A primary spread of virus occurs, with seeding of the reticuloendothelial system, mainly in the liver, spleen, and lymph nodes. With the ongoing replication of the virus a secondary spread occurs, with the seeding of the CNS. Not all the cases reach this stage, depending on the efficiency of viral replication at the different stages and the degree of virus spread. The California encephalitis virus invades the CNS through either the cerebral capillary endothelial cells or the choroid plexus.

== Treatment ==
Treatments are given to manage the symptoms the patient is having. In patients who are very sick, supportive treatment, such as mechanical ventilation, is equally important. Corticosteroids are used to reduce brain swelling and inflammation. Sedatives may be needed for irritability or restlessness. Acetaminophen is used for fever and headache. Anticonvulsants are used to prevent seizures. If brain function is severely affected, interventions like physical therapy and speech therapy may be needed after the illness is controlled.

== Epidemiology ==
Factors influencing the transmission and control of arboviral encephalitis, in general, include: the season, geographical location, patient age, and the regional climate. There are approximately 75 cases reported per year.

In the US the highest occurrence is in the Midwestern states, with most cases occurring in the late summer to early fall. Outdoor activities, especially in woodland areas, are associated with an increased risk of infection.
