= Culiseta niveitaeniata =

Scientific classification
- Domain: Eukaryota
- Kingdom: Animalia
- Phylum: Arthropoda
- Class: Insecta
- Order: Diptera
- Family: Culicidae
- Genus: Culiseta
- Species: C. niveitaeniata

Binomial name
- Culiseta niveitaeniata (Theobald, 1907)

Species of fly

Culiseta niveitaeniata is a species of mosquito in the family Culicidae.

== Distribution ==
This species is primarily found in India, Tibet, and China.
