= Culiseta novaezealandiae =

Scientific classification
- Kingdom: Animalia
- Phylum: Arthropoda
- Class: Insecta
- Order: Diptera
- Family: Culicidae
- Genus: Culiseta
- Species: C. novaezealandiae

Binomial name
- Culiseta novaezealandiae Pillai, 1966

Species of fly

Culiseta novaezealandiae is a species of mosquito. It is endemic to New Zealand. It is found in Southland and Otago. This species was first described by J. S. Pillai in 1966 using specimens collected at Tahakopa. The habitat of this species in its larval stage is coastal broadleaf swamp. It has been hypothesised that the hosts of C. novaezealandiae are birds. This mosquito species is regarded as being unlikely to be an arbovirus vector.
