= Culiseta inconspicua =

Scientific classification
- Kingdom: Animalia
- Phylum: Arthropoda
- Clade: Pancrustacea
- Class: Insecta
- Order: Diptera
- Family: Culicidae
- Genus: Culiseta
- Species: C. inconspicua

Binomial name
- Culiseta inconspicua Lee, 1937

Species of fly

Culiseta inconspicua is a species of mosquito in the family Culicidae.

== Description ==
Culiseta inconspicua is distinguished by its genetic characteristics. In a study of mosquito species in southeastern Australia, C. inconspicua was the only species found to have COI (cytochrome c oxidase subunit I) gene sequences containing ambiguous bases.

== Distribution ==
This species has been observed in Australia. Culiseta species are generally cold-adapted and often occur in warmer climates only during colder parts of the year or at higher elevations.
