= Culiseta hilli =

Scientific classification
- Kingdom: Animalia
- Phylum: Arthropoda
- Clade: Pancrustacea
- Class: Insecta
- Order: Diptera
- Family: Culicidae
- Genus: Culiseta
- Species: C. hilli

Binomial name
- Culiseta hilli (Edwards, 1926)

Synonyms
- Theobaldia hilli Edwards, 1926

Species of mosquito

Culiseta hilli is a species of mosquito in the family Culicidae.

== Distribution ==
This species is only found in southern Australia.

== Etymology ==
Its name derives from its habitat which is forests in hills.
