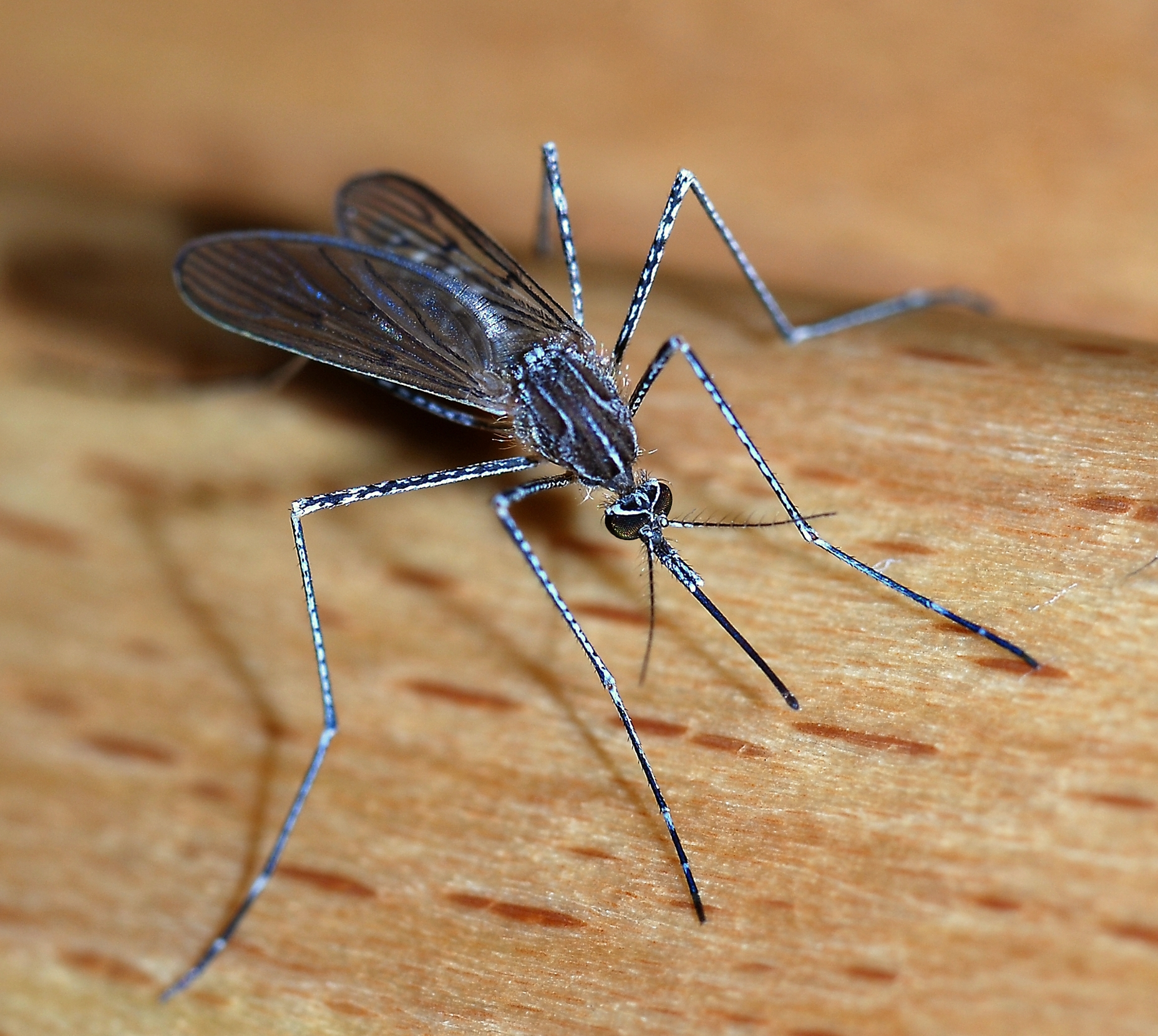

Conservation status
- Least Concern (IUCN 2.3)

Scientific classification
- Kingdom: Animalia
- Phylum: Arthropoda
- Class: Insecta
- Order: Diptera
- Family: Culicidae
- Genus: Culiseta
- Species: C. longiareolata

Binomial name
- Culiseta longiareolata Macquart, 1838

= Culiseta longiareolata =

Species of fly

Culiseta longiareolata is a species of mosquito.

== Distribution ==
This species can be found in the following countries:

- Albania
- Botswana
- Bulgaria
- Cyprus
- Djibouti
- Egypt
- Ethiopia
- France
- Greece
- Hungary
- India
- Iran
- Iraq
- Israel
- Italy
- Jordan
- Lebanon
- Lesotho
- Mauritania
- Morocco
- Namibia
- Pakistan
- Portugal
- Romania
- Russia
- Slovakia
- Somalia
- South Africa
- Spain
- Sudan
- Syria
- Tajikistan
- Tunisia
- Turkey
- Ukraine
- Yemen
