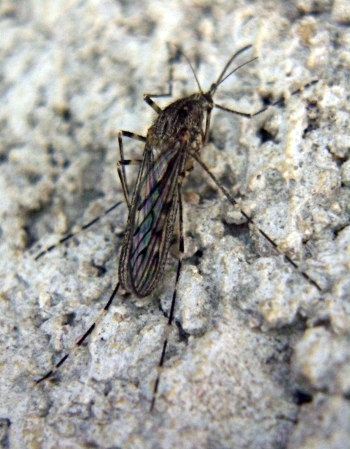

Scientific classification
- Kingdom: Animalia
- Phylum: Arthropoda
- Clade: Pancrustacea
- Class: Insecta
- Order: Diptera
- Family: Culicidae
- Genus: Culiseta
- Species: C. subochrea

Binomial name
- Culiseta subochrea (Edwards, 1921)

= Culiseta subochrea =

Species of fly

Culiseta subochrea is a species of mosquito in the family Culicidae.

== Distribution ==
Even though Culiceta species are adapted to cold weather, this species has been detected in warm countries such as Algeria, Armenia, Cyprus, Iran, Saudi Arabia, Tunisia, among others.
