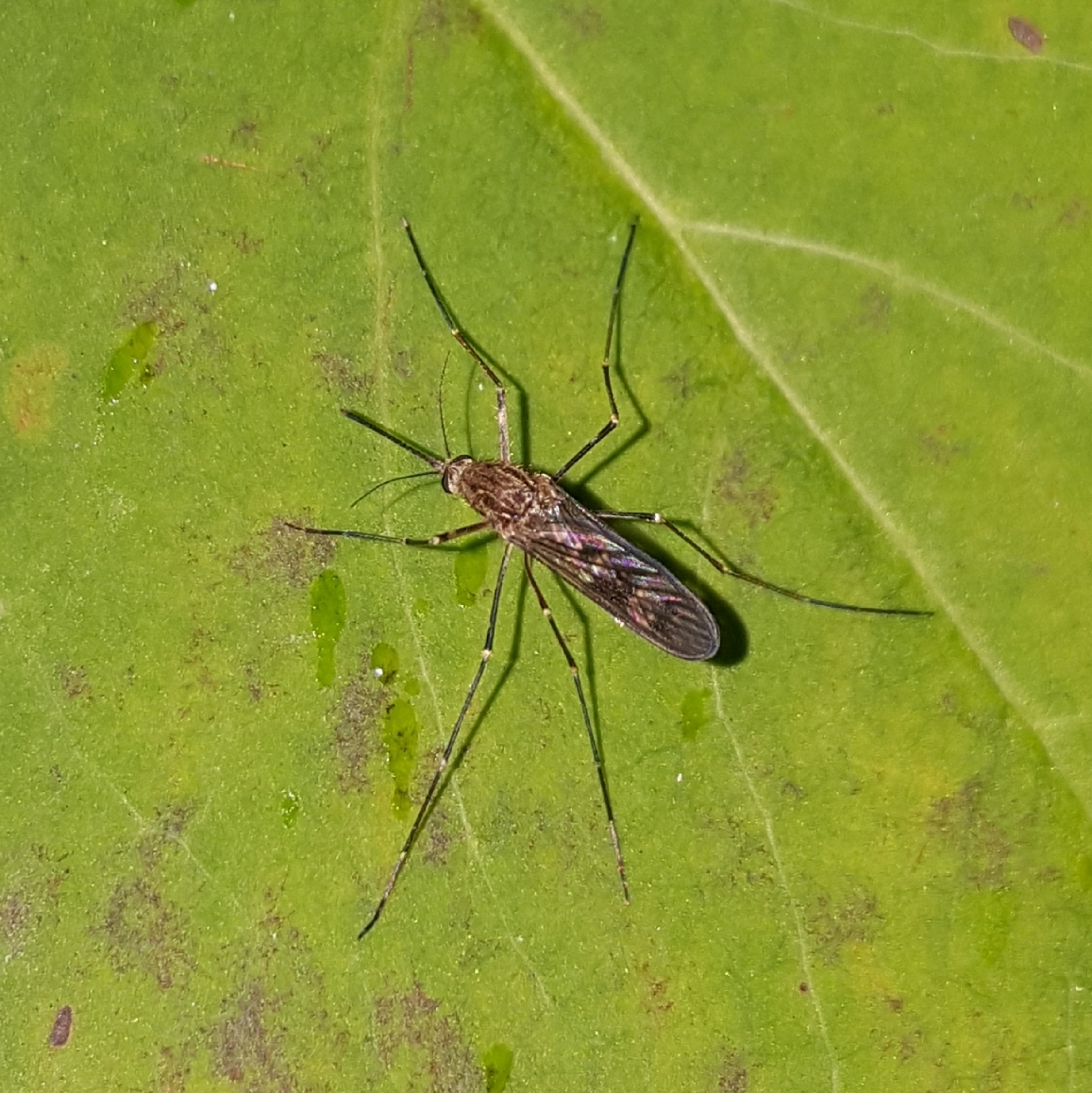

Conservation status
- Secure (NatureServe)

Scientific classification
- Kingdom: Animalia
- Phylum: Arthropoda
- Class: Insecta
- Order: Diptera
- Family: Culicidae
- Genus: Culiseta
- Species: C. incidens

Binomial name
- Culiseta incidens (Thomson, 1869)

Synonyms
- Culex incidens Thomson, 1869

= Culiseta incidens =

Species of mosquito

Culiseta incidens, the cool weather mosquito, is a species of mosquito in the family Culicidae.

This species is found along the western coast of Canada and the United States, from the Pacific Coast, from the Alaskan panhandle to the Mexican border. The eastern range is Saskatchewan to northwestern Texas. Specimens have been collected in Southern California.
