= Culiseta minnesotae =

Scientific classification
- Domain: Eukaryota
- Kingdom: Animalia
- Phylum: Arthropoda
- Class: Insecta
- Order: Diptera
- Family: Culicidae
- Genus: Culiseta
- Species: C. minnesotae

Binomial name
- Culiseta minnesotae Barr, 1957

Species of fly

Culiseta minnesotae is a species of mosquito in the family Culicidae.
