= Culiseta litorea =

Scientific classification
- Kingdom: Animalia
- Phylum: Arthropoda
- Clade: Pancrustacea
- Class: Insecta
- Order: Diptera
- Family: Culicidae
- Genus: Culiseta
- Species: C. litorea

Binomial name
- Culiseta litorea Shute, 1928

Species of fly

Culiseta litorea is a species of mosquito in the family Culicidae.

== Description ==
Like other Culiseta species, C. litorea goes through four life stages: egg, larva, pupa, and adult. Females lay an average of 109 eggs in the form of an egg raft, which is deposited on wet mud and leaf litter. The species overwinters as fourth instar larvae. Pupation occurs in April, with adults beginning to emerge in early May. The adult season typically lasts until September or October.

Females of C. litorea primarily blood-feed on birds. However, serological tests on blood-engorged females have shown that a small number may occasionally feed on humans, although they are not typically caught in human bait collections.

== Distribution ==
C. litorea has been observed in southern England, particularly in coastal regions. This species has also been recorded in other European countries such as Ireland.

== Etymology ==
The name derives from "litorea" meaning "of the shore" in Latin due to being commonly found in coasts.
