= Culiseta atlantica =

Scientific classification
- Kingdom: Animalia
- Phylum: Arthropoda
- Class: Insecta
- Order: Diptera
- Family: Culicidae
- Genus: Culiseta
- Species: C. atlantica

Binomial name
- Culiseta atlantica (Edwards, 1932)

Species of mosquito

Culiseta atlantica is a species of mosquito of the Culiseta genus.

== Distribution ==
This species has been reported in islands of the Azores. Females have been shown to lay their eggs in shaded rock-pool formations in basaltic beds.
