= Culiseta gedanica =

Scientific classification
- Kingdom: Animalia
- Phylum: Arthropoda
- Class: Insecta
- Order: Diptera
- Family: Culicidae
- Genus: Culiseta
- Species: †C. gedanica

Binomial name
- †Culiseta gedanica Szadziewski & Gilka, 2011

Species of mosquito

Culiseta gedanica is an extinct species of mosquito in the genus Culiseta. It is known from a male specimen found fossilised in Baltic amber.

It is named for the Gulf of Gdańsk, where large deposits of such amber are found.

== Description ==
The male specimen from the amber has a body length of 4.6 mm, 4.2 mm of which is the thorax and abdomen. Wing length of 4.17 mm, proboscis of 2.06 mm. Eyes touching. It is characterised by having prespiracular setae, a larger claw on the fore and mid legs with a basal and median tooth, as well as a smaller claw with a basal tooth. A simple, unmodified gonocoxite.
