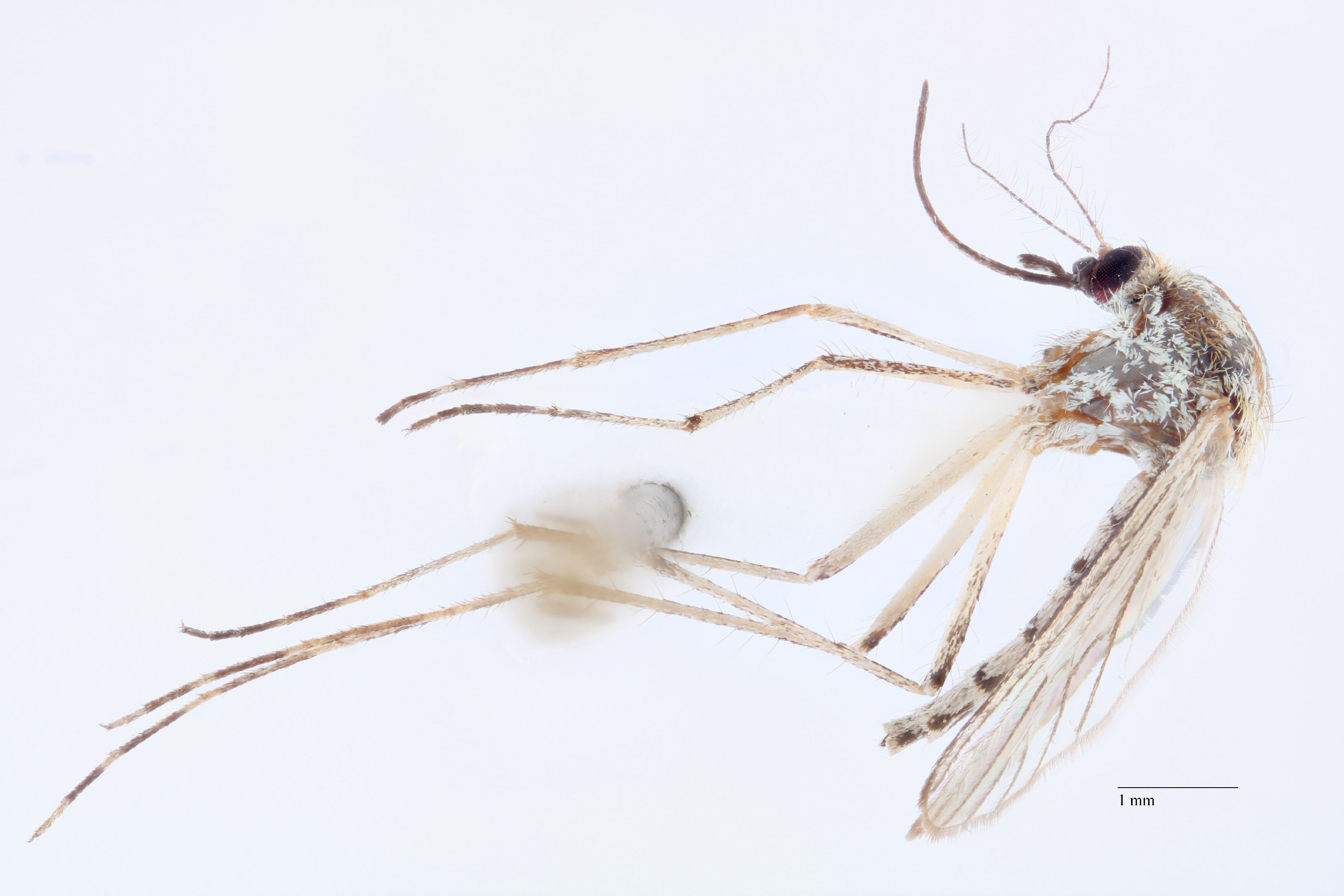

Scientific classification
- Kingdom: Animalia
- Phylum: Arthropoda
- Class: Insecta
- Order: Diptera
- Family: Culicidae
- Genus: Aedes
- Subgenus: Ochlerotatus
- Species: A. melanimon

Binomial name
- Aedes melanimon Dyar, 1924

Synonyms
- Ochlerotatus melanimon (Dyar, 1924)

= Aedes melanimon =

Species of mosquito

Aedes melanimon is a species of mosquito in the genus Aedes, subgenus Ochlerotatus. It is notable as a vector of several arboviruses affecting humans and animals, particularly in rural and agricultural regions.

== Taxonomy ==
Aedes melanimon was first described by Harrison G. Dyar in 1924 from specimens collected in Bakersfield, California. It closely resembles Aedes dorsalis but differs in wing scaling patterns, coloration, and male genitalia. Morphological identification can be challenging; genetic analysis provides reliable differentiation within the Aedes dorsalis group. The species is sometimes referred to by the synonym Ochlerotatus melanimon.

== Description ==
Adults are medium-sized and dark-bodied, with pale bands on the tarsi and distinctive scaling on the wings and abdomen. The species can be separated from similar mosquitoes by the male genitalia and by certain larval characteristics, such as a short mesothoracic hair.

== Distribution and habitat ==
Aedes melanimon is native to western and central North America, with a range including southwest Canada, most of the western and central United States, and newly reported populations in northern Mexico. Larvae develop in sunlit, temporary pools and flooded habitats such as irrigated pastures, duck clubs, marshes, and wildlife refuges.

== Ecology and behavior ==
The species is univoltine with a life cycle synchronized to seasonal flooding: eggs overwinter in soil or leaf litter and hatch when pools are flooded in late winter or spring. Adults emerge as early as five days after hatching. Both females and males feed on nectar, but females require blood meals to develop eggs. Hosts include livestock, wildlife, and humans; the mosquitoes are known for aggressive biting.

== Role in disease transmission ==
Aedes melanimon is a significant vector of western equine encephalitis virus, California group encephalitis viruses, and a competent laboratory vector of West Nile virus. It is an important pest in agricultural and rural communities where large emergences can impact animal and human health.
