= Culiseta particeps =

Scientific classification
- Kingdom: Animalia
- Phylum: Arthropoda
- Class: Insecta
- Order: Diptera
- Family: Culicidae
- Genus: Culiseta
- Species: C. particeps

Binomial name
- Culiseta particeps (Adams, 1903)

Species of mosquito

Culiseta particeps is a species of mosquito in the family Culicidae. It is found along the West coast of the United States including Southern California, Arizona as well as Mexico and Guatemala. Cs. particeps is not a known vector of human pathogens.
