= Culiseta bergrothi =

Scientific classification
- Kingdom: Animalia
- Phylum: Arthropoda
- Class: Insecta
- Order: Diptera
- Family: Culicidae
- Genus: Culiseta
- Species: C. bergrothi

Binomial name
- Culiseta bergrothi (Edwards, 1921)

Species of mosquito

Culiseta bergrothi is a species of mosquito of the Culiseta genus.

== Distribution ==
This species has been observed in various regions of northern Europe, including Estonia and Sweden. Its presence has been documented in specific provinces of Sweden and other northern habitats, often linked to forested wetlands and areas with seasonal flooding.

== Ecology ==
This species is associated with cold climates and is often found in habitats such as wetlands, bogs, and areas with abundant vegetation. Like other members of the genus Culiseta, it likely prefers environments with standing water for larval development. Seasonal flooding, particularly from melting snow, plays a significant role in shaping its habitat. It has been shown experimentally that the larvae of this species are capable of coprophagy. The life cycle of Culiseta bergrothi follows the typical mosquito stages: egg, larva, pupa, and adult. The development duration depends on environmental conditions, such as temperature and food availability.
