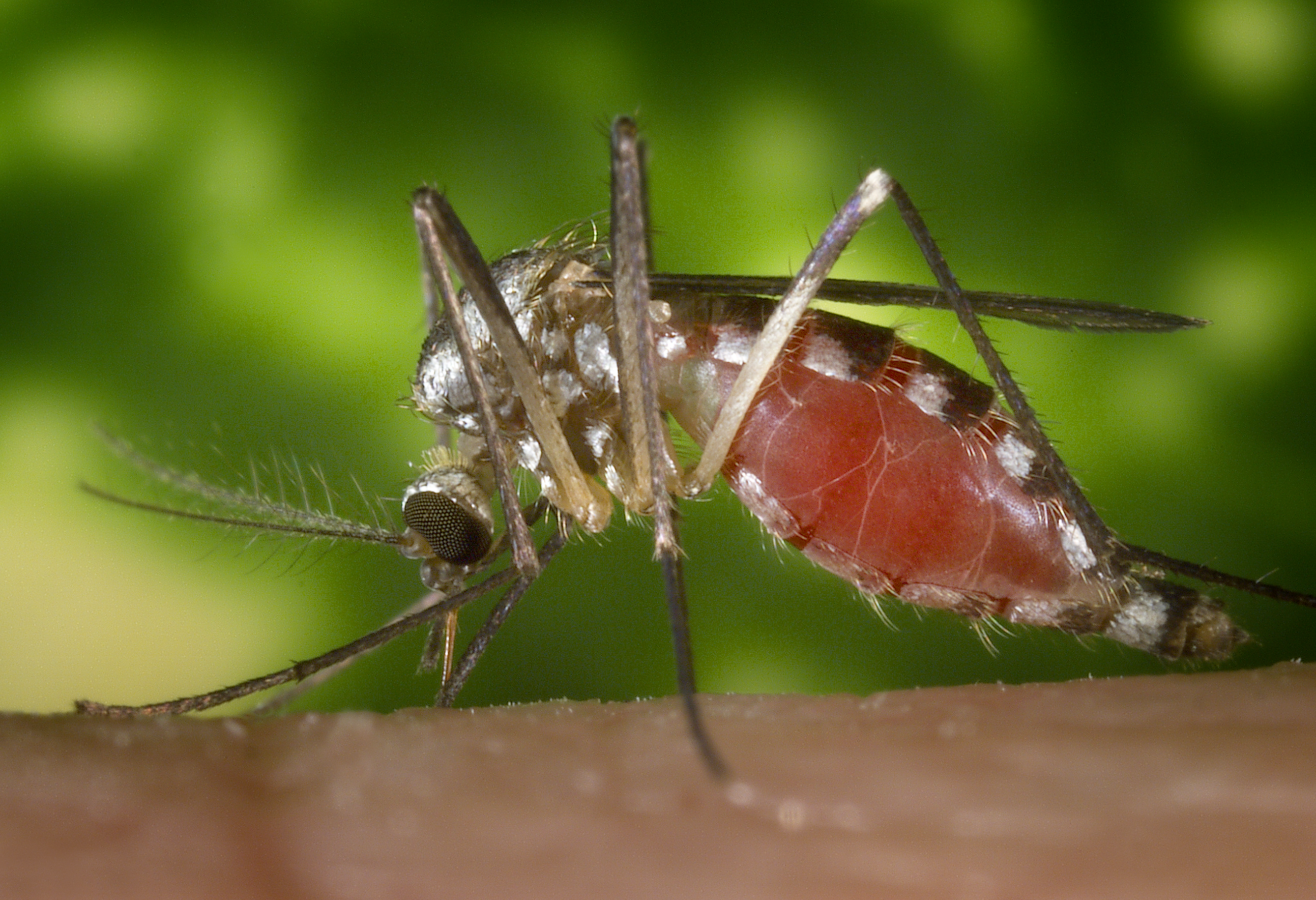

Scientific classification
- Kingdom: Animalia
- Phylum: Arthropoda
- Clade: Pancrustacea
- Class: Insecta
- Order: Diptera
- Family: Culicidae
- Genus: Aedes
- Subgenus: Protomacleaya
- Species: A. triseriatus

Binomial name
- Aedes triseriatus (Say, 1823)

Synonyms
- Culex triseriatus Say 1823; Ochlerotatus triseriatus (Say 1823)

= Aedes triseriatus =

Species of mosquito

Aedes triseriatus is a member of the true fly order (Diptera: Culicidae). It is called the eastern treehole mosquito due to its predilection towards breeding in stagnant water that is found in natural holding containers such as tree holes. It is native to the eastern United States and southern Canada and favors hardwood habitats. It has been found as far south as the Florida Keys, as far west as Idaho and Utah, and as far north as Quebec and Ontario. This species has not yet been found in Europe, but it has the potential to spread through international trade. In 2004, it was found in a shipment of tires travelling from Louisiana to France, but it was identified and targeted with insecticides that truncated its spread. It is a known vector of La Crosse encephalitis and canine heartworm disease. In the laboratory, it has been found to vector several other viruses including yellow fever, eastern encephalitis, Venezuelan encephalitis, and western encephalitis. Because of its potential for international spread and its proclivity for transmitting disease, monitoring the distribution of this species is essential.

== Description ==
=== Larvae ===
The antennae of these larvae are half the length of the head and are smooth. The antenna setae 1-A are single. Head hair 5 is typically single, and head hair 6 is generally double. Comb scales on the abdomen are in a single irregular row with each comb having a blunt spine evenly fringed with short spinules. The saddle on the anal segment is incomplete, generally extending only three-quarters around the anal segment. The siphonal tuft has two branches. The ventral brush has six pairs of setae, and the dorsal anal gills are longer than the ventral anal gills.

=== Adults ===
Aedes triseriatus has a dark scaled proboscis that is unbanded, dark palps, dark and narrow wing scales, and dark unbanded legs. The vertex has white scales. One of the most notable characteristics of this species is the scutum that has a median brown stripe of scales with silver white scales on the lateral sides. Both postspiracular and prespiracular setae are present.

== Life cycle ==
Aedes triseriatus has a holometabolous life cycle. Mating typically occurs in June and July, and females must take a blood meal prior to copulation to mature a batch of eggs. The eggs are oviposited by the female mosquito into stagnant water containers, such as tree holes and oftentimes unnatural containers like tires, and these eggs will fully embryonate after a few days. After being inundated with water, the eggs are stimulated to hatch from a lack of oxygen, and this typically occurs after a rainfall. There are four larval instars, and at the end of the fourth instar, the larvae will pupate. Adult mosquitoes will emerge between July and September in the United States.

The life cycle of A. triseriatus is closely related to temperature and humidity, and this mosquito is very resistant to lower temperatures, allowing for successful diapause throughout the winter in the southern United States. In northern areas, only the eggs will survive the winter, but in more southern areas, overwintering eggs and diapausing larvae can coexist. Additionally, not all eggs will hatch simultaneously because of the unpredictable nature of water levels during the summer months. Intermittent droughts and rainfall put an environmental pressure on mosquito eggs. In response, A. triseriatus will stagger egg hatching to counteract the selective pressure of irregular rainfall.

== Diet and hosts ==
The overall diet of this mosquito includes mammals, birds, reptiles, and amphibians. Main hosts for this mosquito are the eastern chipmunk (Tamias striatus), the gray squirrel (Sciurus carolinensis), and the fox squirrel (Sciurus niger). Only female mosquitoes take a blood meal to produce eggs, and they are typically aggressive human biters. Mosquitoes feed mainly at dusk and dawn, but they will bite during the day in wooded areas.

== La Crosse encephalitis ==
La Crosse virus (LACV) is part of the California serogroup bunyavirus and is transmitted by A. triseriatus. La Crosse virus causes La Crosse encephalitis and can be very serious among children (majority under the age of 16) in the United States. It was first isolated from a four-year-old child's brain in La Crosse, Wisconsin. Approximately 80 to 100 cases are reported to the CDC every year, but this can be grossly underreported. Other studies have suggested there may be up to 300,000 human infections a year with more than 1,000 being asymptomatic. LACV is difficult to distinguish between other central nervous system viral infections, and viral-specific IgM antibodies in the cerebral spinal fluid are used for differentiation. Unfortunately, these antibody levels could also remain elevated for more than nine months in over half the patients.

This disease is spread through the bite of an infected mosquito. This mosquito maintains the disease in the population through transovaial transmission (passed through mother to offspring), transstadial (across life stages), venereal (between mates), and it is amplified in smaller mammals through horizontal transmission (passed to hosts). The virus can overwinter in diapausing mosquito eggs and reemerge the following spring.

== Prevention and control ==
Aedes triseriatus, along with many other Aedes species, prefers water containers for breeding. This can be natural containers like tree holes, but they can also be found breeding in man-made containers. To control and prevent these mosquitoes from biting and transmitting disease, appropriate source reduction is necessary. A simple and cost-effective way to target mosquito breeding sites is to gain community involvement in eliminating standing water in each individual's backyard. This can be done by turning over temporary containers that hold water, covering containers that will permanently hold water, and removing trash (like bottle caps, bowls, toys, etc.) from the backyard. It can be difficult to remove important breeding spots like plant pots and bird baths, so community outreach and public education is essential to inform individuals on the effective way to manage breeding sites that will interrupt the mosquito development cycle.

Other methods to take precaution against mosquitoes that are seeking humans for a blood meal are available. To prevent mosquito bites and the potential for disease transmission, insect repellents containing DEET, Picaridin, IR3535, Oil of Lemon Eucalyptus, Para-menthane-diol, and 2-undecanone can be utilized. Furthermore, by wearing long-sleeves and long pants in addition to assuring proper screening at home, the prevention of mosquito bites can be maintained.

Various mosquito traps can be used for the surveillance and control of A. triseriatus and other container-breeding Aedes species. Oviposition cups can be used to collect mosquito eggs. These cups are black plastic cups that are lined with seed germination paper or construction paper. Female mosquitoes will lay their eggs on the water line inside these cups, and the eggs will adhere to the paper. The paper can then be removed and taken to a laboratory for hatching, testing, or sampling. BG-Sentinel traps are traps that can be baited with CO_{2} and additional lures that target olfactory cues. Mosquitoes will be attracted to these lures, since they imitate the odors of the hosts they need for blood-feeding. Furthermore, CDC light traps use a battery-operated light source, CO_{2}, and a fan that will attract and capture Aedes species effectively.
