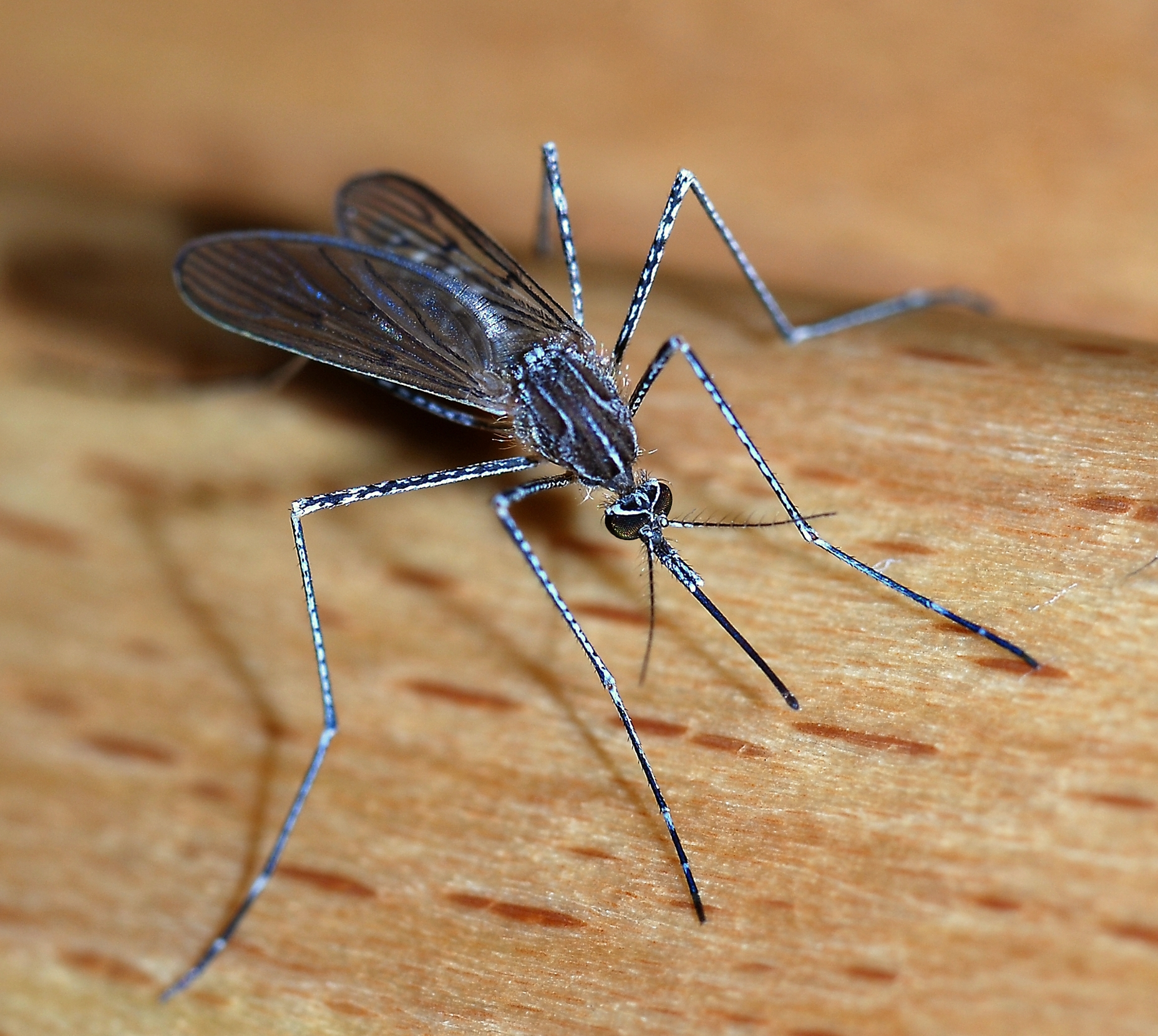
- Culiseta longiareolata

Scientific classification
- Kingdom: Animalia
- Phylum: Arthropoda
- Clade: Pancrustacea
- Class: Insecta
- Order: Diptera
- Family: Culicidae
- Genus: Culiseta; Felt, 1904

= Culiseta =

Culiseta Temporal range: Eocene–Present

Genus of mosquitos

Culiseta is a genus of mosquitoes. Most Culiseta species are cold-adapted, and only occur in warmer climates during the colder parts of the year or at higher elevations where temperatures are lower. Species found in Southern California are larger than most mosquitoes species, specifically C. inornata, C. particeps, and C. incidens. These species are found throughout the year in Southern California and feed on several vertebrate species, such as birds, livestock, rodents, reptiles, and humans. The larvae of most species are found in bogs, marshes, ponds, streams, ditches, and rock pools, but an African species occurs in tree holes ("phytotelmata"), a common eastern Palaearctic species occurs in water wells and rock pools, and several Australian species occur under ground. Little is known about the blood-feeding habits of females. Most species feed on birds and mammals, but a few feed on reptiles. Several species attack domestic animals and occasionally humans, and some species are pollinators.

Culiseta species are found throughout the world, except in South America. Two extinct species are known from the Eocene Kishenehn Formation in Montana.

== Species ==
=== Subgenus (Culiseta) Felt, 1904 ===
- Culiseta alaskaensis (Ludlow, 1906)

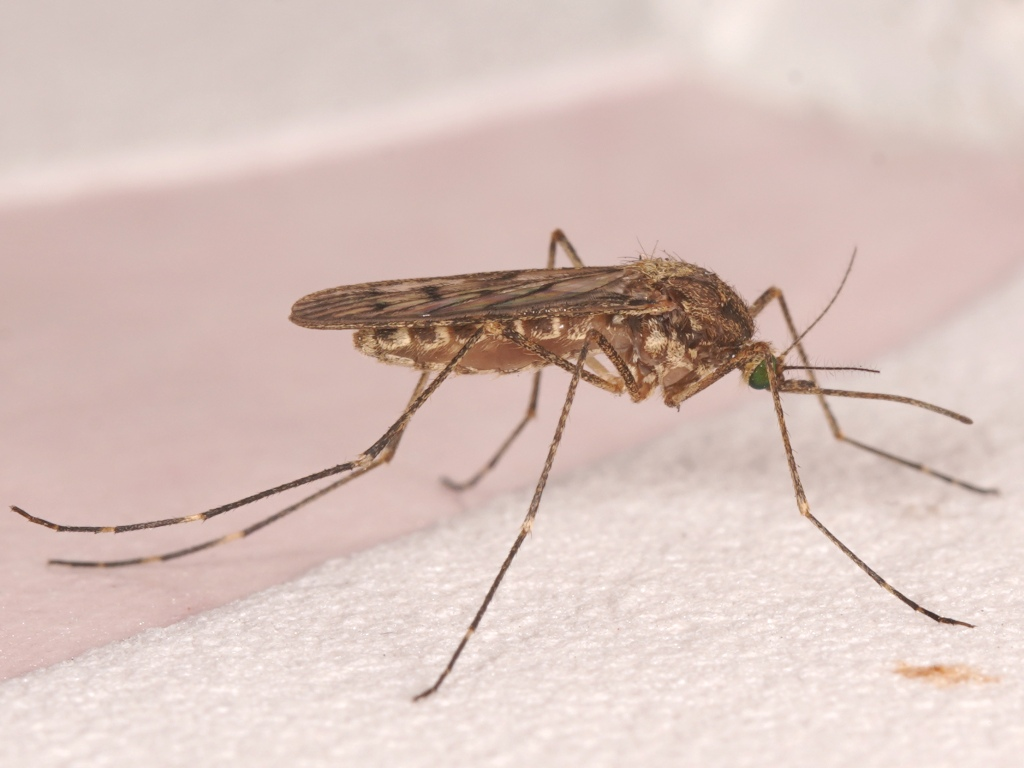
C. alaskaensis

- Culiseta annulata (Schrank, 1776)
- Culiseta atlantica (Edwards, 1932)
- Culiseta bergrothi (Edwards, 1921)
- Culiseta glaphyroptera (Schiner, 1864)
- Culiseta impatiens (Walker, 1848)
- Culiseta incidens (Thomson, 1869)
- Culiseta inornata (Williston, 1893)
- Culiseta megaloba Luh, Chao and Xu, 1974
- Culiseta niveitaeniata (Theobald, 1907)
- Culiseta particeps (Adams, 1903)
- Culiseta subochrea (Edwards, 1921)

=== Subgenus (Allotheobaldia) Brolemann, 1919 ===
- Culiseta longiareolata (Macquart, 1838)

=== Subgenus (Austrotheobaldia) Dobrotworsky, 1954 ===
- Culiseta littleri (Taylor, 1914)

=== Subgenus (Climacura) Howard, Dyar and Knab, 1915 ===
- Culiseta antipodea Dobrotworsky, 1962
- Culiseta marchettei García, Jeffery and Rudnick, 1969
- Culiseta melanura (Coquillett, 1902)
- Culiseta novaezealandiae Pillai, 1966
- Culiseta taiwanica Lien, Lin and Weng, 1999
- Culiseta tonnoiri (Edwards, 1925)

=== Subgenus (Culicella) Felt, 1904 ===
- Culiseta amurensis Maslov, 1964
- Culiseta atra Lee, 1944
- Culiseta drummondi Dobrotworsky, 1960
- Culiseta fumipennis Stephens, 1825
- Culiseta inconspicua Lee, 1937
- Culiseta litorea Shute, 1928
- Culiseta minnesotae Barr, 1957
- Culiseta morsitans Theobald, 1901
- Culiseta nipponica La Casse and Yamaguti, 1950
- Culiseta ochroptera Peus, 1935
- Culiseta otwayensis Dobrotworsky, 1960
- Culiseta sylvanensis Dobrotworsky, 1960
- Culiseta victoriensis Dobrotworsky, 1954
- Culiseta weindorferi Edwards, 1926

=== Subgenus (Neotheobaldia) Dobrotworsky, 1958 ===
- Culiseta frenchii (Theobald, 1901)
- Culiseta hilli (Edwards, 1926)

=== Subgenus (Theomyia) Edwards, 1930 ===
- Culiseta fraseri (Edwards, 1914)

=== Children with Uncertain Position ===
- Culiseta arenivaga Marks, 1968
- Culiseta wui Lin, Tseng and Lien, 2008

=== Extinct species ===
- †Culiseta gedanica Szadziewski & Gilka, 2011
- †Culiseta kishenehn Harbach & Greenwalt, 2012
- †Culiseta lemniscata Harbach & Greenwalt, 2012
