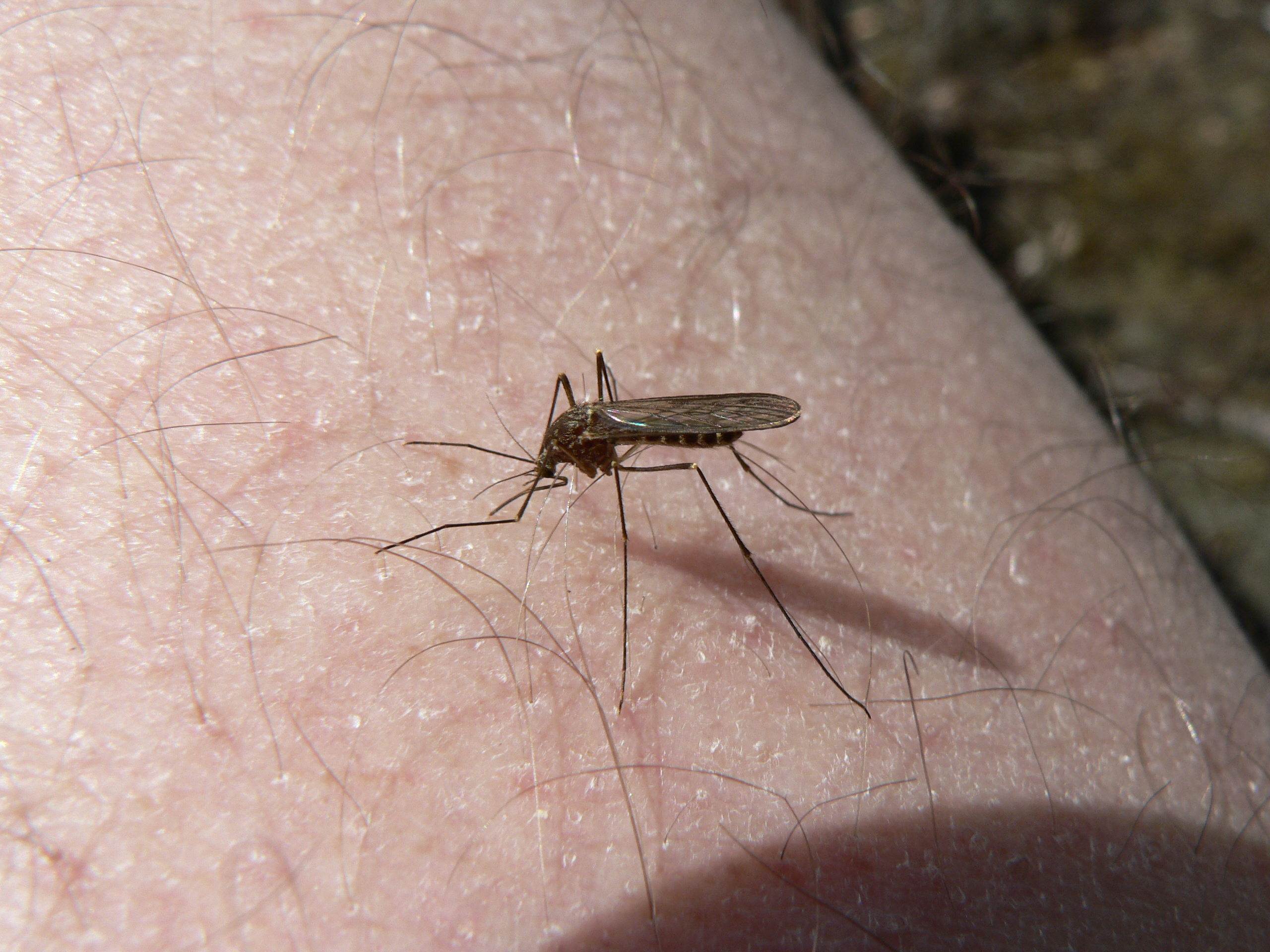

Scientific classification
- Kingdom: Animalia
- Phylum: Arthropoda
- Class: Insecta
- Order: Diptera
- Family: Culicidae
- Genus: Culiseta
- Species: C. impatiens

Binomial name
- Culiseta impatiens (Walker, 1848)

Synonyms
- Culex absobrinus Felt, 1904; Culex impatiens Walker, 1848; Culex pinguis Walker In Lord, 1866

= Culiseta impatiens =

Species of fly

Culiseta impatiens is a species of mosquito in the family Culicidae.
