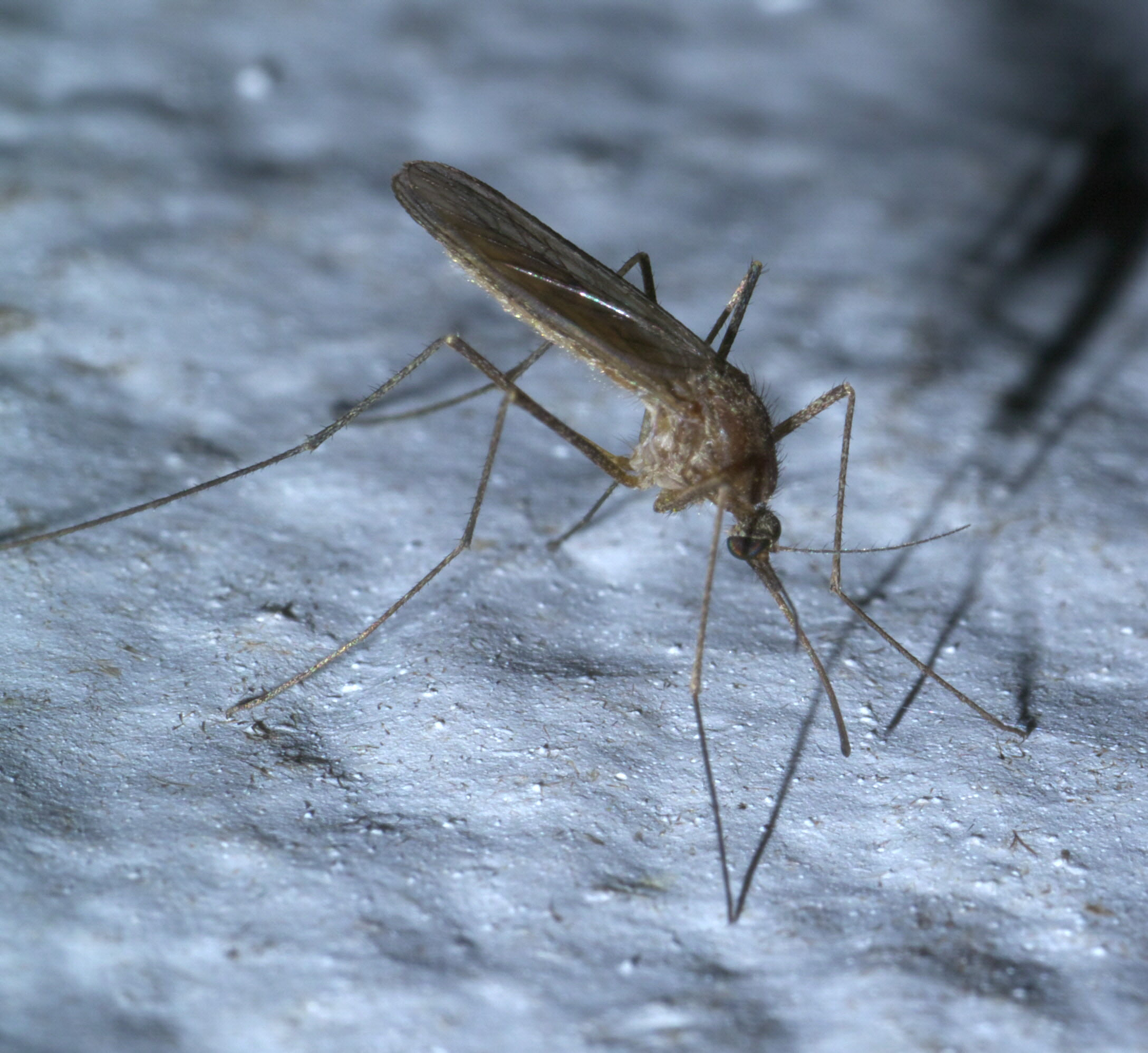

Scientific classification
- Domain: Eukaryota
- Kingdom: Animalia
- Phylum: Arthropoda
- Class: Insecta
- Order: Diptera
- Family: Culicidae
- Genus: Culiseta
- Species: C. inornata

Binomial name
- Culiseta inornata (Williston, 1893)

Synonyms
- Culex inornatus Williston, 1893; Culex magnipennis Felt, 1904

= Culiseta inornata =

Species of fly

Culiseta inornata, the winter marsh mosquito, or the unadorned American cool weather mosquito is a species of mosquito in the family Culicidae. This species is found in southern California.
