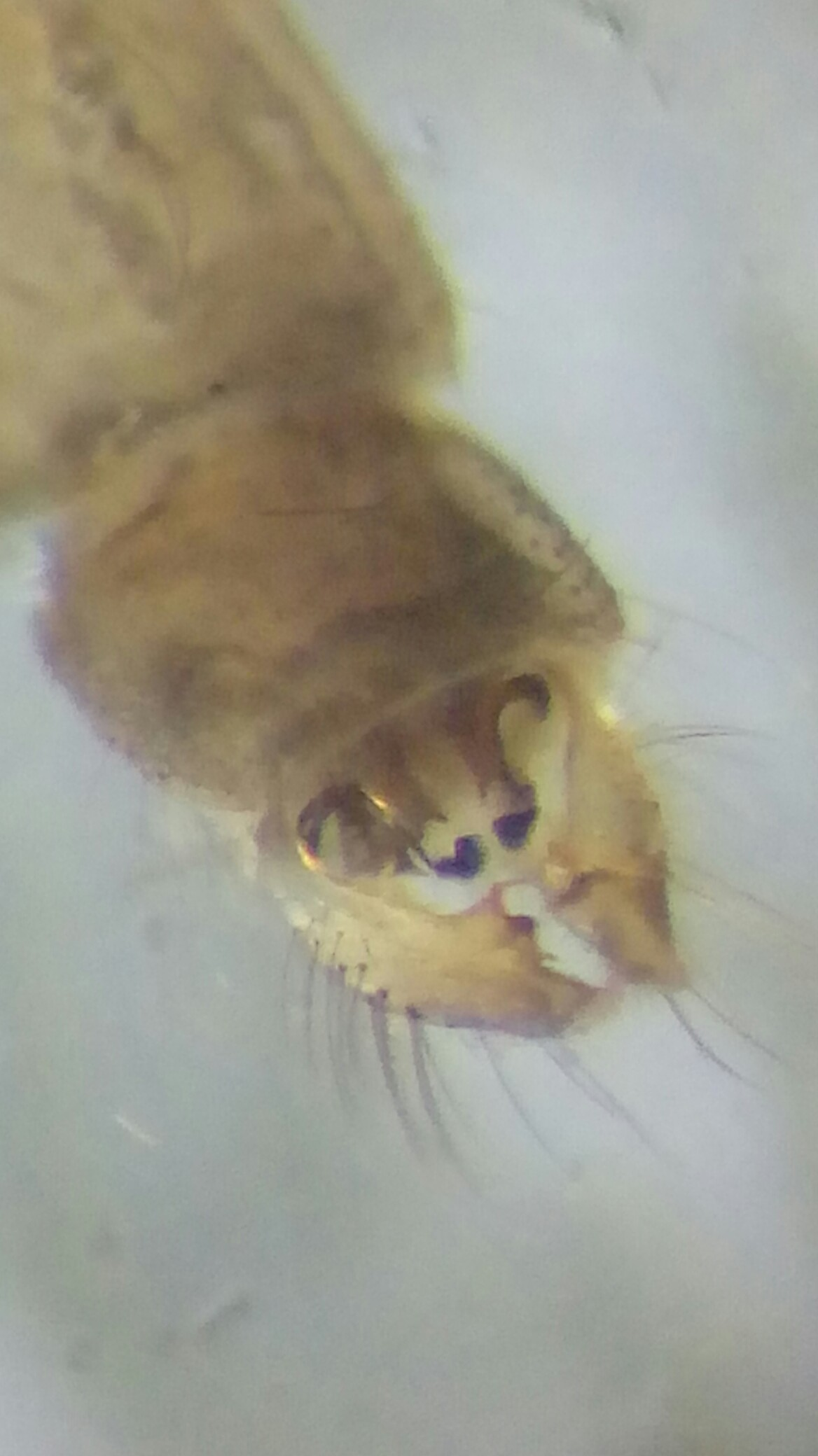
- Culex torrentium hypopygium. The ventral arm of paraproct is long and recurved

Scientific classification
- Kingdom: Animalia
- Phylum: Arthropoda
- Class: Insecta
- Order: Diptera
- Family: Culicidae
- Genus: Culex
- Species: C. torrentium

Binomial name
- Culex torrentium Martini, 1925

= Culex torrentium =

Species of mosquito

Culex torrentium is a species of mosquito in the family Culicidae. This species has a wide distribution in the temperate Palaearctic region.

== Description ==
The species is very similar to Culex pipiens. The most reliable characteristics for distinguishing Culex torrentium from Culex pipiens are found in males, namely in the hypopygium. The dorsal arm of paraproct is pointed and twisted at the apex (not blunt as in Culex pipiens). The ventral arm of paraproct is long and recurved.

== Distribution ==
Culex torrentium is found in Palaearctic. In a group of two sympatric species, Culex pipiens and Culex torrentium, proportion of Culex torrentium is increased from South to North. In Leningrad Region of Russia, Culex torrentium is less abundant species than Culex pipiens, based on preliminary studies.
