= La Crosse encephalitis =

Human disease

- Specialty: Infectious diseases

La Crosse encephalitis is an encephalitis caused by the La Crosse virus which has a mosquito vector (Ochlerotatus triseriatus synonym Aedes triseriatus).

La Crosse encephalitis virus (LACV) is one of a group of mosquito-transmitted viruses that can cause encephalitis, or inflammation of the brain. LAC encephalitis is rare; in the United States, about 80–100 LACV disease cases are reported each year, although it is believed to be under-reported due to minimal symptoms experienced by many of those affected.

== Signs and symptoms ==
It takes 5 to 15 days after the bite of an infected mosquito to develop symptoms of LACV disease. Most people infected with the virus do not have symptoms. Symptoms may include nausea, headache, vomiting and fever in milder cases.

Severe disease occurs most commonly in children under the age of 16 and is characterized by, and seizures, coma, paralysis and permanent brain damage and a variety of neurological sequelae after recovery. Death from LAC encephalitis occurs in less than 1% of clinical cases. In many clinical settings, pediatric cases presenting with CNS involvement are routinely screened for herpes simplex or enteroviral causes. Since there is no specific treatment for LAC encephalitis, physicians often do not request the tests required to specifically identify LAC virus, and the cases are reported as aseptic meningitis or viral encephalitis of unknown cause.

As with many infections, the very young, the very old and the immunocompromised are at a higher risk of developing severe symptoms.

== Cause ==
La Crosse virus

Virus classification
- (unranked): Virus
- Realm: Riboviria
- Kingdom: Orthornavirae
- Phylum: Negarnaviricota
- Class: Bunyaviricetes
- Order: Elliovirales
- Family: Peribunyaviridae
- Genus: Orthobunyavirus
- Species: Orthobunyavirus lacrosseense

Synonyms
- La Crosse orthobunyavirus

The La Crosse encephalitis virus is a type of arthropod-borne called a bunyavirus. Bunyaviruses are mainly arboviruses.

Most cases of LAC encephalitis occur in children under 16 years of age. LAC virus is a zoonotic pathogen cycled between the daytime-biting treehole mosquito, Aedes triseriatus, and vertebrate amplifier hosts (chipmunks, tree squirrels) in deciduous forest habitats. The virus is maintained over the winter by transovarial transmission in mosquito eggs. If the female mosquito is infected, she may lay eggs that carry the virus, and the adults coming from those eggs may be able to transmit the virus to chipmunks and to humans.

Anyone bitten by a mosquito in an area where the virus is circulating can get infected with LACV. The risk is highest for people who live, work or recreate in woodland habitats, because of greater exposure to potentially infected mosquitoes.

== Prevention ==
People reduce the chance of getting infected with LACV by preventing mosquito bites. There is no vaccine or preventive drug.

Prevention measures against LACV include reducing exposure to mosquito bites. Use repellent such as DEET and picaridin, while spending time outside, especially at during the daytime from dawn until dusk. Aedes triseriatus mosquitoes that transmit (LACV) are most active during the day. Wear long sleeves, pants and socks while outdoors. Ensure all screens are in good condition to prevent mosquitoes from entering your home. Aedes triseriatus prefer treeholes to lay eggs in. Also, remove stagnant water such as old tires, birdbaths, flower pots, and barrels.

== Treatment ==
No specific therapy is available at present for La Crosse encephalitis, and management is limited to alleviating the symptoms and balancing fluids and electrolyte levels. Intravenous ribavirin is effective against La Crosse encephalitis virus in the laboratory, and several studies in patients with severe, brain biopsy confirmed, La Crosse encephalitis are ongoing.

In a trial with 15 children being infected with La Crosse viral encephalitis were treated at certain phases with ribavirin (RBV). RBV appeared to be safe at moderate doses. At escalated doses of RBV, adverse events occurred and then the trial was discontinued. Nonetheless, this was the largest study of antiviral treatment for La Crosse encephalitis.

== Epidemiology ==
La Crosse encephalitis was discovered in 1965, after the virus was isolated from stored brain and spinal tissue of a child who died of an unknown infection in La Crosse, Wisconsin in 1960. It occurs in the Appalachian and Midwestern regions of the United States. Recently there has been an increase of cases in the southeastern United States. An explanation for this may be that the mosquito Aedes albopictus is also an efficient vector of La Crosse virus. Aedes albopictus is a species that has entered the US and spread across the SE of the US and replaced Aedes aegypti in most areas (which is not an efficient vector of LAC).

Historically, most cases of LAC encephalitis occur in the upper Midwestern states (Minnesota, Wisconsin, Iowa, Illinois, Indiana, and Ohio). Recently, more cases are being reported from states in the mid-Atlantic (West Virginia, Virginia and North Carolina) and southeastern (Alabama and Mississippi) regions of the country. It has long been suspected that LAC encephalitis has a broader distribution and a higher incidence in the eastern United States, but is under-reported because the causal agent is often not specifically identified.

LAC encephalitis cases occur primarily from late spring through early fall, but in subtropical areas where the mosquito is found (e.g., the Gulf states), rare cases can occur in winter.

According to the CDC, between 2004 and 2013 there were 787 total cases of La Crosse encephalitis and 11 deaths in the U.S.

Looking at the distribution of cases across the United States by state, between 2004 and 2013 the most cases of La Crosse encephalitis was in North Carolina. North Carolina had 184 total cases, followed by Ohio with 178 total cases.

== Related conditions ==
Similar diseases that are spread by mosquitoes include Western and Eastern equine encephalitis, Japanese encephalitis, Saint Louis encephalitis and West Nile virus.
