= Transovarial transmission =

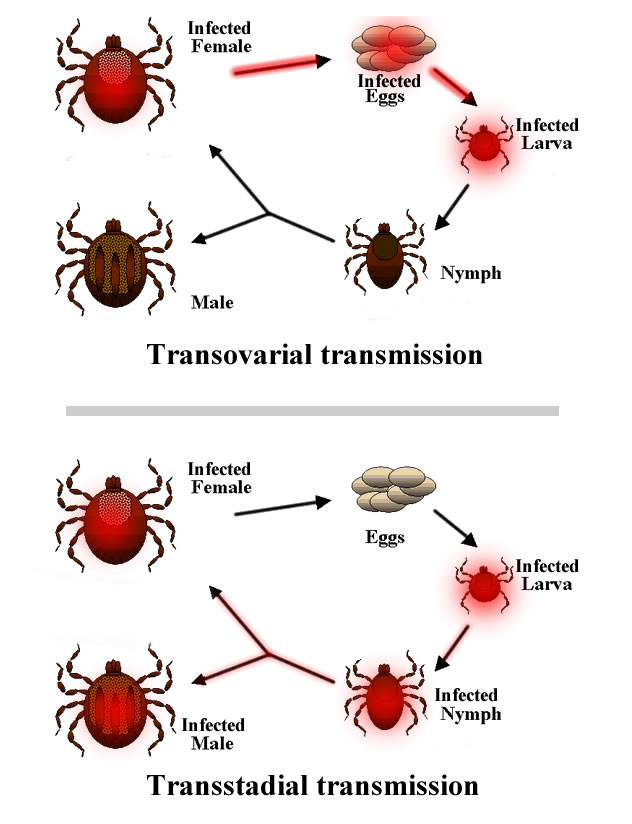
Transovarial and transstadial transmission of the Ixodes tick

Transovarial or transovarian transmission (transmission from parent to offspring via the ovaries) occurs in certain arthropod vectors as they transmit pathogens from parent to offspring. This process, used by a wide variety of parasites, is also known as vertical transmission.

For example, Rickettsia rickettsii, carried within ticks, is passed on from parent to offspring tick by transovarial transmission. This is in contrast to parasites such as Rickettsia prowazekii, which are not passed on by transovarian transmission, as they would kill the vector that carries it (in this case, the human louse). Other examples of parasites that use this mechanism of transmission include the aedes mosquito vector of the yellow fever virus and in phlebotomine sandflies that transmit pappataci fever.

Richard Dawkins in The Extended Phenotype notes that "bacterial endosymbionts of insects which are transmitted transovarially" share an interest in the "success of their host's gametes ... as well as the survival of their host's body." In this case, "the interest of the host genes and parasite genes might not be quite identical, but they would..... be very much closer than the case of fluke and snail." where host and parasite have different means of propagation into the next generation, and therefore more divergent interests.

== See also ==
- Transstadial transmission
