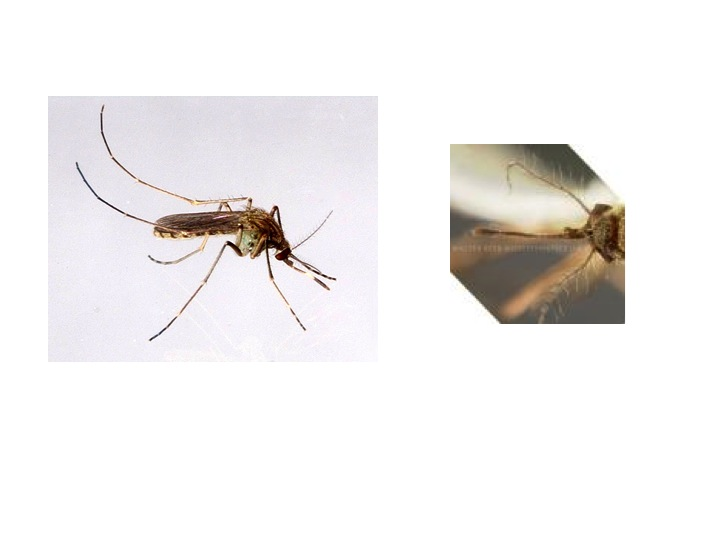

Scientific classification
- Kingdom: Animalia
- Phylum: Arthropoda
- Class: Insecta
- Order: Diptera
- Family: Culicidae
- Genus: Culex
- Species: C. tritaeniorhynchus

Binomial name
- Culex tritaeniorhynchus Giles, 1901

Synonyms
- Culex biroi Theobald, 1905; Culex summorosus Dyar, 1920

= Culex tritaeniorhynchus =

Species of mosquito

Culex (Culex) tritaeniorhynchus is a species of mosquito and is the main vector of the disease Japanese encephalitis. This mosquito is a native of northern Asia, and parts of Africa (northeast and sub-Saharan). Females target large animals for blood extraction, including cattle and swine, and are strongly anthropophilic.

== Habitat ==
The larval habitat of Culex tritaeniorhynchus primarily consists of low lying water logged areas such as grasses and fallow rice fields, but this species can also be found in wells, ponds, ditches and has been reported in urban environments in close proximity to human populations, such as water storage containers in houses. Culex tritaeniorhynchus is extremely common and widespread. It can be found in locations where the annual mean temperature ranges from 8.2 - 28.9°C, with elevations of a maximum 838m above sea level. Recorded presence of Culex tritaeniorhynchus through surveys and mosquito collections list the species as being present in Bangladesh, Cambodia, India, Indonesia, Malaysia, Myanmar, Nepal, Singapore, Sri Lanka, Thailand and Viet Nam. Attempts have been made to model the distribution of Culex tritaeniorhynchus using species distribution models; the predicted geographic distribution of the vector in 2011 can be seen below, however, the species may have expanded its distribution in current years due to changes in global climate.

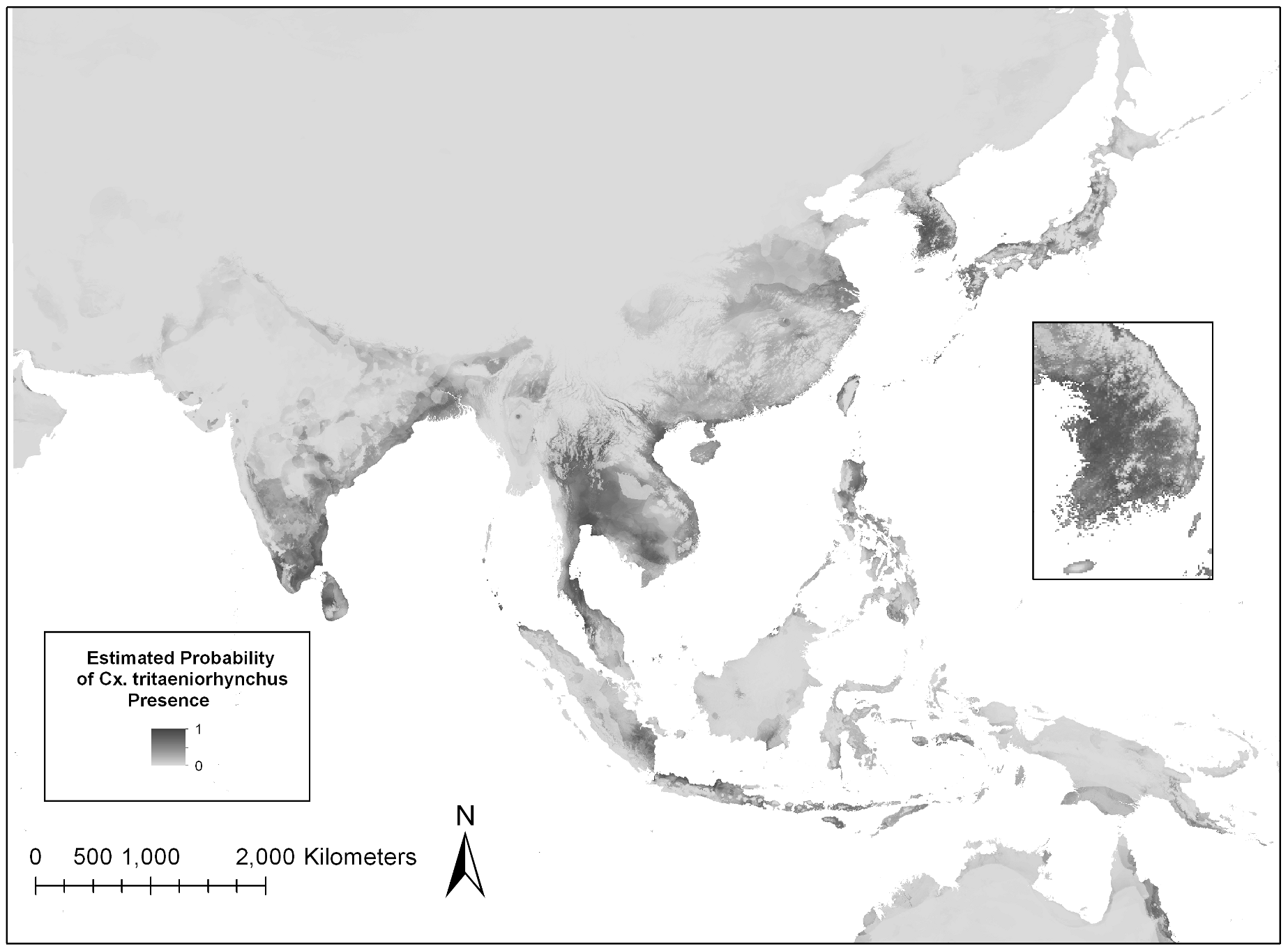
Darker areas indicate areas that are likely to have suitable habitat for this vector species while lighter areas indicate areas of that are less suitable for the vector.

== Morphology and biology ==
Culex tritaeniorhynchus is part of the Culex vishnui subgroup, which also includes Culex pseudovishnui and Culex vishnui. As the species are very morphologically similar, it is often difficult to identify the adult specimens collected from the field. Culex tritaeniorhynchus is a relatively small, reddish brown species. It can be identified by the dark brown scaling on the vertex and scutum, the accessory pale patches basal to the pale band on the ventral surface of the proboscis, and the narrow apical dark ring on the hind femur.

=== Biting habits ===
Adult emergence typically commences around mid-afternoon, and reaches a maximum around dusk. Culex tritaeniorhynchus generally has a biphasic biting profile - with feeding peaking around 7pm, declining throughout the midnight hours, then peaking again around 3am. Periodicity can change dramatically depending on the location, season and climate; further studies are required to determine habits of this vector at each of its different distributions as information on biting activity of vectors can play a vital role in personal protection measures, vector control and biting prevention. Culex tritaeniorhynchus is predominantly an exophilic species which rest outdoors after taking a blood meal, however, this also varies based on geographic location.
