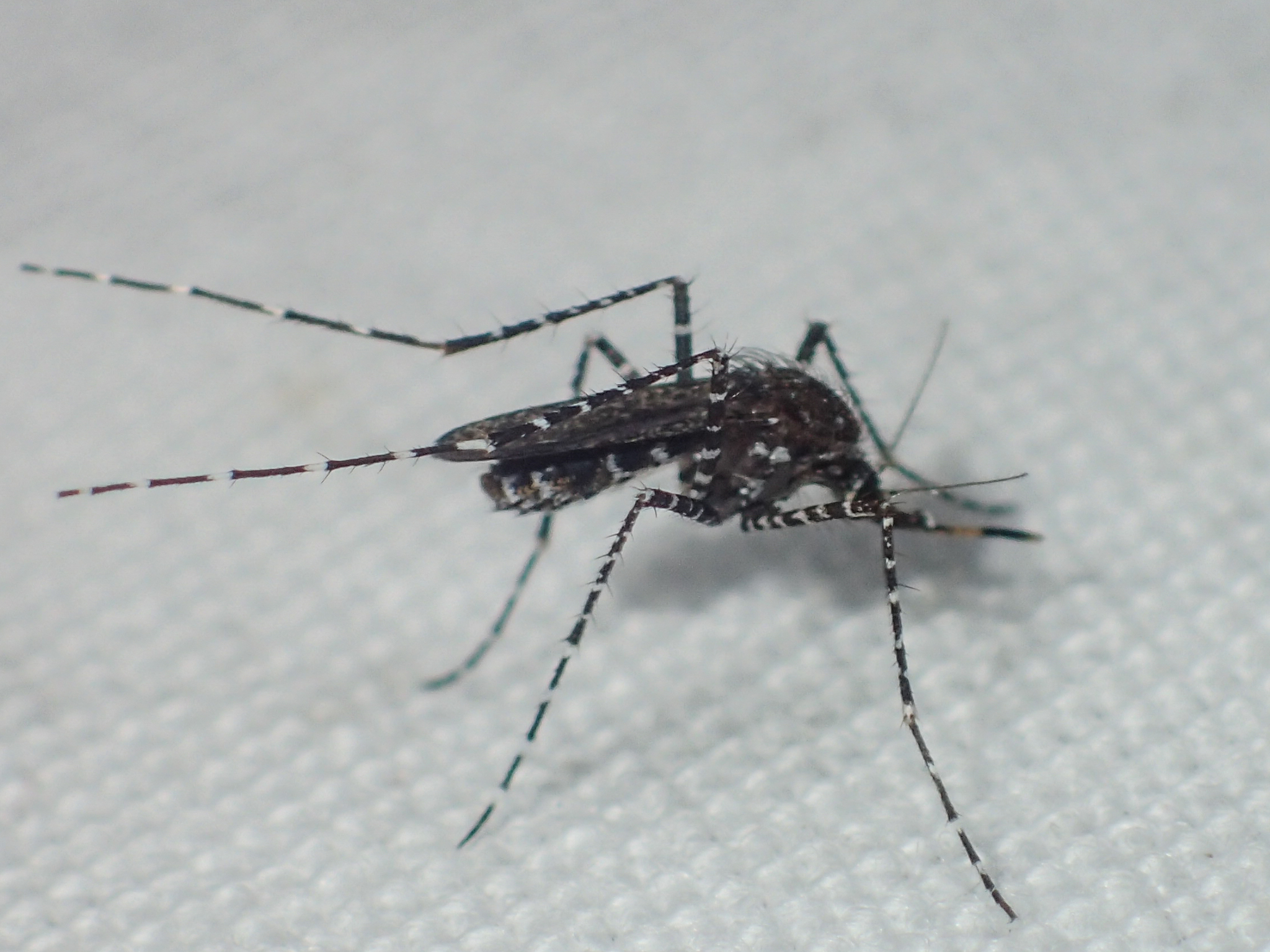

Scientific classification
- Kingdom: Animalia
- Phylum: Arthropoda
- Class: Insecta
- Order: Diptera
- Family: Culicidae
- Genus: Aedes
- Subgenus: Finlaya
- Species: A. poicilius

Binomial name
- Aedes poicilius Theobald, 1903

= Aedes poicilius =

Species of mosquito

Aedes poicilius is a species of mosquito from the Aedes genus.

== Range ==
Aedes poicilius can be found in The Philippines in regions such as Sorsogon Province in the Bicol Region and Panay Island.

== Habitat ==
This species is particularly abundant in areas near plantations and rural environments, where they can achieve high densities. These mosquitoes exhibit both indoor and outdoor biting behavior and are active throughout the day and night, with slight peaks during specific evening hours.

== Medical importance ==
Aedes poicilius is a vector of Wuchereria bancrofti, the parasite responsible for Bancroftian filariasis.
