= Culex pseudovishnui =

Scientific classification
- Kingdom: Animalia
- Phylum: Arthropoda
- Class: Insecta
- Order: Diptera
- Family: Culicidae
- Genus: Culex
- Species: C. pseudovishnui

Binomial name
- Culex pseudovishnui Colless, 1957

Synonyms
- Culex neovishnui Lien, 1968

Species of mosquito

Culex (Culex) pseudovishnui is a species complex of mosquito belonging to the Culex vishnui group of the genus Culex. It is found in Bangladesh, Cambodia, China, Hong Kong, India, Indonesia, Iran, Iraq, Japan, South Korea, Laos, Macau, Malaysia, Nepal, New Guinea (Island); Papua New Guinea, Pakistan, Philippines, Singapore, Sri Lanka, Thailand, Taiwan and Vietnam. It is a major vector of West Nile virus, and Japanese encephalitis virus
