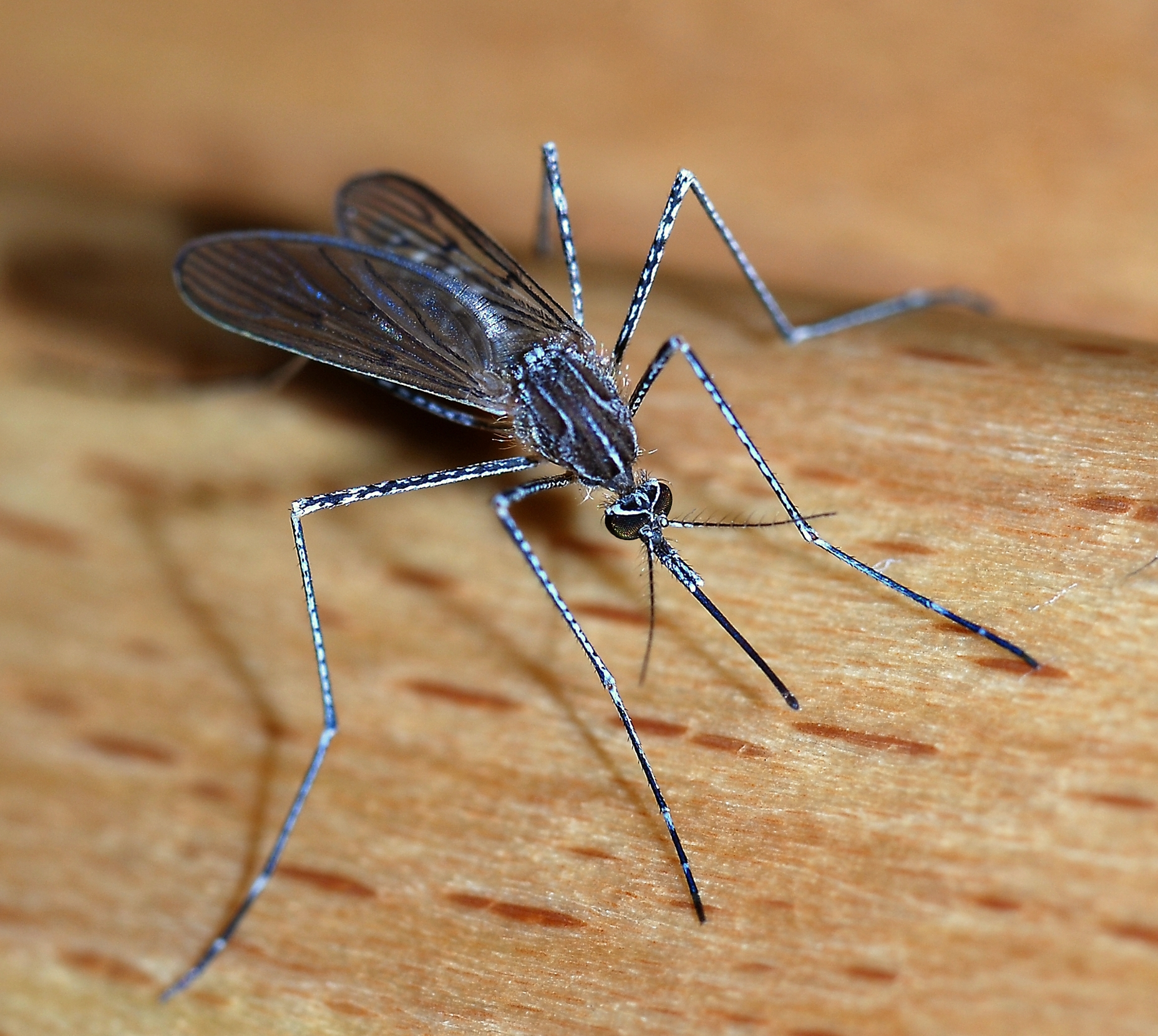
- Culiseta longiareolata

Scientific classification
- Kingdom: Animalia
- Phylum: Arthropoda
- Clade: Pancrustacea
- Class: Insecta
- Order: Diptera
- Family: Culicidae
- Subfamily: Culicinae

= Culicinae =

Subfamily of flies

The Culicinae are the most extensive subfamily of mosquitoes (Culicidae) and have species in every continent except Antarctica, but are highly concentrated in tropical areas. Mosquitoes are best known as parasites to many vertebrate animals and vectors for disease. They are holometabolous insects, and most species lay their eggs in stagnant water, to benefit their aquatic larval stage.

== Introduction ==
The subfamily Culicinae is the largest subfamily of Culicidae, a family of Nematocera dipterans. There are 3,046 species of Culicinae mosquitoes, in 108 genera and 11 tribes. Members of the Culicinae subfamily are small flies with fore wings for flight and hind wings reduced to halteres for balance. The mosquitoes also have long, slender, legs and proboscis-style mouth parts for feeding on vertebrate blood or plant fluids. Only the females are blood feeders, requiring a high quality protein meal before they can oviposit. Because the mosquitoes are well adapted for finding hosts, the females can move quickly from one blood meal to another, and when injecting their saliva, can inject pathogens picked up from other hosts and thus efficiently spread disease.

== Lifecycle ==
Culicinae mosquitoes are holometabolous, going through four distinct life stages: egg, larva, pupa, and adult. The duration of each stage is species-specific, but all Culicinae mosquitoes are multivoltine. The egg, larval, and pupal stages are aquatic. Adults leave the water by flight to find plants or vertebrates on which to feed. Oviposition can occur in natural reservoirs of salt water or fresh water, or temporary pools, but oviposition sites are generally stagnant. All Psorophora and some Aedes species oviposit on soil where the eggs remain, unhatched, till flooded. Many species associate closely with humans, using accumulated ground water in developed areas for oviposition. Some species use plant cavities for oviposition. These species can, as larvae, drill into the plant for air.

=== Eggs ===
Culicinae eggs are laid in groups by adult females, often numbering over a hundred. Most species lay the eggs on the surface of stagnant water. The female lays the eggs vertically and side by side, held together by a sticky substance excreted to coat the eggs, head end down, creating an egg raft that is convex below and concave above with ends that are typically upturned. Species that use this form of egg-laying typically hatch as first instar larvae within a few hours of laying. Oviposition on the surface of stagnant water is most common, but some species of Aedes and all Psorophora deposit their eggs in areas that will flood. Eggs are laid and embryological development occurs, but the eggs do not hatch till flooded. After flooding, the eggs will hatch within two to three days.

=== Larvae ===
Culicinae larvae are adapted to almost every aquatic environment worldwide, excepting flowing streams and open areas of large water masses. Larvae have three body regions – head, thorax, and abdomen – as well as having compound eyes and antennae on their heads. The same body regions can be found in Culicinae adults, but the form of each region is very different in the larvae and adults. The larvae have four instars from hatching to pupation that occur over four days to two weeks. Culicinae larvae can be distinguished from larvae of other subfamilies by the presence of the posterior siphon. The siphon is used for breathing and breaks the water surface, so the larvae can take in air. Most species hang from the surface of the water, anterior end down, so the siphon stays at the water surface. Some species of Mansonia and Coquillettidia use the siphon differently, piercing underwater plants to take oxygen. Larvae eat small aquatic organisms and plant material in the water using brush-style and grinding mouth parts. A few species are predatory and have additional mouth parts for grasping. Larvae use jerks of their bodies for locomotion, combined with propulsion using the mouth bristles. They are sensitive to the conditions of the water in which they live, including light, temperature, and many other factors, and are also subject to predation and depend on aquatic vegetation to hide from predators.

=== Pupae ===
Culicinae pupae are aquatic and do not feed, but they do require air intake. All pupae must come to the water surface for air, with the exception of Mansonia and Coquillettidia species. Pupae are exarate, allowing movement of the exposed abdomen. Thrashing of the abdomen can move the pupae quickly, sideways or downward, but as soon as movement of the abdomen stops, the pupae return to the surface of the water. The pupa naturally rises to the surface of the water due to an air pocket between the wing cases that make it lighter than water. Pupation lasts as little as one day to as much as several weeks, because some diapause can occur.

=== Adults ===
Adult mosquitoes are about equal in proportions of males and females, but males emerge from the pupal stage before females. Males stay near the breeding ground and mate soon after the females emerge. Females only need to mate once, then store sperm to use over their lifetimes. After mating, adults leave the breeding ground and can fly great distances. Culicinae adults inhabit almost every environment, and both males and females feed on plant sugars. Females also feed on animal blood, which most species need before they can lay eggs. After a blood meal, females take two or more days to digest the blood before oviposition. After egglaying, females begin searching for another host for a blood meal. Different species of mosquitoes have preferences to blood meals from specific species of hosts, but can feed on other species. Adults have three body regions, with narrow membranes joining the segments, and are two to 15 mm in length. The first body region, the head, holds the large compound eyes, proboscis-style mouth parts, and plumose antennae. The antennae of males are more plumose than those of females, to catch pheromones to find a mate. The thorax is covered in scales and setae helpful in species identification. Attached to the thorax are three pairs of long, slender legs, a pair of fore wings used for flight, and hind wings reduced to halteres for balance. The abdomen is slender, but membranous so it can swell when feeding. The abdomen has 10 segments, but only eight are visible. The last two segments are reduced and used for reproduction. The lifespan of adult Culicinae can vary greatly based on environment, predation, and pest control.

== Feeding ==
Culicinae adults of both sexes feed on plant sugars, such as nectar. Feeding on blood is only practiced by females, to gain a high-protein meal for egg production. The mouth parts of females are adapted for piercing the skin of hosts, whereas the similar mouth parts of males are incapable of piercing skin. When feeding on blood, females use their large compound eyes to initially find a host. When near a host, females can detect changes in light and odors. They can then land and use their probosces to feel for a place to bite. To feed, they pierce the skin and inject saliva containing an anticoagulant and an anesthetic. The anesthetic reduces pain so the host does not detect the bite, and the anticoagulant prevents blood from clotting so they can continue to feed. Pathogenic organisms contained in the saliva injection by the female mosquitoes can quickly spread diseases.

== Taxonomy ==
The subfamily Culicinae has 3,046 species in 108 genera that are sorted into 11 tribes. The tribes and genera they contain are shown below, with the number of species in each genus noted.

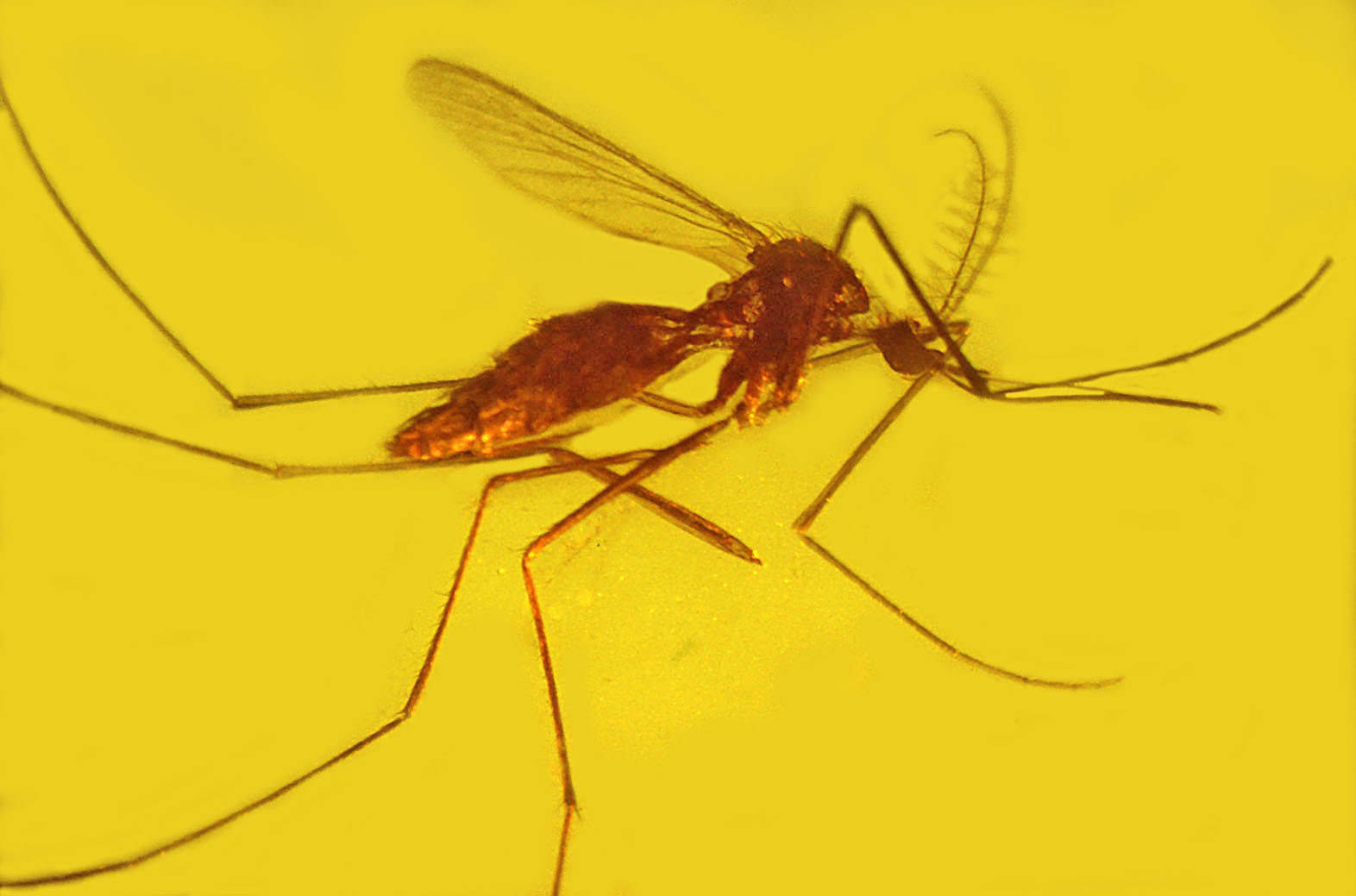
Culicine mosquito in 15 million year old amber

Aedeomyiini;

- Aedomyia (7 species)

=== Aedini ===
- Abraedes (1)
- Acartomyia (3)
- Aedes (966)
- 'Aedes' sensu auctorum (4)
- Aedimorphus (67)
- Alanstonea (2)
- Albuginosus (9)
- Armigeres (58)
- Ayurakitia (2)
- Aztecaedes (1)
- Belkinius (1)
- Bifidistylus (2)
- Borichinda (1)
- Bothaella (6)
- Bruceharrisonius (8)
- Cancraedes (10)
- Catageiomyia (28)
- Catatassomyia (1)
- Christophersiomyia (5)
- Collessius (9)
- Cornetius (1)
- Dahliana (3)
- Danielsia (3)
- Dendroskusea (5)
- Diceromyia (14)
- Dobrotworskyius (7)
- Downsiomyia (30)
- Edwardsaedes (3)
- Elpeytonius (2)
- Eretmapodites (48)
- Finlaya (36)
- Fredwardsius (1)
- Georgecraigius (3)
- Geoskusea (10)
- Gilesius (2)
- Gymnometopa (1)
- Haemagogus (28)
- Halaedes (3)
- Heizmannia (38)
- Himalaius (2)
- Hopkinsius (7)
- Howardina (34)
- Huaedes (3)
- Hulecoeteomyia (13)
- Indusius (1)
- Isoaedes (1)
- Jarnellius (5)
- Jihlienius (3)
- Kenknightia (12)
- Leptosomatomyia (1)
- Levua (1)
- Lewnielsenius (1)
- Lorrainea (5)
- Luius (1)
- Macleaya (11)
- Molpemyia (3)
- Mucidus (14)
- Neomelaniconion (28)
- Ochlerotatus (197)
- 'Ochlerotatus' sensu auctorum (69)
- Opifex (2)
- Paraedes (8)
- Patmarksia (13)
- Petermattinglyius (5)
- Phagomyia (16)
- Polyleptiomyia (2)
- Pseudarmigeres (5)
- Psorophora (48)
- Rampamyia (3)
- Rhinoskusea (4)
- Sallumia (2)
- Scutomyia (9)
- Skusea (4)
- Stegomyia (127)
- Tanakaius (2)
- Tewarius (4)
- Udaya (3)
- Vansomerenis (3)
- Verrallina (95)
- Zavortinkius (11)
- Zeugnomyia (4)

=== Culicini ===
- Culex (844)
- Deinocerites (18)
- Galindomyia (1)
- Lutzia (8)
- Neoculicites (3)

Culisetini

- Culiseta (37)

=== Ficalbiini ===
1. Ficalbia (8)
2. Mimomyia (45)

Hodgesiini

- Hodgesia (11)

=== Mansoniini ===
1. Coquillettidia (57)
2. Mansonia (25)

Orthopodomyiini

- Orthopodomyia (35)

=== Sabethini ===
1. Cretosabethes (1)
2. Isostomyia (4)
3. Johnbelkinia (3)
4. Kimia (5)
5. Limatus (8)
6. Malaya (12)
7. Maorigoeldia (1)
8. Onirion (7)
9. Runchomyia (7)
10. Sabethes (39)
11. Shannoniana (3)
12. Topomyia (60)
13. Trichoprosopon (17)
14. Tripteroides (122)
15. Wyeomyia (139)

Toxorhynchitini

- Toxorhynchites (88)

Uranotaeniini

- Uranotaenia (267)
