= Mansonia uniformis =

Scientific classification
- Kingdom: Animalia
- Phylum: Arthropoda
- Class: Insecta
- Order: Diptera
- Family: Culicidae
- Genus: Mansonia
- Species: M. uniformis

Binomial name
- Mansonia uniformis (Theobald, 1901)

Synonyms
- Mansonia australiensis Giles; Mansonia marquesensis Dyar; Mansonia reversus Theobald

Species of mosquito

Mansonia (Mansonioides) uniformis is a species of zoophilic mosquito belonging to the genus Mansonia.

== Distribution ==
Nearly cosmopolitan distribution. It is found in Angola, Australia, Bangladesh, Benin, Botswana, Burkina Faso, Cambodia, Central African Republic, China, Comoros, Côte d'Ivoire, Ethiopia, Gabon, Gambia, Ghana, Guam, Hong Kong, India, Indonesia, Iran, Japan, Kenya, South Korea, Liberia, Madagascar, Malawi, Malaysia, Mali, Mozambique, Myanmar, Nepal, New Guinea (Island); Papua New Guinea, Niger, Nigeria, Pakistan, Philippines, Senegal, Sierra Leone, Solomon Islands, South Africa, Sri Lanka, Sudan, Taiwan, Tanzania, Thailand, Timor, Uganda, Vietnam, and Zambia.

== Description ==
The female is a medium-sized mosquito with mottled brownish appearance. Proboscis mottled. Scutum with narrow golden scales. Wings also mottled with broad dark and pale scales on all veins. The mosquito mostly attacks humans and birds and bites mostly at night and during shady days. Larva can be found in unshaded open swamps.

== Medical importance ==
Mansonia uniformis can be a vector of human diseases, such as Ross River virus, Kunjin virus, Murray Valley encephalitis, and lymphatic filariasis.
