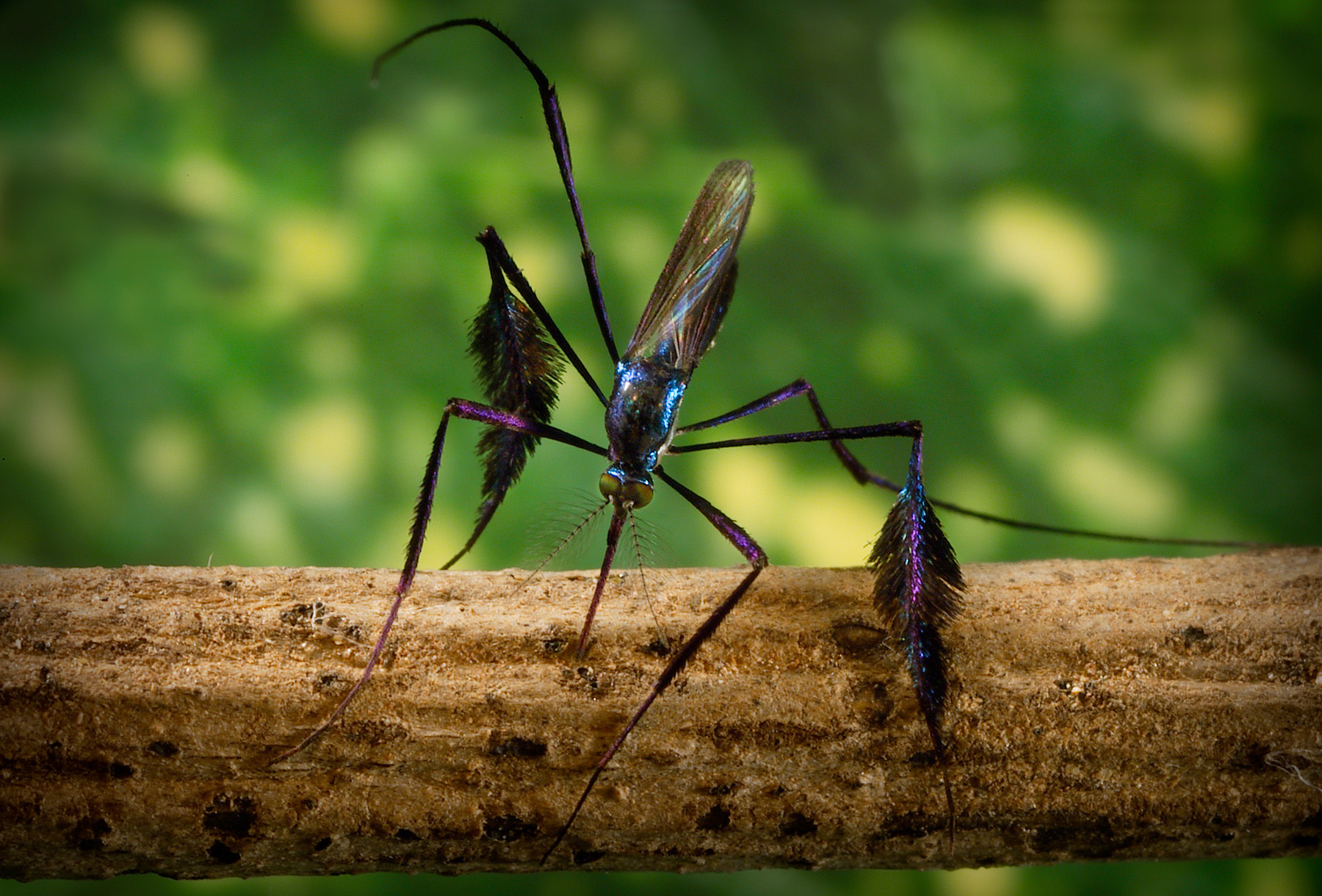
- Female Sabethes cyaneus

Scientific classification
- Kingdom: Animalia
- Phylum: Arthropoda
- Class: Insecta
- Order: Diptera
- Family: Culicidae
- Subfamily: Culicinae
- Tribe: Sabethini
- Genus: Sabethes; Robineau-Desvoidy, 1827

Type species
- Sabethes locuples Jean-Baptiste Robineau-Desvoidy, 1827

= Sabethes =

Genus of flies

Sabethes or canopy mosquitos are primarily an arboreal genus, breeding in plant cavities. The type species is Sabethes locuples, first described by Jean-Baptiste Robineau-Desvoidy in 1827.

They are generally conspicuously ornamented with shining metallic scales. The antennae of the females of some Sabethes species have long, dense, flagellar whorls resembling those of the males of most other genera of mosquitoes.

Sabethes species mosquitoes occur in Central and South America.

== Medical importance ==
Sabethes chloropterus has been found infected with St. Louis encephalitis virus and Ilhéus virus, and transmits yellow fever virus to humans.

== Subgenera and species ==
As listed by the Walter Reed Biosystematics Unit:

- Subgenus Davismyia Lane and Cerqueira
  - Sabethes (Davismyia) petrocchiae Shannon and Del Ponte (syn.: Sabethes (Davismyia) monoleua Martini)
- Subgenus Nomina Dubia 13
  - Sabethes lutzii Theobald nomen dubium
- Subgenus Peytonulus Harbach
  - Sabethes (Peytonulus) aurescens Lutz
  - Sabethes (Peytonulus) fabricii Lane and Cerqueira
  - Sabethes (Peytonulus) gorgasi Duret
  - Sabethes (Peytonulus) hadrognathus Harbach
  - Sabethes (Peytonulus) identicus Dyar and Knab (syn.: Sabethes (Peytonulus) lutzianus Lane and Cerqueira)

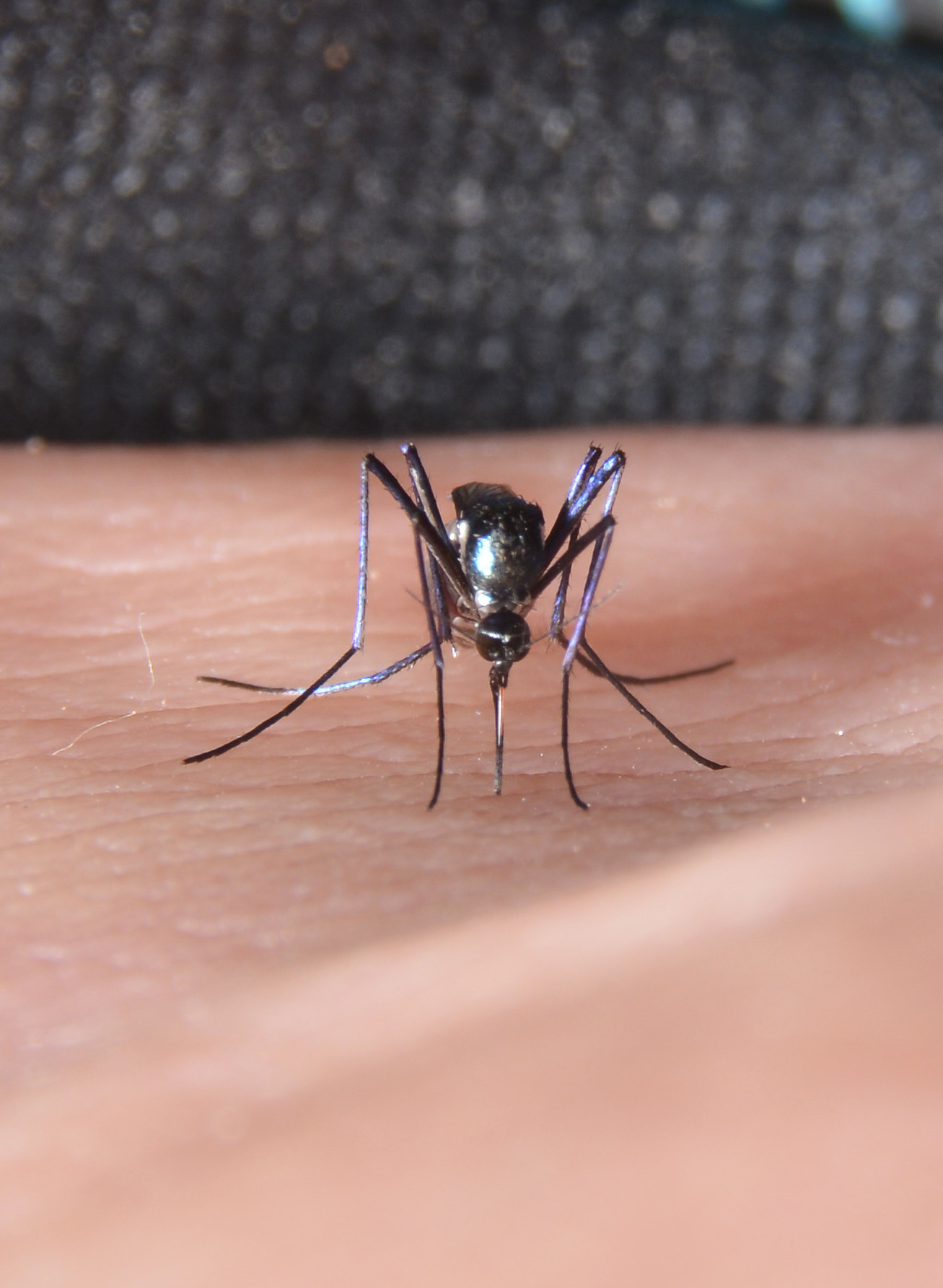
S. identicus

  - Sabethes (Peytonulus) ignotus Harbach
  - Sabethes (Peytonulus) luxodens Hall, Howard and Harbach
  - Sabethes (Peytonulus) paradoxus Harbach
  - Sabethes (Peytonulus) soperi Lane and Cerqueira
  - Sabethes (Peytonulus) undosus (Coquillett)
  - Sabethes (Peytonulus) whitmani Lane and Cerqueira
  - Sabethes (Peytonulus) xenismus Harbach
- Subgenus Sabethes Robineau-Desvoidy
  - Sabethes (Sabethes) albiprivus Theobald (syn.: Sabethes (Sabethes) albiprivatus Lutz, Sabethes (Sabethes) albiprivatus Theobald, and Sabethes (Sabethes) neivai Petrocchi)

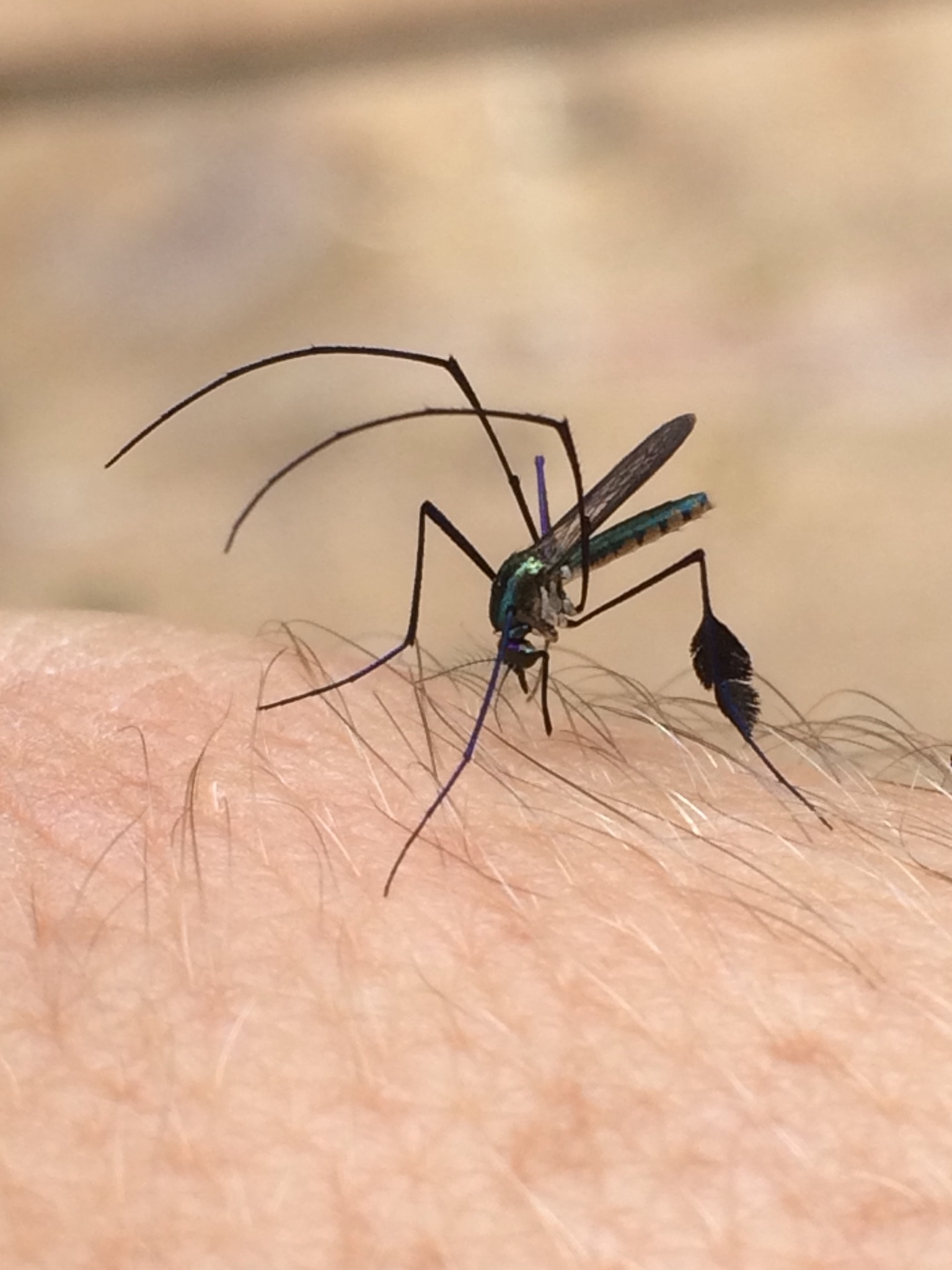
S. albiprivus

  - Sabethes (Sabethes) amazonicus Gordon and Evans

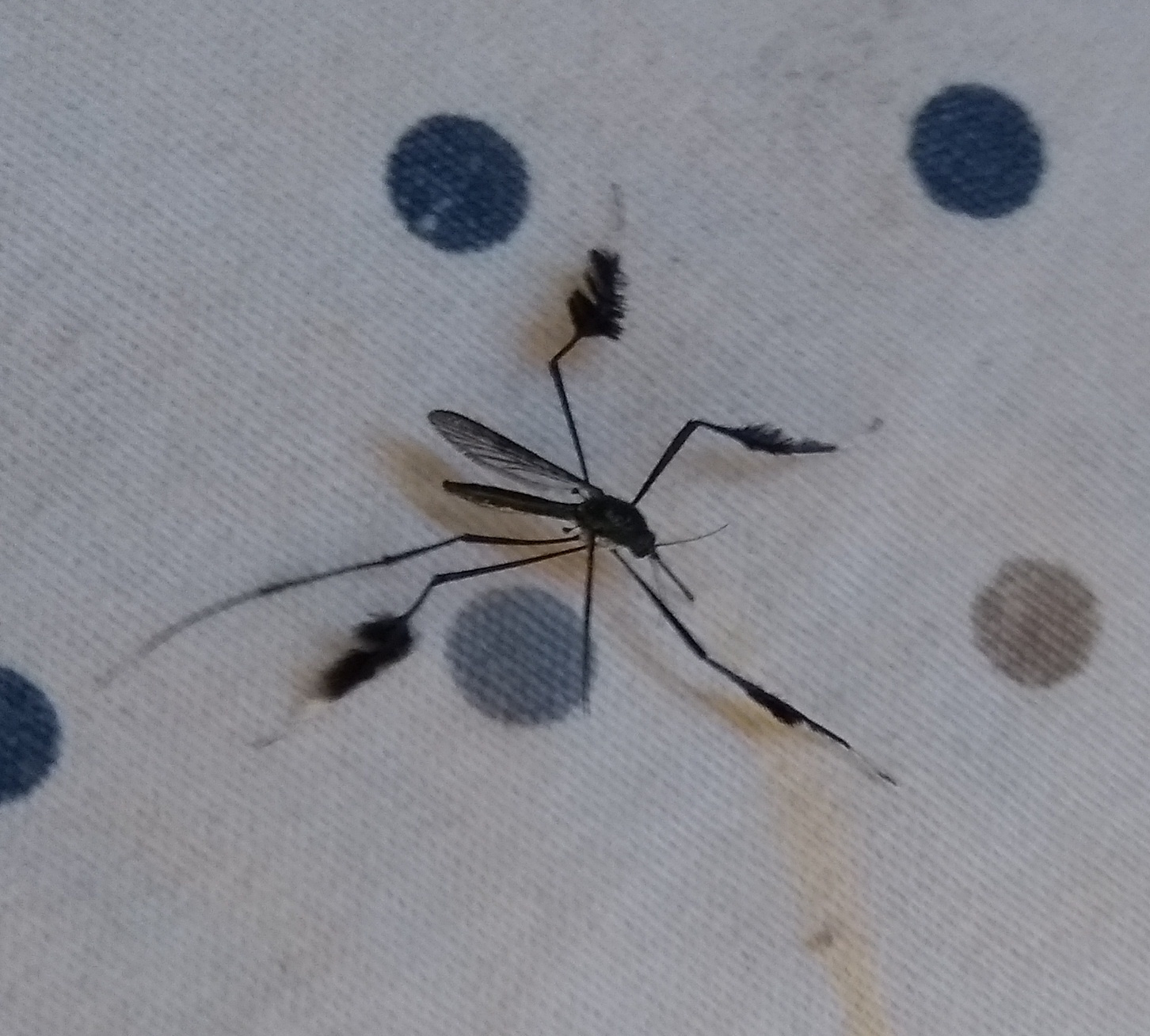
S. amazonicus

(syn.: Sabethes (Sabethes) happleri Bonne, and Sabethes (Sabethes) longfieldae Edwards)

  - Sabethes (Sabethes) batesi Lane and Cerqueira
  - Sabethes (Sabethes) belisarioi Neiva (syn.: Sabethes (Sabethes) argyronotum Edwards, Sabethes (Sabethes) goeldii Howard, Dyar, and Knab, and Sabethes (Sabethes) schausi Dyar and Knab)
  - Sabethes (Sabethes) bipartipes Dyar and Knab (syn.: Sabethes (Sabethes) chroiopus Dyar and Knab)
  - Sabethes (Sabethes) cyaneus Fabricius (syn.: Sabethes (Sabethes) locuples Robineau-Desvoidy, and Sabethes (Sabethes) remipes Wiedemann)
  - Sabethes (Sabethes) forattinii Cerqueira
  - Sabethes (Sabethes) gymnothorax Harbach and Petersen
  - Sabethes (Sabethes) lanei Cerqueira
  - Sabethes (Sabethes) nitidus Theobald
  - Sabethes (Sabethes) ortizi Vargas and Díaz Nájera
  - Sabethes (Sabethes) paraitepuyensis Anduze
  - Sabethes (Sabethes) purpureus Theobald (syn.: Sabethes (Sabethes) purpureus Peryassu, and Sabethes (Sabethes) remipusculus Dyar)
  - Sabethes (Sabethes) quasicyaneus Peryassú
  - Sabethes (Sabethes) schnusei Martini
  - Sabethes (Sabethes) shannoni Cerqueira
  - Sabethes (Sabethes) spixi Cerqueira
  - Sabethes (Sabethes) tarsopus Dyar and Knab

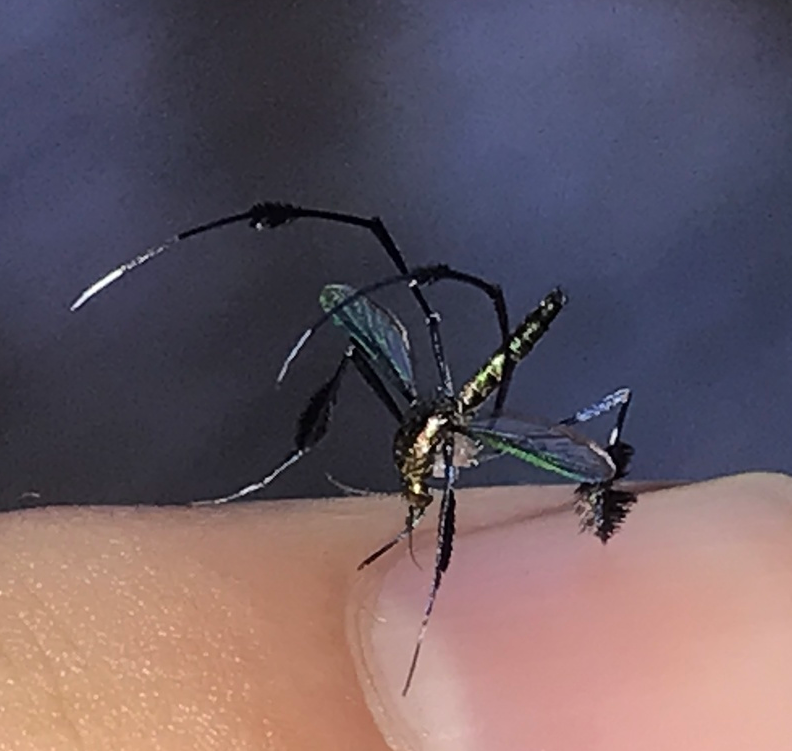
S. tarsopus

- Subgenus Sabethinus Lutz
  - Sabethes (Sabethinus) idiogenes Harbach
  - Sabethes (Sabethinus) intermedius Lutz
  - Sabethes (Sabethinus) melanonymphe Dyar (syn.: Sabethes (Sabethinus) albiprivatus Theobald)
  - Sabethes (Sabethinus) xhyphydes Harbach
- Subgenus Sabethoides Theobald
  - Sabethes (Sabethoides) chloropterus von Humboldt (syn.: Sabethes (Sabethoides) confusus Theobald, Sabethes (Sabethoides) imperfectus Bonne-Wepster and Bonne, and Sabethes (Sabethoides) rangeli Surcouf and Gonzales-Rincones)
  - Sabethes (Sabethoides) conditus Moses, Howard and Harbach
  - Sabethes (Sabethoides) glaucodaemon Dyar and Shannon
  - Sabethes (Sabethoides) tridentatus Cerqueira
