= Lutzia =

Scientific classification
- Kingdom: Animalia
- Phylum: Arthropoda
- Class: Insecta
- Order: Diptera
- Family: Culicidae
- Subfamily: Culicinae
- Tribe: Culicini
- Genus: Lutzia; Theobald, 1903

Genus of flies

Lutzia is a genus of mosquitos. First described in 1903 by Frederick Vincent Theobald, it includes species whose larval stages exhibit predatory behavior. The type species is Lutzia bigoti.

== Bionomics ==
The genus includes two species with Neotropical distribution, four in Asia and Australasia, one Afrotropical, and one occurring in the Ogasawara Islands of Japan.

Laboratory experiments on predation by Lutzia (Metalutzia) fuscana under arid conditions showed that it preyed primarily on Aedes aegypti larvae, and to lesser extents on Anopheles stephensi and Culex quinquefasciatus larvae, with an average daily consumption of 18-19 larvae/day, suggesting that under the proper conditions they could be useful in reducing domestic mosquito breeding in desert environments where, due to limited water sources, mosquito vectors must share the available breeding habitat.

== Subgenera and species ==
Subgenera and species listed by the Walter Reed Biosystematics Unit:

- Subgenus Insulalutzia Tanaka
  - Lutzia shinonagai (Tanaka, Mizusawa and Saugstad)
- Subgenus Lutzia Theobald
  - Lutzia allostigma Howard, Dyar and Knab
  - Lutzia bigoti (Bellardi) (syn. L. brasiliae Dyar, and L. patersoni Shannon and Del Ponte)
- Subgenus Metalutzia Tanaka
  - Lutzia agranensis Singh and Prakash
  - Lutzia chiangmaiensis Somboon and Harbach, 2019
  - Lutzia fuscana (Wiedemann) (syn. L. concolor Robineau-Desvoidy, L. luridus Doleschall, and L. setulosus Doleschall)
  - Lutzia halifaxii (Theobald) (syn. L. aureopunctis Ludlow, L. multimaculosus Leicester, and L. raptor Edwards)
  - Lutzia tigripes (de Grandpre & de Charmoy) (syn. L. bimaculata Theobald, L. fusca Theobald, L. maculicrures Theobald, L. mombasaensis Theobald, and L. sierraleonis Theobald)
  - Lutzia vorax Edwards
