= Culex vishnui =

Scientific classification
- Kingdom: Animalia
- Phylum: Arthropoda
- Class: Insecta
- Order: Diptera
- Family: Culicidae
- Tribe: Culicini
- Genus: Culex
- Subgenus: Culex
- Species: C. vishnui

Binomial name
- Culex vishnui Theobald, 1901

Synonyms
- Culex adeloae Baisas, 1938; Culex pseudoinfula Theobald, 1911

Species of mosquito

Culex vishnui is a mosquito belonging to the Culicidae family. It is the most common vector (carrier) of the Japanese encephalitis virus (JEV) in India, Sri Lanka, Thailand, and Sarawak.

== See also ==
- Japanese encephalitis

== Identification ==
The Culex vishnui Theobald mosquito species belongs to a sub-type that also includes two other carriers of the Japanese encephalitis virus - Culex tritaeniorhynchus Giles and Culex pseudovishnui Colless. Since the females of these different species are difficult to morphologically distinguish from one another, an rDNA based diagnostic PCR is used for identification.

Morphological identification of multiple JEV carrier mosquitoes including Cx. vishnui are based on identifying specific features of the legs, abdomen, palpi, wings, proboscises, and tarsi. The identification of Cx. vishnui is confirmed by verifying that the "anterior surface of hindfemur with pale stripe does not contrast with dark scaled area".
