= Lutzia fuscana =

Scientific classification
- Kingdom: Animalia
- Phylum: Arthropoda
- Class: Insecta
- Order: Diptera
- Family: Culicidae
- Genus: Lutzia
- Subgenus: Metalutzia
- Species: L. fuscana

Binomial name
- Lutzia fuscana (Wiedemann, 1820)

Synonyms
- Culex fuscanus Wiedemann, 1820

Species of fly

Lutzia fuscana is a mosquito that is predatory in its larval stages. It has been investigated as a possible biological control agent, showing some promise where vector species share limited or specific breeding habitat. They are natural predators of disease causing mosquito larva such as Aedes aegypti, Anopheles subpictus, and Culex tritaeniorhynchus.

== Distribution ==
It is found in China, India, Indonesia and Sri Lanka

== Bionomics ==
Immature forms of Lutzia fuscana have been collected from swamps, marshes, bogs, rice fields, ditches, grassy pools, rock and flood pools, stream pools and margins, tree holes and stump holes, crab holes, artificial containers, and tire depressions.

In the laboratory, Lutzia fuscana larvae demonstrated a feeding preference for Aedes aegypti larvae, with Anopheles stephensi and Culex quinquefasciatus larvae of lower preference, consuming an average of 5-19 larvae per day.

The species has been found in Bangladesh, Cambodia, China, India, Indonesia, Japan, South Korea, Macau, Malaysia, Mariana Islands, Micronesia (Wake Island), Myanmar (Burma), Nepal, Pakistan, Palau, Philippines, Russia, Singapore, Sri Lanka, Taiwan, Thailand, Timor, and Vietnam.

== Medical importance ==
Newly emerged adults of Lutzia fuscana fed on canaries infected with Plasmodium cathemerium and P. capisirina were found to be positive for plasmodia at 6 & 1/2 to 8 & 1/2-days post-infection.
