= Sabethes lutzii =

Scientific classification
- Kingdom: Animalia
- Phylum: Arthropoda
- Class: Insecta
- Order: Diptera
- Family: Culicidae
- Genus: Sabethes
- Species: S. lutzii

Binomial name
- Sabethes lutzii (Theobald, 1903, nomen dubium)

Species of fly

Sabethes lutzii is a species name designated a "nomen dubium" i.e., a "dubious (or doubtful) name," for a mosquito specimen that remains insufficiently evidenced to be accepted as a proved species.

Sabethes lutzii was first characterized in 1903 from a damaged specimen collected in Manaós, Brazil, in a letter written by the first scientist to view it, physician Dr. Adolfo Lutz, to entomologist Dr. Frederick V. Theobald who then described it in published literature. The specimen was described as large in relative size, of a very dark blue uniform metallic color, and differing from other species by the lack of white scales marking the femurs.

Theobald indicated that the holotype specimen was in the British Museum (Natural History) collection, but it was not located there by a later researcher. More recent researchers have speculated that the holotype specimen may be represented by a slide of a mosquito wing marked "da Coll. do Dr. Lutz/XI-930/C.L." in the Instituto Oswaldo Cruz collection. However, due to the lack of certainty, the name is currently considered a nomen dubium.
