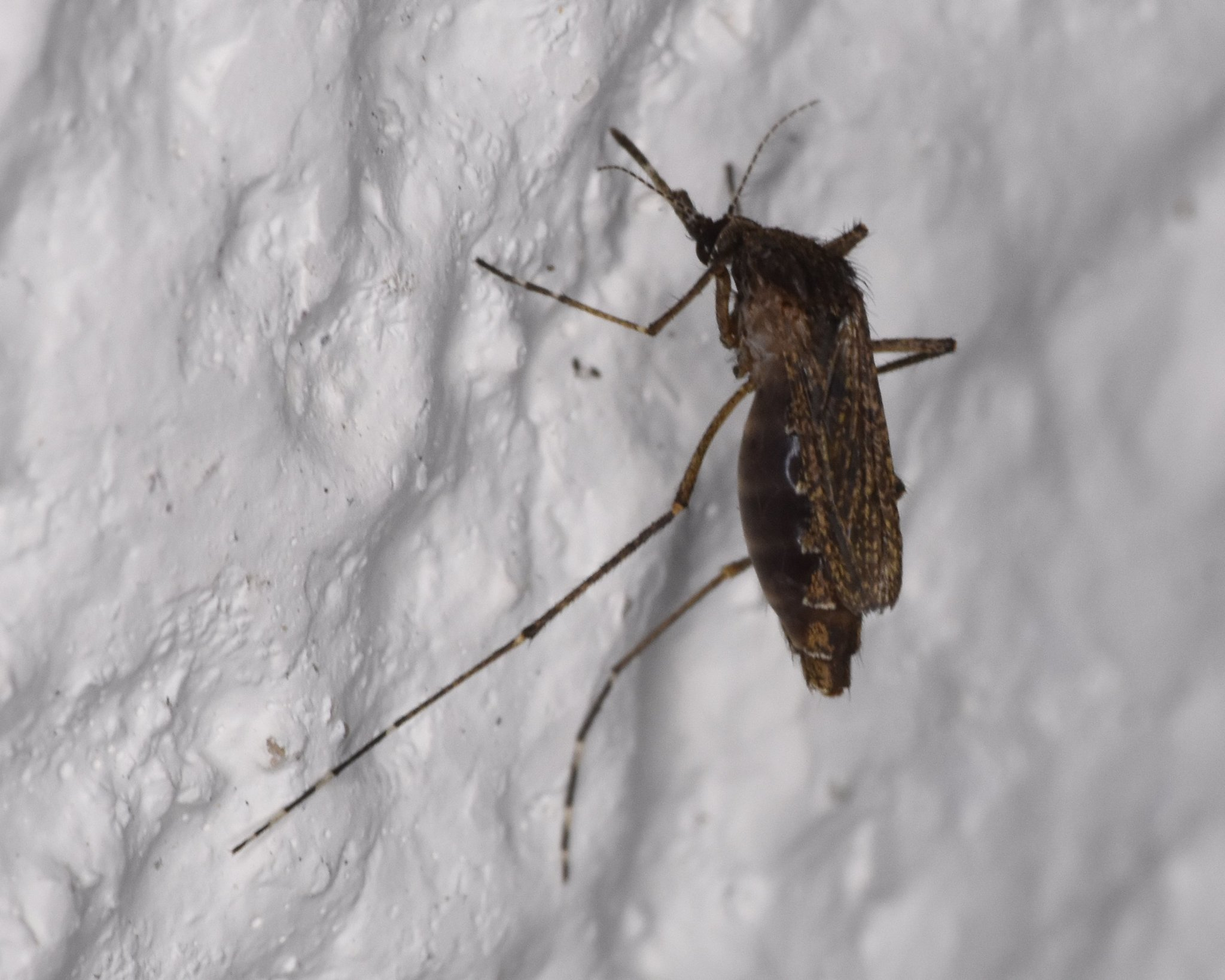
- female M. dyari from Florida

Scientific classification
- Kingdom: Animalia
- Phylum: Arthropoda
- Class: Insecta
- Order: Diptera
- Family: Culicidae
- Subfamily: Culicinae
- Tribe: Mansoniini
- Genus: Mansonia; Blanchard, 1901

Type species
- Mansonia titillans (Walker, 1848)

Subgenera
- Mansonia; Mansonioides

= Mansonia (fly) =

Genus of mosquitoes

Mansonia mosquitoes are large black or brown mosquitoes with sparkling on their wings and legs. They breed in ponds and lakes containing certain aquatic plants, especially the floating type like Pistia stratiotes and water hyacinth. The eggs are laid in star-shaped clusters on the undersurface of leaves of these plants. The larvae and pupae are found attached to the rootlets of these plants by their siphons. They obtain their air supply from these rootlets. When preparing to transform into adults, these pupae come to the surface of water and the fully formed adults emerge and escape. The control of Mansonia mosquitoes accomplished by removal or destruction of the aquatic host plants by herbicides.

A study published in 2013 determined that the species Mansonia dyari Belkin, Heinemann, and Page should be considered a potential vector of Rift Valley fever virus and would need to be controlled if the virus were introduced into an area where it occurs.

== Species ==
These 27 species belong to the genus Mansonia:

- Mansonia africana (Theobald, 1901)^{c g}
- Mansonia amazonensis (Theobald, 1901)^{c g}
- Mansonia annulata Leicester, 1908^{c g}
- Mansonia annulifera (Theobald, 1901)^{c g}
- Mansonia bonneae Edwards, 1930^{c g}
- Mansonia cerqueirai (Barreto & Coutinho, 1944)^{c g}
- Mansonia chagasi (Lima, 1935)^{c g}
- Mansonia dives (Schiner, 1868)
- Mansonia dyari Belkin, Heinemann & Page, 1970^{i c g b}
- Mansonia flaveola (Coquillett, 1906)^{c g}
- Mansonia fonsecai (Pinto, 1932)^{c g}
- Mansonia humeralis Dyar & Knab, 1916^{c g}
- Mansonia iguassuensis Barbosa, Silva & Sallum, 2007^{c g}
- Mansonia indiana Edwards, 1930^{c g}
- Mansonia indubitans Dyar & Shannon, 1925^{c g}
- Mansonia leberi Boreham, 1970^{c g}
- Mansonia melanesiensis Belkin, 1962^{c g}
- Mansonia nigerrima Theobald, 1910^{c g}
- Mansonia papuensis (Taylor, 1914)^{c}
- Mansonia perturbans Walker^{i g}
- Mansonia pessoai (Barreto & Coutinho, 1944)^{c g}
- Mansonia pseudotitillans (Theobald, 1901)^{c g}
- Mansonia septempunctata Theobald, 1905^{c g}
- Mansonia suarezi Cova Garcia & Sutil, 1976^{c g}
- Mansonia titillans (Walker, 1848)^{i c g b}
- Mansonia uniformis (Theobald, 1901)^{g}
- Mansonia wilsoni (Barreto & Coutinho, 1944)^{c g}

Data sources: i = ITIS, c = Catalogue of Life, g = GBIF, b = Bugguide.net
