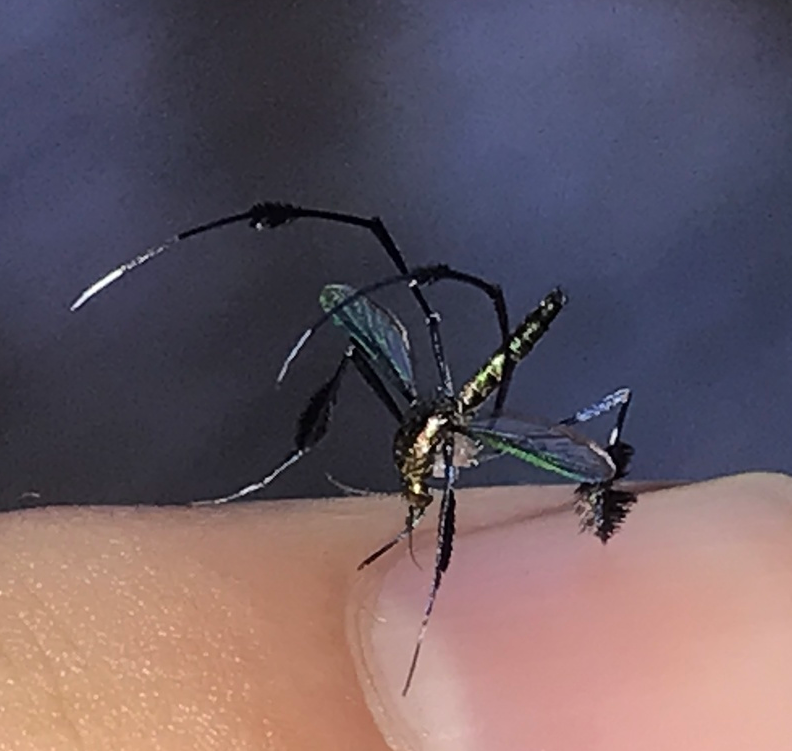

Scientific classification
- Kingdom: Animalia
- Phylum: Arthropoda
- Class: Insecta
- Order: Diptera
- Family: Culicidae
- Genus: Sabethes
- Species: S. tarsopus

Binomial name
- Sabethes tarsopus Dyar & Knab, 1908

= Sabethes tarsopus =

Neotropical mosquito species in the genus Sabethes

Sabethes (Sabethes) tarsopus is a species of mosquito in the family Culicidae, subfamily Culicinae, and is part of the Neotropical genus Sabethes. It was first described by Dyar and Knab in 1908.

== Taxonomy and identification ==
Sabethes tarsopus belongs to the subgenus Sabethes within the genus Sabethes. It was historically confused with the closely related species Sabethes gymnothorax until detailed morphological studies clarified their distinctions. Key distinguishing features of S. tarsopus include the scaling patterns on the legs and thorax, as well as unique characteristics in the larvae and pupae.

== Distribution and habitat ==
Sabethes tarsopus is found in Central and South America, with records from forested regions where it breeds in water-filled plant cavities, such as tree holes. Like other Sabethes species, it is considered primarily arboreal, often occurring in the forest canopy.

== Morphology ==
Adults of S. tarsopus are noted for their metallic coloration and elaborate leg ornamentation, typical of the genus. The forelegs and midlegs have distinctive paddle-like scales, and the species can be differentiated from similar taxa by the pattern and extent of white and metallic scaling on the legs and thorax.

== Molecular studies ==
Recent research has included S. tarsopus in mitochondrial genome sequencing and phylogenetic studies. The mitochondrial genome of S. tarsopus is approximately 14,920 base pairs, containing 37 functional genes (13 protein-coding genes, 22 tRNAs, and 2 rRNAs). Phylogenetic analyses confirm the monophyly of the Sabethes subgenera and support the current morphological taxonomy.
