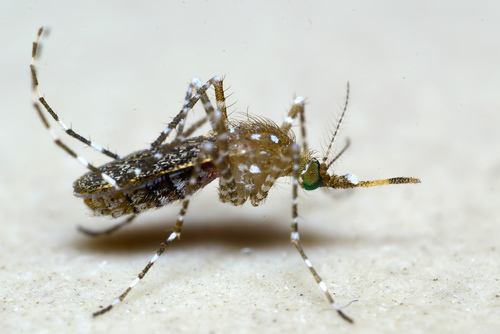

Scientific classification
- Kingdom: Animalia
- Phylum: Arthropoda
- Clade: Pancrustacea
- Class: Insecta
- Order: Diptera
- Family: Culicidae
- Genus: Mansonia
- Species: M. annulifera

Binomial name
- Mansonia annulifera (Theobald, 1901)

Synonyms
- Mansonioides septemguttata Theobald, 1907; Panoplites seguini Laveran, 1901

= Mansonia annulifera =

Species of mosquito

Mansonia (Mansonioides) annulifera is a species of zoophilic mosquito belonging to the genus Mansonia. It is a vector of humans filliarisis.

== Distribution ==
Mansonia annulifera has a wide range. It is found in Australia, Bangladesh, Cambodia, India, Indonesia, Laos, Malaysia, Myanmar, Nepal, New Guinea (Island); Papua New Guinea, Philippines, Sri Lanka, Thailand and Vietnam. A study conducted in Thailand found that M. annulifera populations increased during warmer and more humid weather, raising concern that climate change could lead to increased rates in mosquito-transmitted filiariasis.

== Behavior ==
Mansonia annulifera is an endophilic species, preferring to rest indoors. One study conducted in India found that adults are normally active between midnight and dawn. A more recent study conducted in Indonesia found that mosquitos took blood meals at all times of day but most often fed from humans around sunset.

== Medical importance ==
Mansonia annulifera demonstrates a high affinity for biting humans and is a potent vector of Brugia malayi and Wucheria bancrofti, both causative agents of filariasis In 1980, The Japanese encephalitis virus was isolated from M. annulifera in India.
