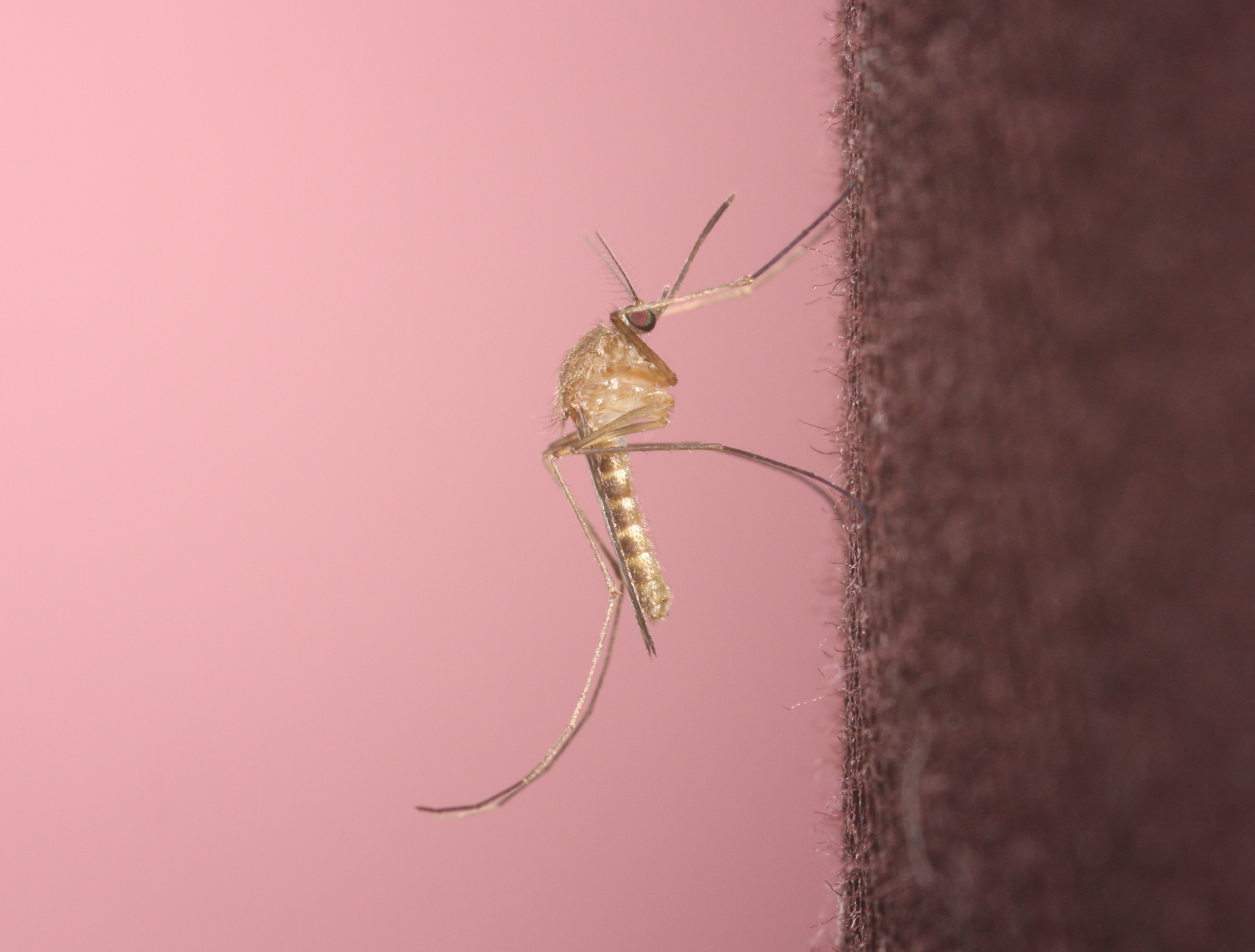
- Culex pipiens

Scientific classification
- Kingdom: Animalia
- Phylum: Arthropoda
- Clade: Pancrustacea
- Class: Insecta
- Order: Diptera
- Family: Culicidae
- Subfamily: Culicinae
- Tribe: Culicini; Meigen, 1818

Genera
- Culex (768 species); Deinocerites (18 species); Galindomyia (1 species); Lutzia (8 species); Neoculicites (3 species)

Audio
- Culex pipiens

= Culicini =

Tribe of flies

Culicini is a tribe of mosquitoes in the subfamily Culicinae.
