= Kimia (fly) =

Scientific classification
- Kingdom: Animalia
- Phylum: Arthropoda
- Clade: Pancrustacea
- Class: Insecta
- Order: Diptera
- Family: Culicidae
- Subfamily: Culicinae
- Tribe: Sabethini
- Genus: Kimi; Vu Duc Huong & Harbach, 2007

Genus of mosquitoes

Kimia is a genus of mosquitoes found in eastern Asia.

== Species ==
The genus includes the following species:

- Kimia decorabilis (Leicester, 1908)
- Kimia imitata (Baisas, 1946)
- Kimia miyagii (Toma & Mogi, 2003)
- Kimia nemorosa (Gong, 1996)
- Kimia suchariti (Miyagi & Toma, 1989)
