= Mansonia indiana =

Scientific classification
- Kingdom: Animalia
- Phylum: Arthropoda
- Class: Insecta
- Order: Diptera
- Family: Culicidae
- Genus: Mansonia
- Species: M. indiana

Binomial name
- Mansonia indiana Edwards, 1930

Species of mosquito

Mansonia indiana is a species of zoophilic mosquito belonging to the genus Mansonia. It is found in Sri Lanka, Java, India, Myanmar, Malaya, Singapore, Sumatra, Thailand, and New Guinea. It is a vector of nocturnally subperiodic Brugia malayi. Females are known to be strongly anthropophilic (human biters). Larvae found only in association with Pistia species.
