= Lutzia shinonagai =

Scientific classification
- Kingdom: Animalia
- Phylum: Arthropoda
- Class: Insecta
- Order: Diptera
- Family: Culicidae
- Genus: Lutzia
- Subgenus: Insulalutzia; Tanaka, 2003
- Species: L. shinonagai

Binomial name
- Lutzia shinonagai (Tanaka, Mizusawa and Saugstad, 1979)

Species of fly

Lutzia shinonagai was first described in 1979. The genus name was originally spelled Lützia; the species name honors medical entomologist Dr. Satoshi Shinonaga who has published extensively on the taxonomy of the muscid, sarcophagid and calliphorid flies of Japan and the Oriental Region. Lutzia shinonagai is the only species in the subgenus Insulalutzia.

== Bionomics ==
Collected on Chichijima, Lutzia shinonagai is one of four species of mosquitoes enzootic to the Ogasawara Islands of Japan. Larvae have been collected from a tree hole.
