= Mansonia dyari =

Scientific classification
- Kingdom: Animalia
- Phylum: Arthropoda
- Class: Insecta
- Order: Diptera
- Family: Culicidae
- Genus: Mansonia
- Species: M. dyari

Binomial name
- Mansonia dyari Belkin, Heinemann & Page, 1970

Species of fly

Mansonia dyari is a species of mosquito in the family Culicidae.
