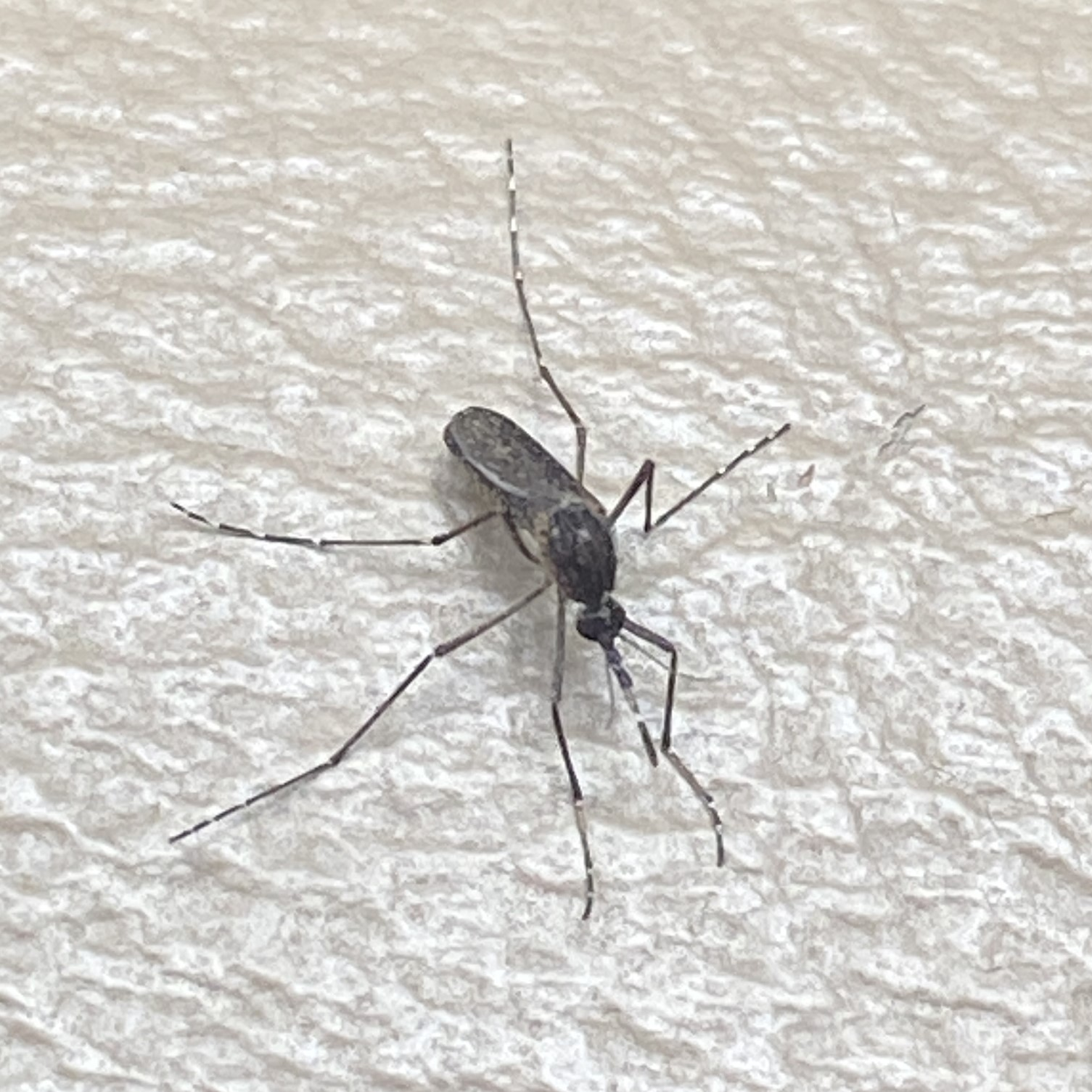

Scientific classification
- Kingdom: Animalia
- Phylum: Arthropoda
- Class: Insecta
- Order: Diptera
- Family: Culicidae
- Genus: Mansonia
- Species: M. titillans

Binomial name
- Mansonia titillans (Walker, 1848)

Synonyms
- Culex titillans Walker, 1848

= Mansonia titillans =

Species of fly

Mansonia titillans is a species of mosquito in the family Culicidae.
