= Deinocerites =

Scientific classification
- Kingdom: Animalia
- Phylum: Arthropoda
- Class: Insecta
- Order: Diptera
- Family: Culicidae
- Tribe: Culicini
- Genus: Deinocerites; Theobald, 1901

Genus of flies

Deinocerites is a genus of mosquitoes in the family Culicidae. There are about 18 described species in Deinocerites.

== Species ==
These 18 species belong to the genus Deinocerites:

- Deinocerites atlanticus Adames, 1971
- Deinocerites barretoi Adames, 1971
- Deinocerites belkini Adames, 1971
- Deinocerites cancer Theobald, 1901 (crabhole mosquito)
- Deinocerites colombianus Adames, 1971
- Deinocerites costaricensis Adames & Hogue, 1969
- Deinocerites curiche Adames, 1971
- Deinocerites dyari Belkin & Hogue, 1959
- Deinocerites epitedeus (Knab, 1907)
- Deinocerites howardi Belkin & Hogue, 1959
- Deinocerites magnus (Theobald, 1901)
- Deinocerites mathesoni Belkin & Hogue, 1959
- Deinocerites mcdonaldi Belkin & Hogue, 1959
- Deinocerites melanophylum Dyar & Knab, 1907
- Deinocerites nicoyae Adames & Hogue, 1969
- Deinocerites panamensis Adames, 1971
- Deinocerites pseudes Dyar & Knab, 1909
- Deinocerites spanius (Dyar & Knab, 1909)
