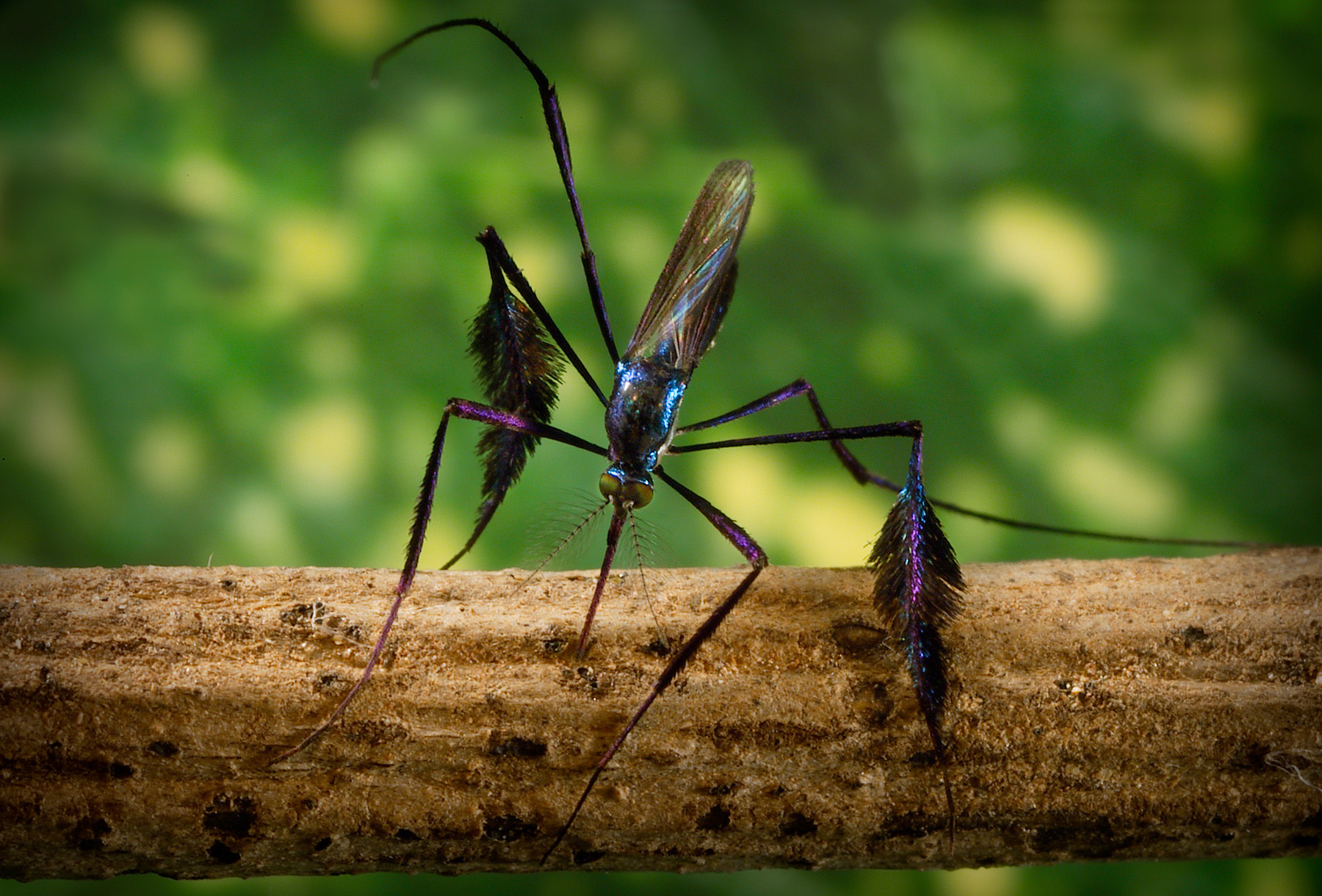

Scientific classification
- Kingdom: Animalia
- Phylum: Arthropoda
- Clade: Pancrustacea
- Class: Insecta
- Order: Diptera
- Family: Culicidae
- Genus: Sabethes
- Species: S. cyaneus

Binomial name
- Sabethes cyaneus (Fabricius, 1805)

= Sabethes cyaneus =

Species of mosquito

Sabethes (Sabethes) cyaneus is a species of mosquito native to Central America and South America. It is recognized for its striking iridescent blue scales and leg paddles, which are involved in courtship. The larvae are facultative predators, using their siphon to capture prey, often other mosquito larvae.

== Taxonomy ==
Sabethes cyaneus was first described by entomologist Johan Christian Fabricius in 1805. It belongs to the subgenus Sabethes within the genus Sabethes of the family Culicidae. A historical synonym for this species is Sabethes locuples (Robineau-Desvoidy, 1827).

== Description ==
As with many other Sabethini, adult Sabethes cyaneus are medium-sized mosquitoes with iridescent blue scales, which cover their bodies and legs, and ornamental 'paddles' on their midlegs formed from elongated scales.

== Distribution and habitat ==
Sabethes cyaneus is distributed across Central America and South America, ranging from Mexico to Argentina. It thrives in Neotropical forests, where it breeds in natural water containers such as tree holes and bamboo internodes. Adults are canopy dwellers and are rarely found at ground levels.

== Ecology and behavior ==
Sabethes cyaneus is a diurnal mosquito, active primarily during daylight hours. Females are hematophagous, feeding primarily on the blood of primates (occasionally including humans) to support egg development, while males feed exclusively on nectar and do not bite.

Uniquely among mosquitos, they exhibit elaborate mating behavior, with males waving their ornamented legs before and during copulation with the waiting females. The size of the paddles plays a role in mate choice, with females with smaller paddles being approached by fewer males. The males mate with multiple females but the females only mate with one male. However, they do not appear to choose males based on paddle size despite these displays. Courtship behaviours between males have also been observed.

Larvae develop in small, shaded water bodies and are facultative predators. While they can subsist on detritus and microorganisms, they will prey on larvae of other mosquito species when available. They use their elongated siphon to capture and hold their prey, as well as specialised maxillae which are also seen in other Sabethini larvae.

== Disease transmission ==
Sabethes cyaneus may be capable of acting as a vector for Zika virus, though not to the same degree as its primary vector, Aedes aegypti, and with a longer incubation period. No wild-caught specimens have been found to carry Zika virus.
