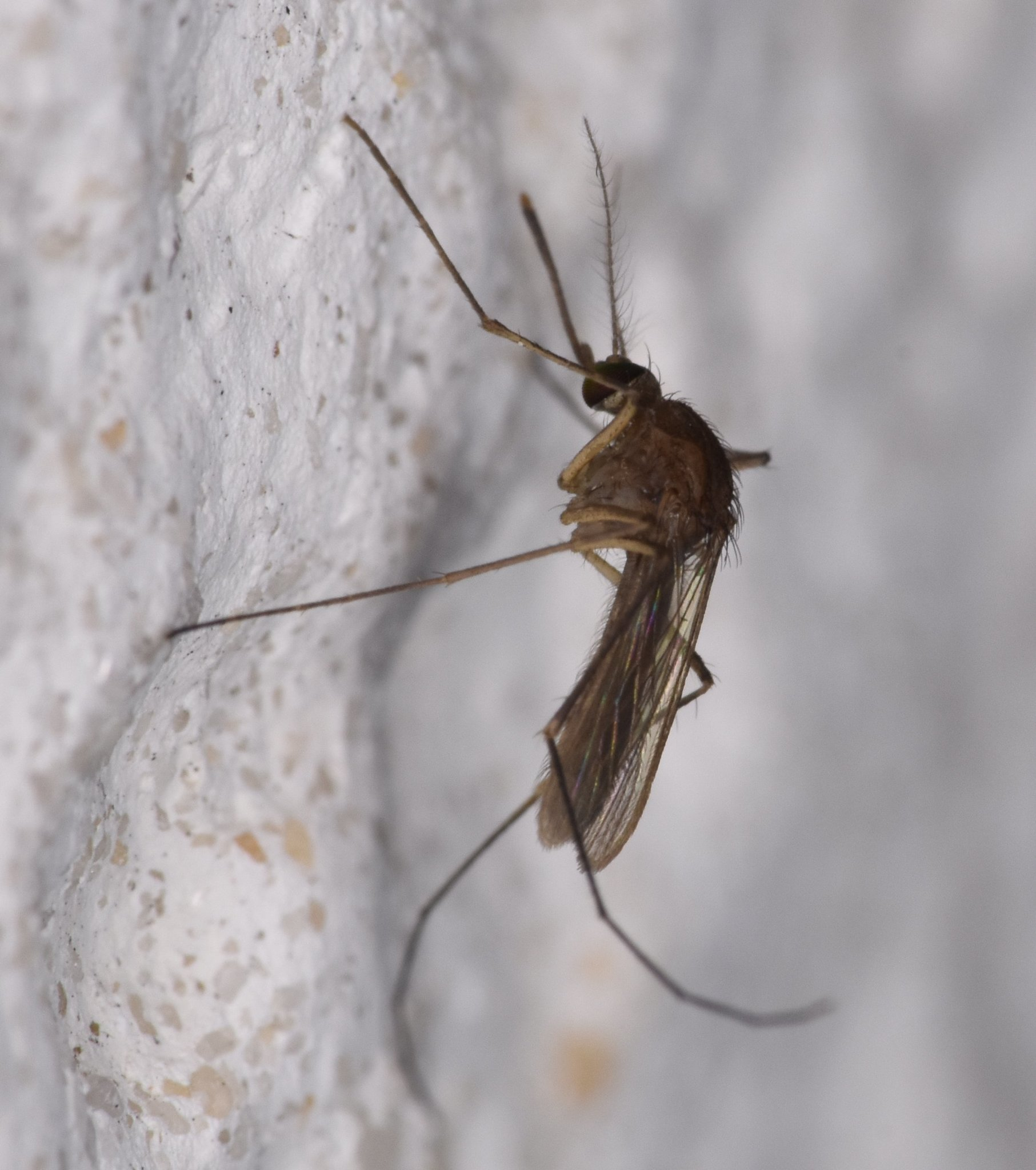
- D. cancer in Sarasota County, Florida

Scientific classification
- Kingdom: Animalia
- Phylum: Arthropoda
- Class: Insecta
- Order: Diptera
- Family: Culicidae
- Genus: Deinocerites
- Species: D. cancer

Binomial name
- Deinocerites cancer Theobald, 1901

= Deinocerites cancer =

Species of fly

Deinocerites cancer, the crabhole mosquito, is a species of mosquito in the family Culicidae. It was first described by the scientist Frederick Vincent Theobald in 1901.

== Feeding ==
The feeding pattern of the female D. cancer was observed to compromise about 75% avian hosts and 25% mammals. The avian hosts were almost all wading birds and the mammals tended to be rabbits.

== Habitat ==
These mosquitoes are often found amongst mangrove swamps and grassy salt marshes. They exhibit a unique form of species interaction, as they inhabit the holes created by land crabs. Females of the species lay their eggs into the water that accumulates in the lower portions of these craboles. Immature mosquitoes grow up in the accumulated water, and adults rest in the dry, upper portion of the crabholes during the day.

== Mating ==
Unlike most mosquitos, D. cancer has a pupal mating system where males copulate with female pupae prior to their full emergence or shortly afterwards. This behavior is similar to Opifex fuscus.

== Distribution ==
The geographic range of D. cancer includes Florida, the Bahamas, the Greater Antilles (excluding Puerto Rico), and certain coastal regions of Central America. In Florida, this species is most commonly found along Florida's east coast, and in some rare cases on the west coast.
