= Neoculicites =

Scientific classification
- Kingdom: Animalia
- Phylum: Arthropoda
- Class: Insecta
- Order: Diptera
- Family: Culicidae
- Subfamily: Culicinae
- Genus: †Neoculicites; Evenhuis, 1994

Type species
- Neoculicites depereti (Meunier, 1915)

Species
- Neoculicites arvernensis; Neoculicites ceyx; Neoculicites depereti

Extinct genus of mosquito

Neoculicites is a genus of extinct mosquitoes. The fossil specimens are N. arverensis and N. depereti from France, and N. ceyx from Germany, all of which are from the Oligocene. The quality of the specimens was extremely poor, being described as "worthless, barely preserved remnants which were recognised as mosquitoes".
