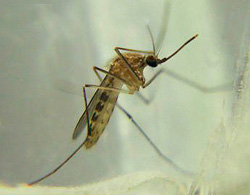
- Culex pipiens female
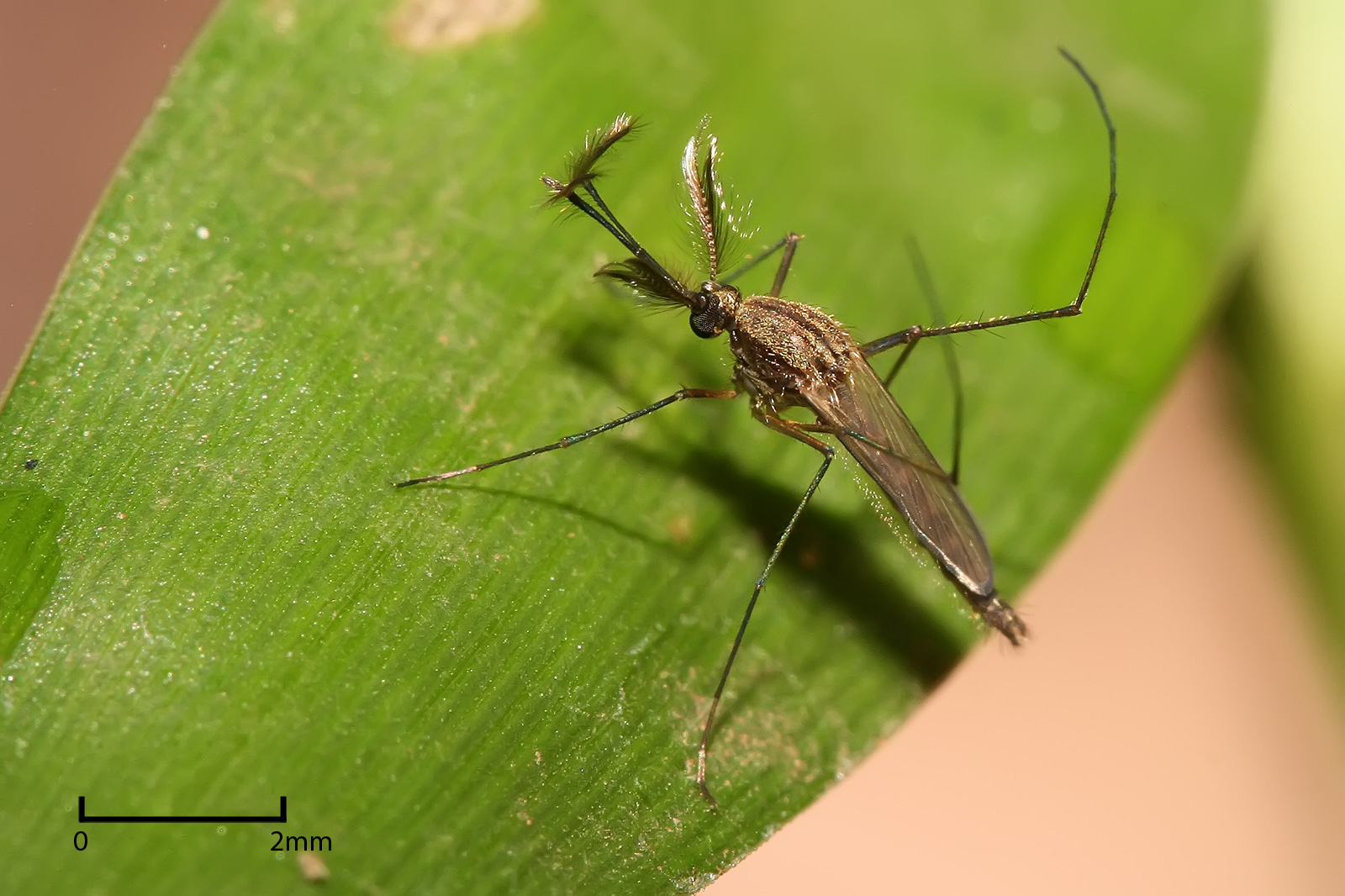
- Culex sp. male

Scientific classification
- Kingdom: Animalia
- Phylum: Arthropoda
- Clade: Pancrustacea
- Class: Insecta
- Order: Diptera
- Family: Culicidae
- Subfamily: Culicinae
- Tribe: Culicini
- Genus: Culex; Linnaeus, 1758

Type species
- Culex pipiens Linnaeus, 1758

Diversity
- Over 1,000 species

= Culex =

Genus of mosquitoes

Anatomy of a Culex larva

Anatomy of a Culex adult

Culex or typical mosquitoes are a genus of mosquitoes, several species of which serve as vectors of one or more important diseases of birds, humans, and other animals. The diseases they vector include arbovirus infections such as West Nile virus, Japanese encephalitis, or St. Louis encephalitis, but also filariasis and avian malaria. They occur worldwide except for the extreme northern parts of the temperate zone, and are the most common form of mosquito encountered in some major U.S. cities, such as Los Angeles.

== Etymology ==
In naming this genus, Carl Linnaeus used the nonspecific Latin term for a midge or gnat: culex.

== Description ==
Depending on the species, the adult Culex mosquito may measure from 4–10 mm (0.2–0.4 in). The adult morphology is typical of flies in the suborder Nematocera with the head, thorax, and abdomen clearly defined and the two forewings held horizontally over the abdomen when at rest. As in all Diptera capable of flight, the second pair of wings is reduced and modified into tiny, inconspicuous halteres.

Formal identification is important in mosquito control, but it is demanding and requires careful measurements of bodily proportions and noting the presence or absence of various bristles or other bodily features.

In the field, informal identification is more often important, and the first question as a rule is whether the mosquito is anopheline or culicine. Given a specimen in good condition, one of the first things to notice is the length of the maxillary palps. Especially in the female, palps as long as the proboscis are characteristic of anopheline mosquitoes. Culicine females have short palps. Anopheline mosquitoes tend to have dappled or spotted wings, while culicine wings tend to be clear. Anopheline mosquitoes tend to sit with their heads low and their rear ends raised high, especially when feeding, while culicine females keep their bodies horizontal. Anopheline larvae tend to float horizontal at the surface of the water when not in motion, whereas culicine larvae float with head low and only the siphon at the tail held at the surface.

== Life cycle ==
The developmental cycle of most species takes about two weeks in warm weather. The metamorphosis is typical of holometabolism in an insect: the female lays eggs in rafts of as many as 300 on the water's surface. Suitable habitats for egg-laying are small bodies of standing fresh water: puddles, pools, ditches, tin cans, buckets, bottles, unmounted tires, and water storage tanks (tree boles are suitable for only a few species). The tiny, cigar-shaped, dark brown eggs adhere to each other through adhesion forces, not any kind of cement, and are easily separated. Eggs hatch only in the presence of water, and the larvae are obligately aquatic, linear in form, and maintain their position and mostly vertical attitude in water by movements of their bristly mouthparts. To swim, they lash their bodies back and forth through the water.

During the larval stage, the insect lives submerged in water and feeds on particles of organic matter, microscopic organisms or plant material; after several instars it then develops into a pupa. Unlike the larva, the pupa is comma-shaped. It does not feed, but can swim in rapid jerking motions to avoid potential predators. It must remain in regular contact with the surface to breathe, but it must not become desiccated. After 24–48 hours, the pupa ruptures and the adult emerges from the shed exoskeleton.

== Vector of disease ==
Diseases borne by one or more species of Culex mosquitoes vary in their dependence on the species of vector. Some are rarely and only incidentally transmitted by Culex species, but Culex and closely related genera of culicine mosquitoes readily support perennial epidemics of certain major diseases if they become established in a particular region.

- Cat Que Virus (CQV) has been largely reported in Culex mosquitoes in China and in pigs in Vietnam. For CQV, domestic pigs are considered to be the primary mammalian hosts. Antibodies against the virus have been reported in swine reared locally in China.
- Arbovirus infections transmitted by various species of Culex include West Nile virus, Japanese encephalitis, St. Louis encephalitis, and Western and Eastern equine encephalitis. Brazilian scientists are investigating if Culex species transmit zika virus.
- Nematode infections, mainly forms of filariasis may be borne by Culex species, as well as by other mosquitoes and bloodsucking flies.
- Protist parasites in the phylum Apicomplexa, such as various forms of avian malaria

Nonanal has been identified as a compound that attracts Culex mosquitoes, perhaps pheromonally. Nonanal acts synergistically with carbon dioxide.

== Diversity ==
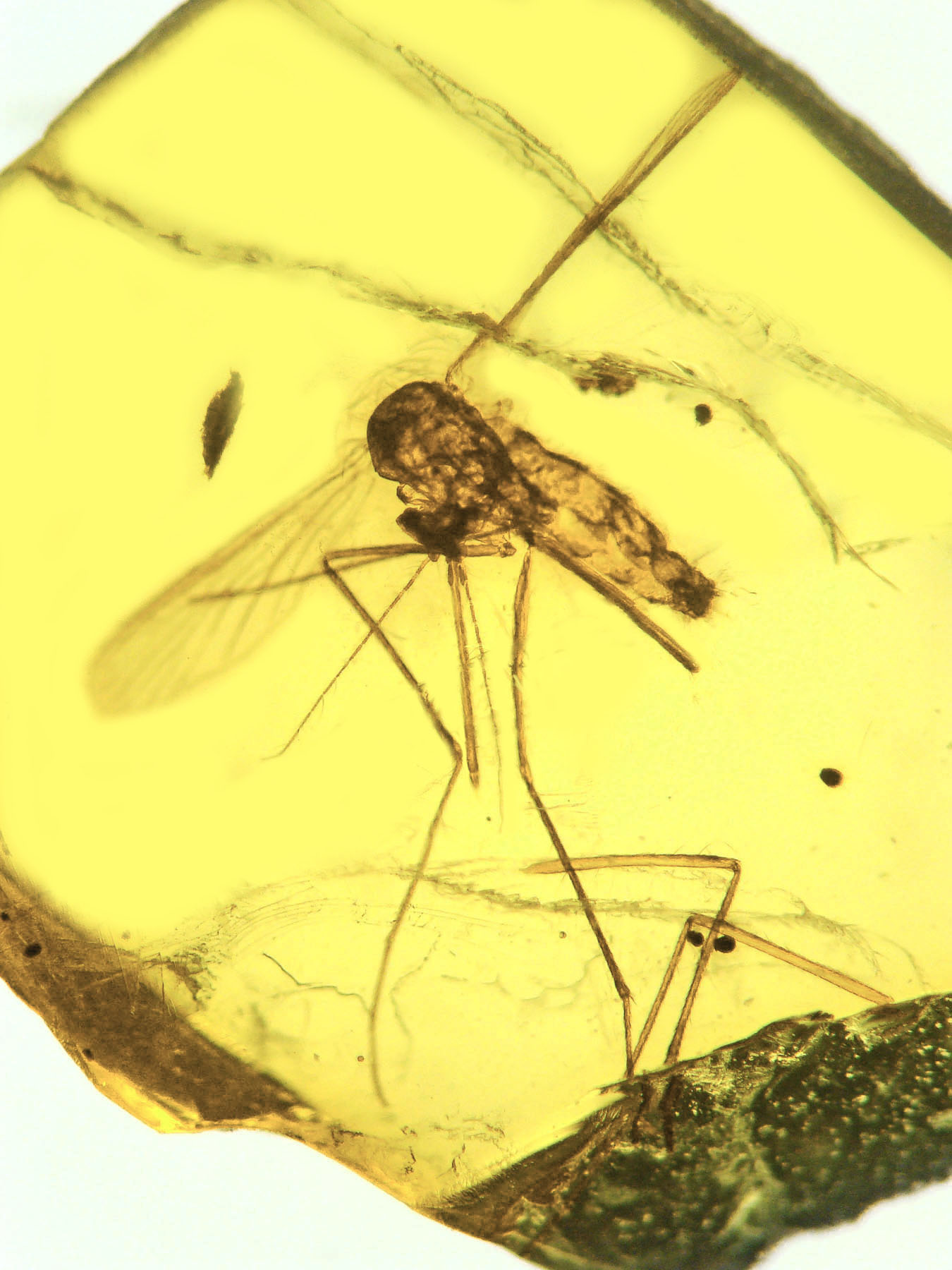
Culex malariager, infected with the malarial parasite Plasmodium dominicana, in 15–20 million year old Dominican amber

Culex is a diverse genus. It comprises over 20 subgenera that include a total of well over 1,000 species. Publications of newly described species are frequent.
