= Frederick Vincent Theobald =

English entomologist (1868–1930)

Frederick Vincent Theobald FES
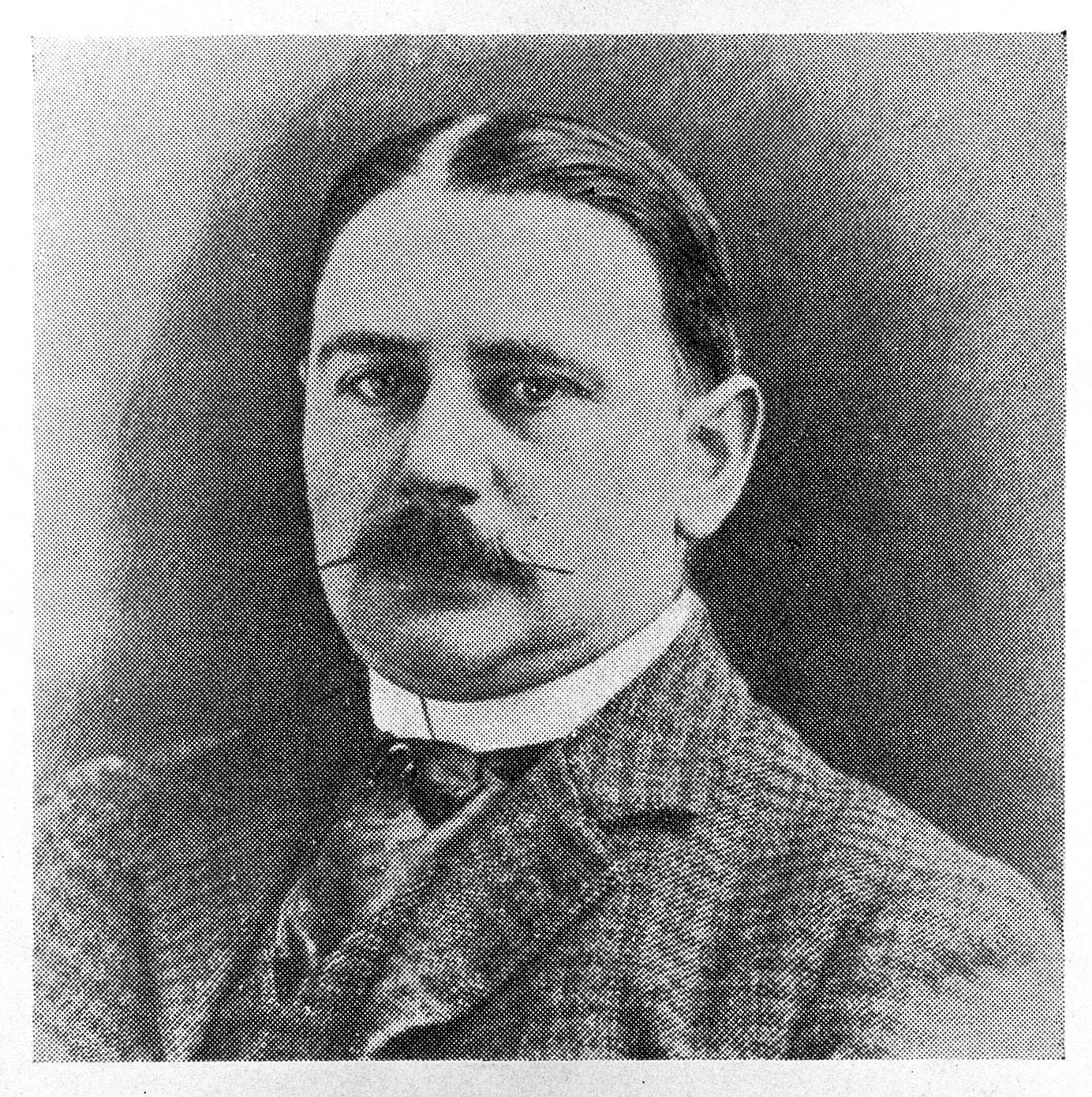
- Born: 15 May 1868; Tooting, Surrey
- Died: 6 March 1930 (aged 61); Wye, Kent
- Education: St John's College, Cambridge
- Known for: • A Monograph of the Culicidae, or Mosquitoes (five vols, 1901–1910) • The Insect and Other Allied Pests of Orchard, Bush and Hothouse Fruits and their Prevention and Treatment (1909) • A Text-book of Agricultural Zoology (1913) • The Plant Lice or Aphididae of Great Britain (three vols, 1926–1929)
- Awards: Imperial Ottoman Order of Osmanieh, Mary Kingsley Medal, Victoria Medal of Honour, Grande Médaille Isidore Geoffroy Saint-Hilaire
- Scientific career
- Fields: Entomology, tropical medicine, and sanitation

Frederick Vincent Theobald FES (15 May 1868 – 6 March 1930) was an English entomologist and "distinguished authority on mosquitoes". During his career, he was responsible for the economic zoology section of the Natural History Museum, London, vice-principal of the South-Eastern Agricultural College at Wye, Kent, Professor of Agricultural Zoology at London University, and advisory entomologist to the Board of Agriculture for the South-Eastern district of England. He wrote a five volume monograph and sixty scientific papers on mosquitoes. He was recognised for his work in entomology, tropical medicine, and sanitation; awards for his work include the Imperial Ottoman Order of Osmanieh, the Mary Kingsley Medal, and the Victoria Medal of Honour, as well as honorary fellowships of learned societies.

== Life and career ==
Frederick Vincent Theobald was born on 15 May 1868 in Tooting (then in Surrey), the son of solicitor John P. Theobald and Anne Theobald (née Matthews). From childhood he showed a great interest in nature, particularly insects. Aged eight, "with childish enthusiasm, he set himself the task of writing the 'Fauna of Sussex'" and produced a set of pages his parents deemed worthy of binding.

After graduating from St John's College, Cambridge, he was a University Extension Lecturer in economic zoology (Note: So cited obituaries and biographies, but the title page of Theobald (1892) gives "Cambridge University Extension Lecturer in injurious insects".) for three years before joining the South-Eastern Agricultural College at Wye, Kent, in 1894, where he was lecturer in economic entomology and zoology, and vice-principal "for several years". (Note: Title pages of Theobald's books show him as vice-principal in 1904, 1905, 1906, 1908, 1913, and 1920.)

Between 1899 and 1910, Theobald worked with the British Museum on mosquito taxonomy and led the economic zoology section of the British Museum from 1900 to 1904. He was also Professor of Agricultural Zoology at London University. (Note: Sources listed do not indicate when Theobald commenced at London University. He is addressed as Professor when (re-)elected FES in 1910 but his affiliation is shown as "Agricultural College, Wye". However, lists of fellows from 1911 show him as "Prof." and only give "Wye Court, Wye". Title pages of his books show him as Professor at London University in 1913 and 1920 (as well as vice-principal of Wye College). Cited obituaries and biographies disagree on the details.) Theobald lectured at the college at Wye until 1920 when he became advisory entomologist to the Board of Agriculture for the South-Eastern district of England.

Theobald died on 6 March 1930 in Wye, Kent, and was buried in Wye Churchyard.

== Natural history ==
After the discovery at the end of the 19th century that malaria was transmitted by mosquitoes, the British Museum promoted mosquito taxonomy as a necessary step in the control of mosquitoes. With this support, Theobald wrote A Monograph of the Culicidae, or Mosquitoes (in five volumes, 1901–1910) for the Colonial Office and the Royal Society. He also wrote sixty scientific papers on mosquitoes and was the first to describe numerous species of insects. In addition, his research contributed to the fields of tropical medicine and sanitation.

Theobold bequeathed his Aphididae collection and types to the British Museum. The journal Nature notes that he had formed "probably the finest collection in existence of insects of economic importance, showing the various stages and damage done by these pests".

Examples of mosquitoes first described scientifically by Theobald (from Diptera. Fam. Culicidae, 1905)

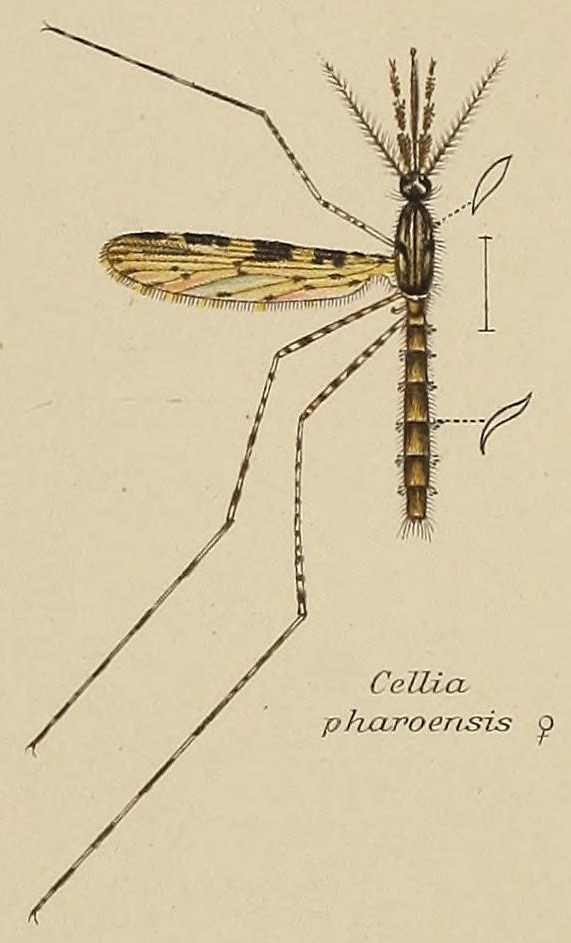
Cellia pharoensis

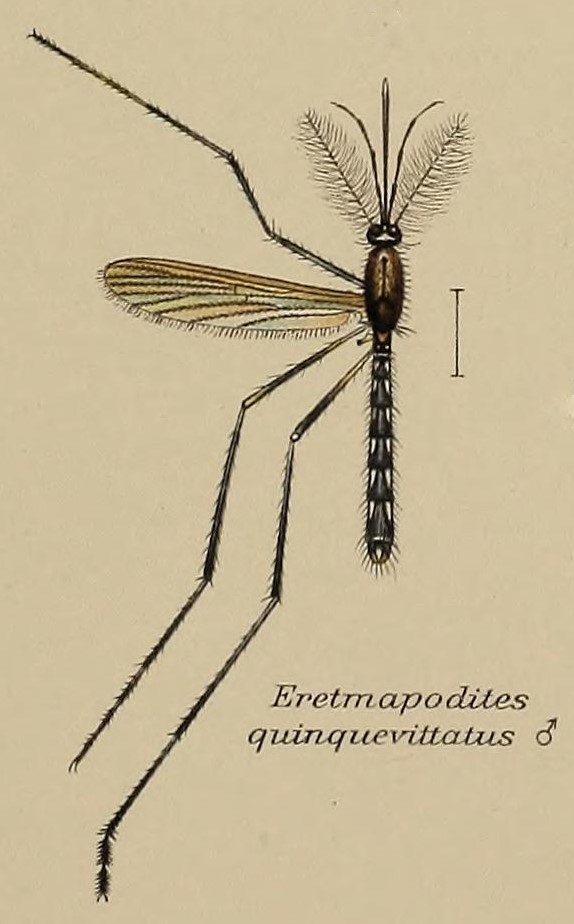
Eretmapodites quinquevittatus

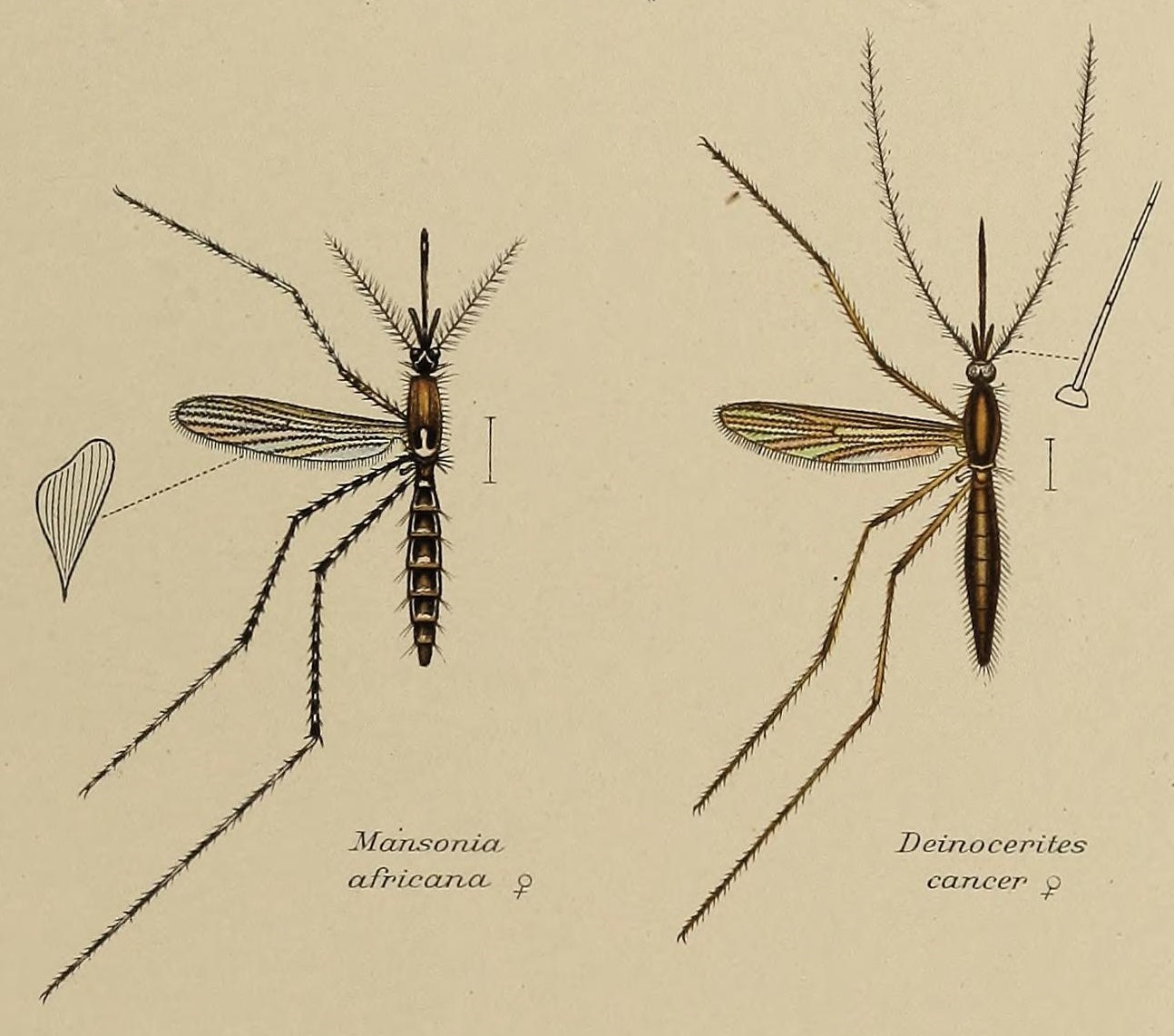
Mansonia africana, Deinocerites cancer

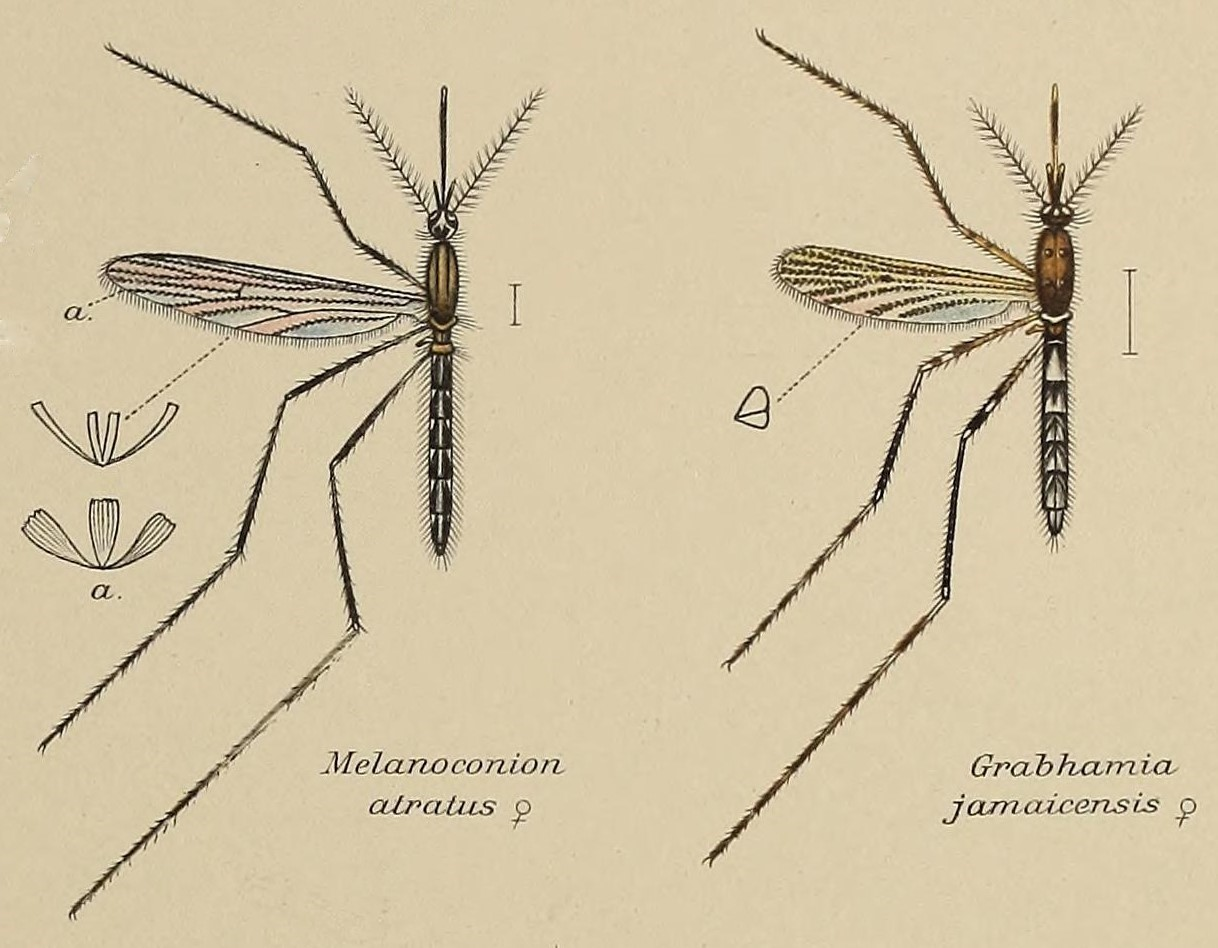
Melanoconion atratus, Grabhamia jamaicensis

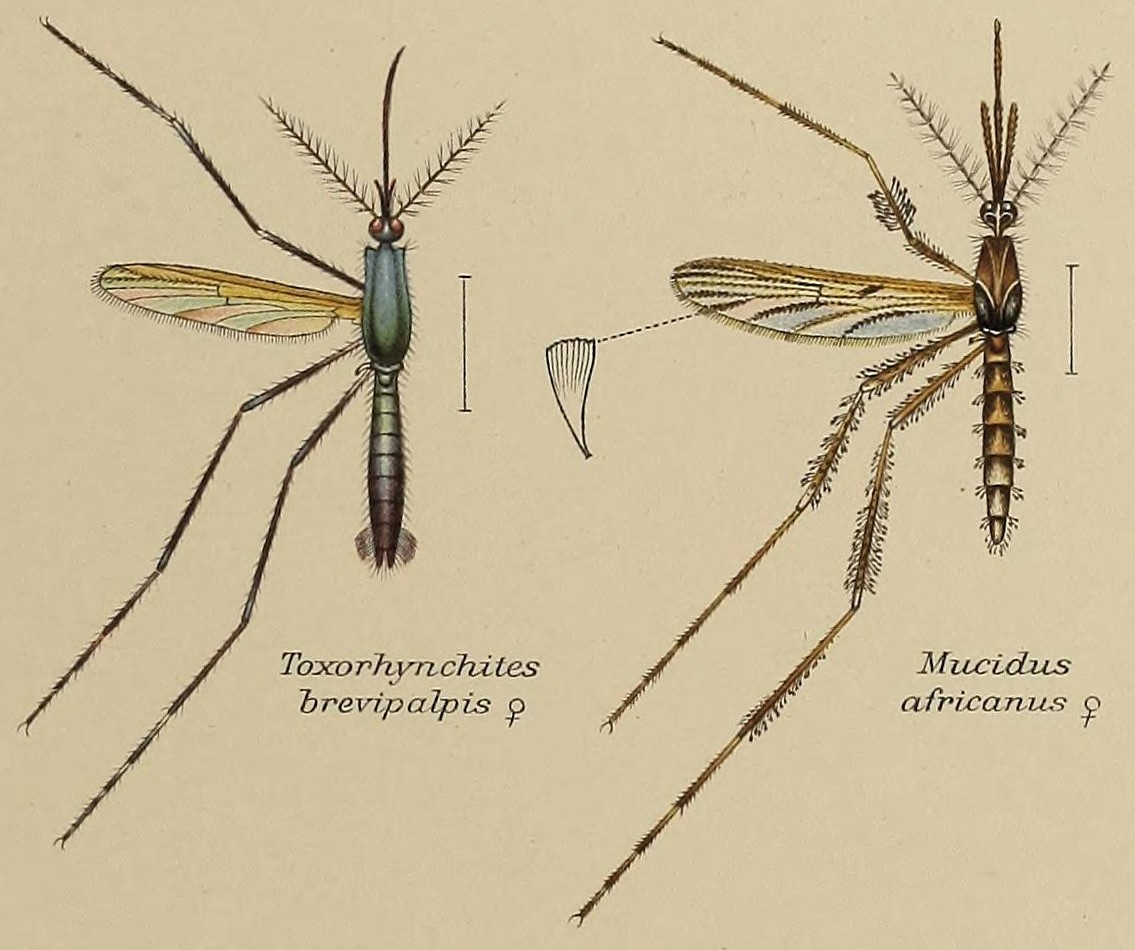
Toxorhynchites brevipalpis, Mucidus africanus

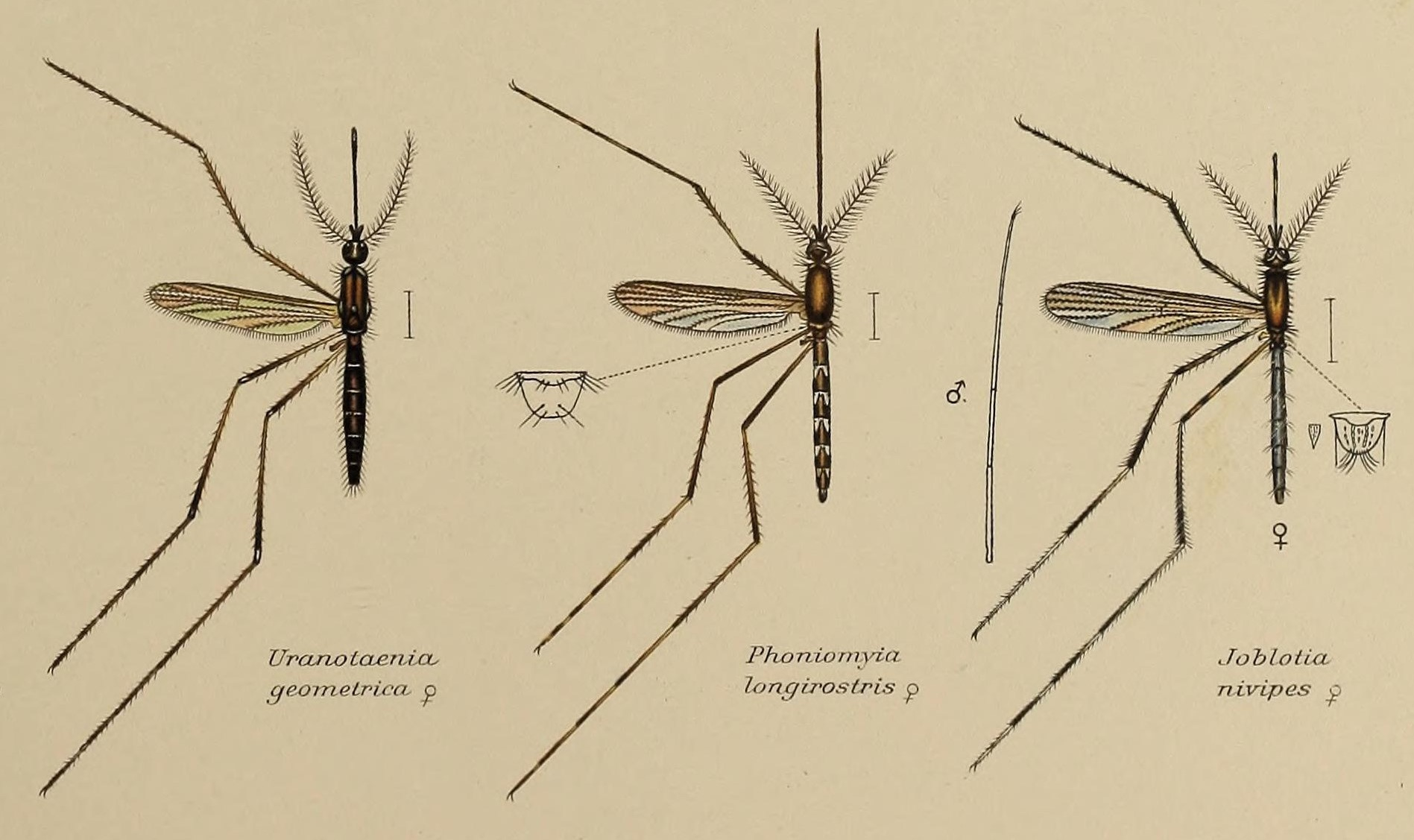
Uranotaenia geometrica, Phoniomyia longirostris, Joblotia nivipes

== Societies and honours ==
Theobald's obituary in The Times notes that "he was the member of many learned societies, foreign as well as English". He was a fellow of the Royal Entomological Society from 1886 to 1901, and again from 1910, (Note: Theobald is not included in the 1902 list of fellows of the Entomological Society.) council member and fellow of the Society of Tropical Medicine and Hygiene from 1907, and an "early president" of the Society of Economic Biologists. (Note: Title pages of Theobald's books show him as president in 1905, 1906, and 1908.) He was awarded honorary membership of:

Few people had played such a leading part as Mr. Theobald in the modern development of tropical medicine and sanitation.

— Letter from Nobel laureate Sir Ronald Ross, read at the Mary Kingsley Medal presentation ceremony, Liverpool School of Tropical Medicine, 14 November 1913.
- Société Nationale d'Acclimatation de France, from which he received the Grande Médaille Isidore Geoffroy Saint-Hilaire,
- Société pour l'Étude Agriculturale Zoologique de Bordeaux,
- Société de Médecine Tropicale de Paris,
- Société de Pathologie Exotique, Paris,
- Association of Economic Entomologists of the United States, and
- Royal Horticultural Society, from which he received the Victoria Medal of Honour in 1926.

Theobald was made an Officer of the Imperial Ottoman Order of Osmanieh by the Egyptian Government in 1907 and was awarded the Mary Kingsley Medal by the Liverpool School of Tropical Medicine in 1913.

== Works ==
- Braun, M. G. C. C., P. Falcke, L. Sambon and F. V. Theobald (1908). The Animal Parasites of Man; A Handbook for Students and Medical Men. New York. Wood.
- Fantham, H. B., J. W. W. Stephens and F. V. Theobald (1920). The Animal Parasites of Man. New York. W. Wood.
- Massee, G. and F. V. Theobald (1908). The Enemies of the Rose. England. The Society.
- Pickering, S. U. and F. V. Theobald (1908). Fruit Trees and their Natural Enemies: with a Spraying Calendar. London. Simpkin, Marshall, Hamilton, Kent.
- Theobald, F. V. (1892). An Account of British Flies (Diptera). London. E. Stock.
- Theobald, F. V. (1896). The Parasitic Diseases of Poultry. London. Gurney.
- Theobald, F. V. (1900). Report of the Proceedings of the Expedition for the Study of the Causes of Malaria: Despatched to Sierra Leone, West Africa, under the leadership of Major Ronald Ross (Late Indian Medical Service), by the Liverpool School of Tropical Diseases, 29 July 1899. London. HM Stationery Office.
- Theobald, F. V. (1901,1903,1907,1910). A Monograph of the Culicidae, or Mosquitoes. Mainly compiled from the collections received at the British Museum from various parts of the world in connection with the investigation into the cause of malaria conducted by the Colonial office and the Royal Society. Vol. 1–5, Plates. London. Printed by order of the Trustees.
- Theobald, F. V. (1903). "Note on the Genus "Stegomyia" (Theobald), and its Distribution." In, Manson, P. The Relation of the Panama Canal to the Introduction of Yellow Fever into Asia: A paper read before the Epidemiological Society of London. London. Bedford Press. pp. 34–40.
- Theobald, F. V. (1903). "Report on a Collection of Mosquitoes or Culicidae, etc, From Gambia, and Descriptions of New Species." In, Dutton, J. E. Report of the Malaria Expedition to the Gambia 1902, of the Liverpool School of Tropical Medicine and Medical Parasitology. London. Longmans, Green for the University Press of Liverpool. pp. i–xi.
- Theobald, F. V. (1903). First Report on Economic Zoology. London. British Museum (Natural History).
- Theobald, F. V. (1903). "Two New Australian Culicids." The Entomologist. 36: 154–157.
- Theobald, F. V. (1903). "Two New Jamaican Culicidae." The Entomologist. 36: 281–283.
- Theobald, F. V. (1904). "The Mosquitoes of Egypt, the Sudan and Abyssinia." Report of the Wellcome Tropical Research Laboratories at the Gordon Memorial College, Khartoum. 1: 62–83.
- Theobald, F. V. (1904). "New Culicidae from the Federated Malay States." The Entomologist. 37: 12–15, 36–39, 77–78, 111–113, 163–165, 211–213, 236–239.
- Theobald, F. V. (1904). Second Report on Economic Zoology. London. British Museum (Natural History).
- Theobald, F. V. (1905). "Diptera. Fam. Culicidae." Genera Insectorum. 26: 1–50.
- Theobald, F. V. (1905). The Mosquitoes or Culicidae of Jamaica. Kingston, Institute of Jamaica.
- Theobald, F. V. (1905). "New Culicidae from the West Coast of Africa." The Entomologist. 38: 154–158.
- Theobald, F. V. (1905). "A New Ficalbia from West Africa." The Annals and Magazine of Natural History; Zoology, Botany, and Geology. 15: 199–200.
- Theobald, F. V. (1905). "A New Genus of Culicidae." The Entomologist. 38: 52–56.
- Theobald, F. V. (1905). "Some New Mosquitoes from Ceylon." The Journal of the Bombay Natural History Society. 16: 237–250.
- Theobald, F. V. (1906). Some Notable Instances of the Distribution of Injurious Insects by Artificial Means. London.
- Theobald, F. V. (1908). "First Report on the Collection of Culicidae and Corethridae in the Indian Museum, Calcutta, with Descriptions of New Genera and Species." Records of the Indian Museum. 2: 287–302.
- Theobald, F. V. (1908). "Notes on Some Transvaal Mosquitoes, Including Two New Species and a New Variety." The Entomologist. 41: 106–109.
- Theobald, F. V. (1909). The Insect and Other Allied Pests of Orchard, Bush and Hothouse Fruits and their Prevention and Treatment. Wye, England. Published by the author.
- Theobald, F. V. (1910). "The Culicidae of Fiji, Including Two New Species." The Entomologist. 43: 155–159.
- Theobald, F. V. (1910). "Five New Culiciae from Ashanti." The Annals and Magazine of Natural History; Zoology, Botany, and Geology. 5: 373–378.
- Theobald, F. V. (1910). "Second Report on the Collection of Culicidae in the Indian Museum, Calcutta, with Descriptions of New Genera and Species." Records of the Indian Museum. 4: 1–33.
- Theobald, F. V. (1911). "Culicidae of the R. Zool. Soc. 'Natura Artis Magistra', Amsterdam and description of three new species." Tijdschrift voor Entomologie. 54: 233–240.
- Theobald, F. V. (1911). "A New African Corethra." The Annals and Magazine of Natural History; Zoology, Botany, and Geology. 7: 399–400.
- Theobald, F.V. (1911). "The Culicidae of the Transvaal." First Report of the Director of Veterinary Research. Pretoria, South Africa: Government Printer and Stationery Office. pp. 232–272.
- Theobald, F.V. (1912). "Second Report on the Mosquitoes of the Transvaal." Second Report of the Director of Veterinary Research. Cape Town: Cape Times Limited, Government Printers. pp. 315–342.
- Theobald, F. V. (1912). "Three New Culicidae from the Transvaal." The Entomologist. 45: 92–93.
- Theobald, F. V. (1913). "Culicidae from New Caledonia and the Loyalty Islands." Nova Caledonia. Forschungen in Neu–Caledonien und auf den Loyalty–Inseln. Recherches Scientifiques en Nouvelle–Calédonie et aux iles Loyalty. A. Zoologie. 1: 163–164.
- Theobald, F. V. (1913). "First List of Aphides Found with Myrmica." The Entomologist's Record and Journal of Variation. 25: 48–50.
- Theobald, F. V. (1913). "A New Mosquito from Northern China." The Entomologist. 46: 179–180.
- Theobald, F. V. (1913)[1899]. A Text-book of Agricultural Zoology. Revised, 2nd ed. Edinburgh. W. Blackwood and Sons.
- Theobald, F. V. (1914). "African Aphididae." Bulletin of Entomological Research. 4: 313–337.
- Theobald, F. V. (1914). "A New Mosquito from Samoa." The Entomologist. 47: 36–37.
- Theobald, F. V. (1915). "New Myrmecophilous Aphides." The Entomologist's Record and Journal of Variation. 27: 52–55.
- Theobald, F. V. (1916). "A New Myrmecophilous Aphid from Africa." The Entomologist's Record and Journal of Variation. 28: 37–37.
- Theobald, F. V. and W. McGowan (1916). "Report on the Food Found in the Rook, Starling and Chaffinch." Supplement to the Journal of the Board of Agriculture (Reports on the Food of the Rook, Starling and Chaffinch). 15: 7–49.
- Theobald, F. V. (1923). "New Aphididae Found in Egypt." Bulletin de la Société entomologique d'Égypte. 7: 39–80.
- Theobald, F. V. (1926–1929). The Plant Lice or Aphididae of Great Britain. Vol. 1–3.
- Theobald, F. V. (1927). "Two New Aphides from Ants' Nests." The Entomologist's Record and Journal of Variation. 39: 17–18.
