= 407 (disambiguation) =

407 may refer to:

- 407 (number)
- 407 AD, a year
- 407 BC, a year
- Area code 407

== Literacy ==
- Minuscule 407, a Greek manuscript

== Military ==
- 407 Long Range Patrol Squadron
- 407th Support Brigade

== Science and technology ==
- 407 Arachne, a large asteroid
- HTTP 407
- IBM 407, a tabulating machine
- NGC 407, a lenticular galaxy
- Poloxamer 407

== Transportation ==
=== Automobiles ===
- Bristol 407, a British sports tourer
- Moskvitch 407, a Russian compact estate/van
- Peugeot 407, a French mid-size car lineup
- Tata 407, an Indian pickup truck
- Weiwang 407, a Chinese electric cargo van

=== Helicopters ===
- Bell 407, a civil utility helicopter

=== Roads and routes ===
- List of highways numbered 407
- 407 Transitway, a planned bus route along Ontario 407
- Emirates Flight 407, a planned flight from Melbourne to Dubai

== See also ==
- 407th (disambiguation)
