= Mosquito proboscis inspired needles =

Female mosquitoes draw blood from a host using their proboscis, containing a bundle of microneedles, to aid egg production. The proboscis anatomy includes a series of stylets used to anchor the mosquito, puncture the surface, inject anesthetic agents, and draw in fluid. Complex microneedle mechanics allow for the fascicle of stylets to achieve a high critical buckling force and low insertion force. These traits can be transferred to the field of biomimetics to inspire designs for painless microneedles inducing minimal damage.

== Proboscis anatomy ==
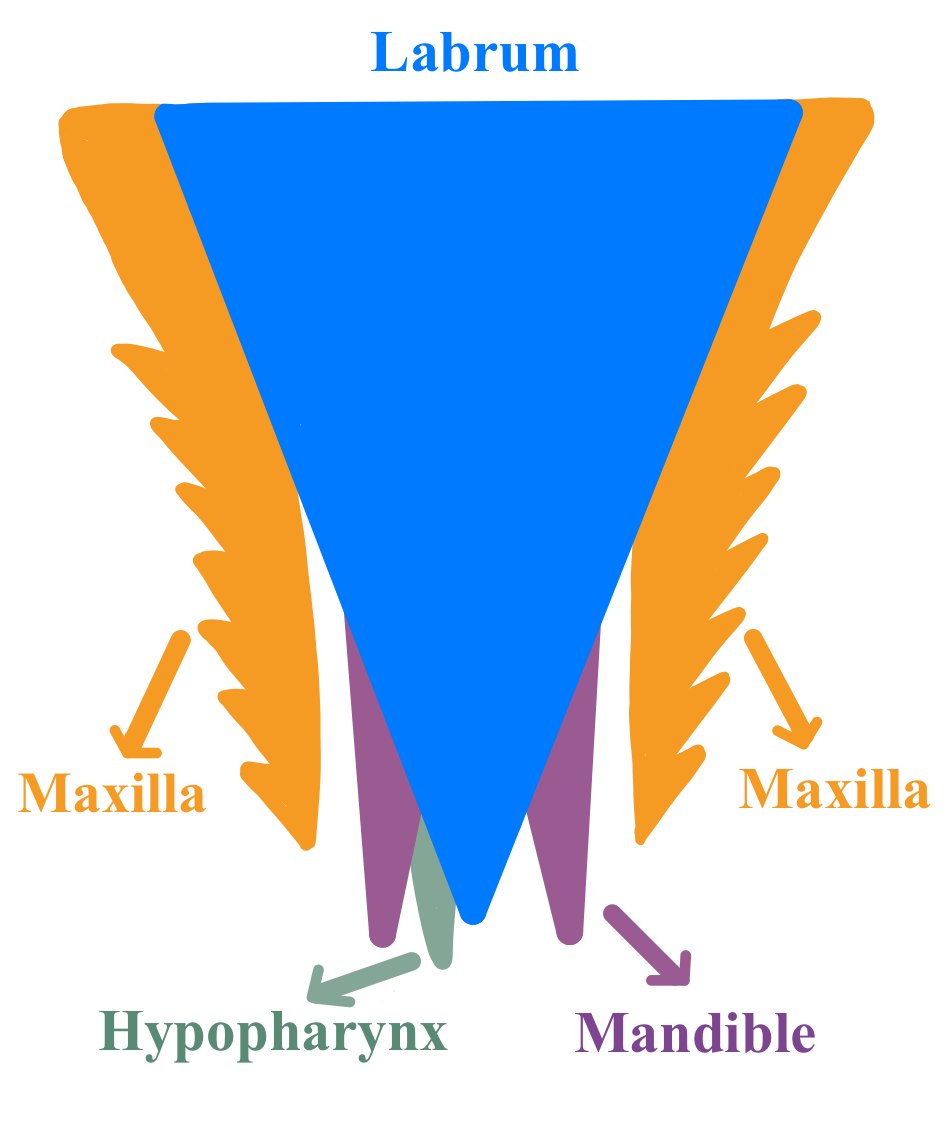
Mosquito Proboscis Anatomy - Profile View

The mosquito proboscis has six stylets inside a retractable cover called a labium. Within the labium, there is a fascicle comprising two maxillae, two mandibles, a labrum, and a hypopharynx. When the mosquito extends its proboscis into a host, the labium bends away from the stylet bundle. This provides support to the fascicle as it enters the tissue. The two maxillae are serrated, which decreases the friction on the tissue. Both the maxillae and the mandibles have sharp tips that pierce the skin. The hypopharynx secretes a numbing agent.

== Mosquito biting mechanisms ==
In addition to their plant and nectar-based diet, female mosquitoes use the proboscis to draw up blood from a host. Blood is required for energy and egg production in blood-sucking mosquito species. Within the proboscis used for piercing the skin and collecting blood, there are several anatomical components assisting with this function.

During the 'biting' process, the labium, creating the outside of the proboscis, retracts to reveal the inner fascicle of six stylets. The labium is first used to sense and detect the insertion surface, and correspondingly retracts to provide support and guidance for the fascicle. Within the fascicle, the two maxillae (serrated edges) and two mandibles (sharp) are used to grip the surface and anchor the mosquito for needle insertion. The labrum is the central component of the fascicle used to puncture the blood vessel and draw in the fluid. The entire insertion process is regulated by small vibrational motions to lower puncture forces. First, the left maxilla will insert deeper into the tissue. The maxilla will then retract as the mandibles and labrum insert deeper simultaneously. That process then repeats for the right maxilla. Upon the labrum insertion, the hypopharynx releases a local anesthetic from the salivary gland. Once the feeding is completed, the hypopharynx will release an anticoagulant to prevent blood clotting at the insertion site. The entire bundle of components in the fascicle will then retract from the organism and back into the protective labium exterior once more.

== Macro needles versus microneedles ==
Both macro needles and microneedles have had modernized designs inspired by the mosquito proboscis to enhance insertion for medical use. Though they have similar functions, there are some key factors that differentiate macro needles from microneedles.

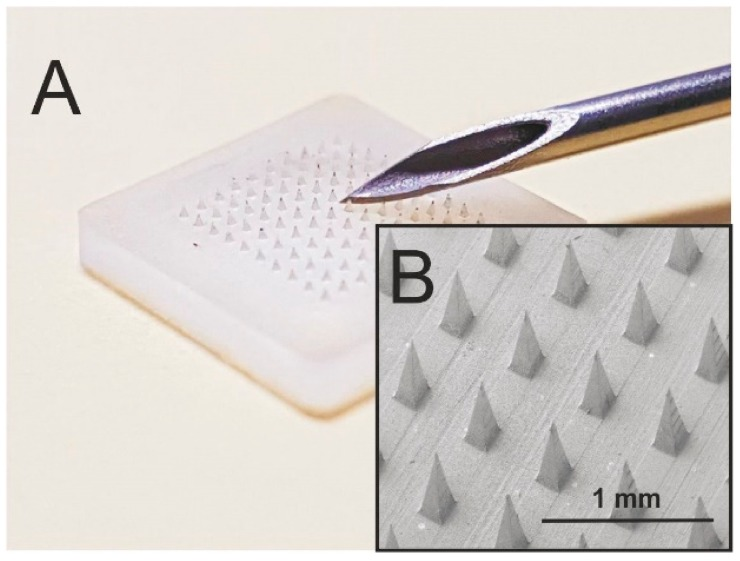
Section A is a comparison between an array of microneedles and a hollow macro needle. Section B is a magnified image of the microneedle array.

Microneedles are micron-scaled needles that are typically used in an array in a patch. The height of the needle typically ranges from 25 to 2500 μm and pierces through the outermost layer of the epidermis of the skin. They are most well known for creating micropores where the drug can be passively absorbed with limited violation to the body.

Microneedles can have different characteristics based on their purpose of application. The most common are solid, hollow, coated, and dissolving needles. Each method has different features that can support different techniques. Overall, they are less destructive and slow-moving methods of injecting drugs.

Macro needles normally used in vaccines and injections. They are larger in size and penetrate around 5/8 to 1 1/2 inches (16 to 38 mm) through the body for a typical vaccine. They are helpful for administering larger volumes of drugs into the body quickly. Hypodermic needles are hollow needles typically made of stainless steel and are most common for administering drugs.

== Microneedle mechanics ==
=== Vibrations ===
Microneedle designs include mimicry of the vibratory aspect of a mosquito proboscis. During insertion, the maxillae vibrate along the longitudinal direction. The two components alternate with back-and-forth motions to reduce insertion force. The jagged edges of the maxillae aid this vibrational motion and cut into the surface. When applying this method to needles, it has been found that a vibratory outer casing decreases the local tissue deformation during insertion. This deformation is decreased further when the outer casing is split to mimic the alternating method of the maxillae. The force created by this motion is significantly smaller than that of synthetic microneedles used in the current medical field. The labrum additionally uses a lower frequency vibrational motion to puncture blood vessels. It may bend and angle to find the correct insertion spot, requiring less force to puncture the softer blood vessel walls.

=== Failure ===
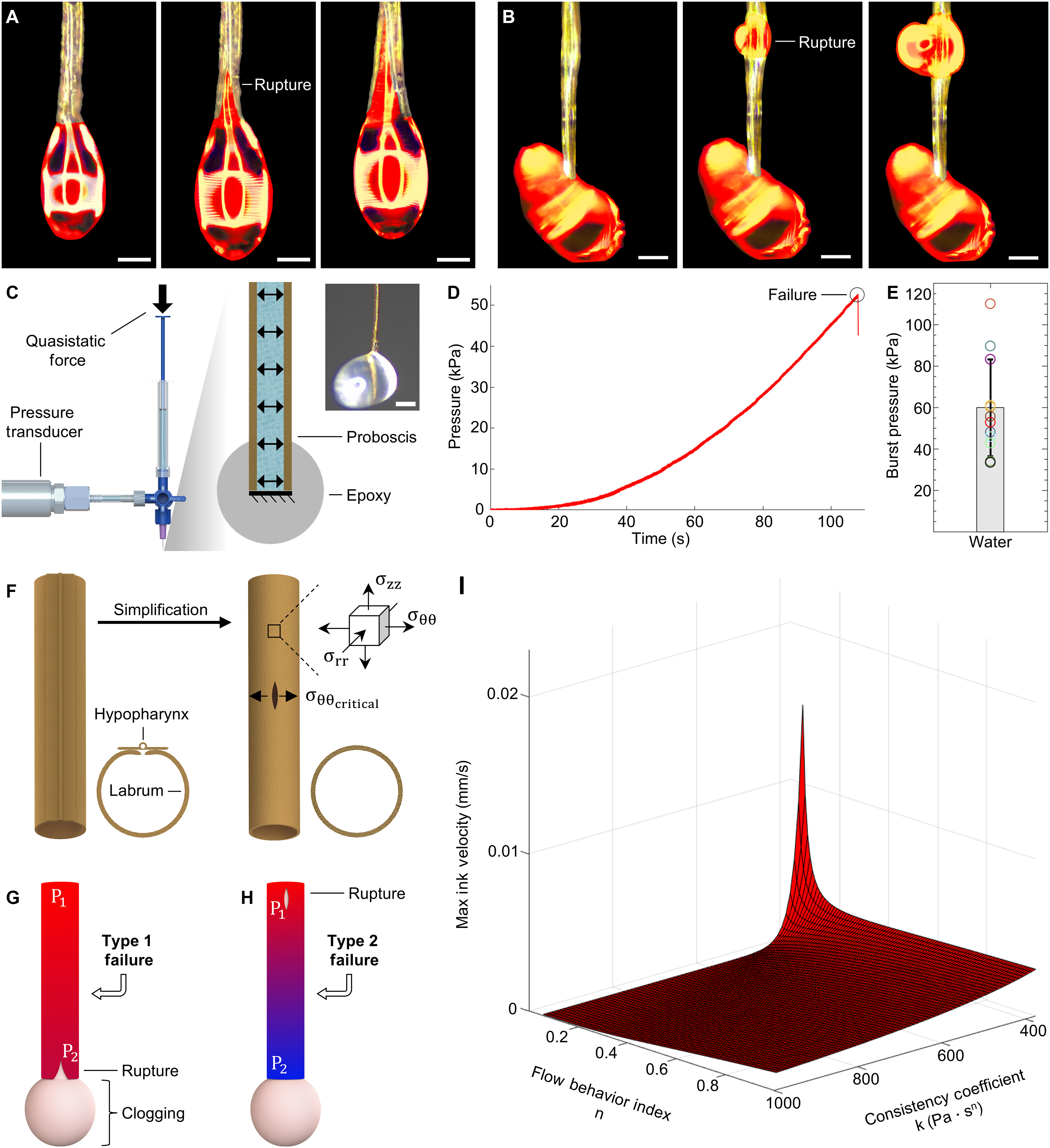
Mechanical failure of female mosquito proboscis dispense tip.

The microneedle of a mosquito has a radius of 10 micrometers. To be comparable to machine-manufactured needles, the proboscis must satisfy the exertion of force in different mechanisms. In compression, the needles buckle with respect to their length; a shorter sample is less likely to buckle than a longer one. The maximum force that a proboscis needle is able to bear is 50 millinewtons before sharply buckling. The needles can handle upwards of 60 kilopascals of pressure. As that pressure is exceeded, axial cracks form along the tip, rupturing at the inlet or outlet of the needle.

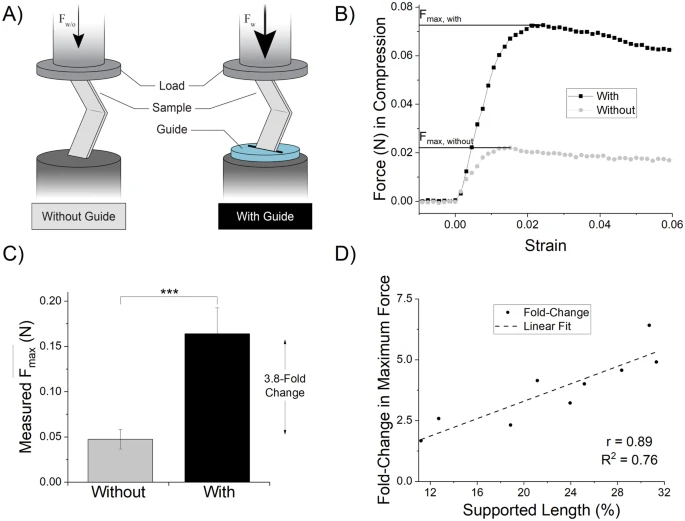
Mechanical testing of proboscis.

The mosquito proboscis has a high critical buckling force and low insertion force on the surface of the tissues. To raise the load required to break the proboscis, the labrum is used as an insertion guide for the inner fascicle of components used for needle insertion. The effective length of the fascicle taking on the load is the primary variable component in the buckling load. Reducing the length of the holding load creates a stronger needle and a higher force required to induce buckling. The labium supports the outside of the fascicle above the surface and reduces the effective length by providing increased lateral protection. This system is loosely modeled by Euler's critical load equation. In a study designing microelectrodes to minimize tissue inflammation, two microneedles were tested for maximum force. One with an insertion guide mimicking the labium of the proboscis, and one without. As seen in the figure below, the presence of the insertion guide drastically increased the maximum force that could be applied to the needle.

== Mosquito proboscis-inspired applications ==
=== 3D-Printing dispense nozzles ===
Micro dispense tips are fluid depositing tubes that eject material from a body. The mosquito proboscis is comparable to apply in engineering due to its minimal curvature, high stiffness, and optimal length. The inner tip diameter of the proboscis is far smaller than any machine-manufactured printing nozzle on the market (35 micrometers, at $80 a piece), extruding lines finer than a human hair. For 3D-printing purposes, this finer-than-ever precision printing has been dubbed "necroprinting" by the engineers at McGill University.

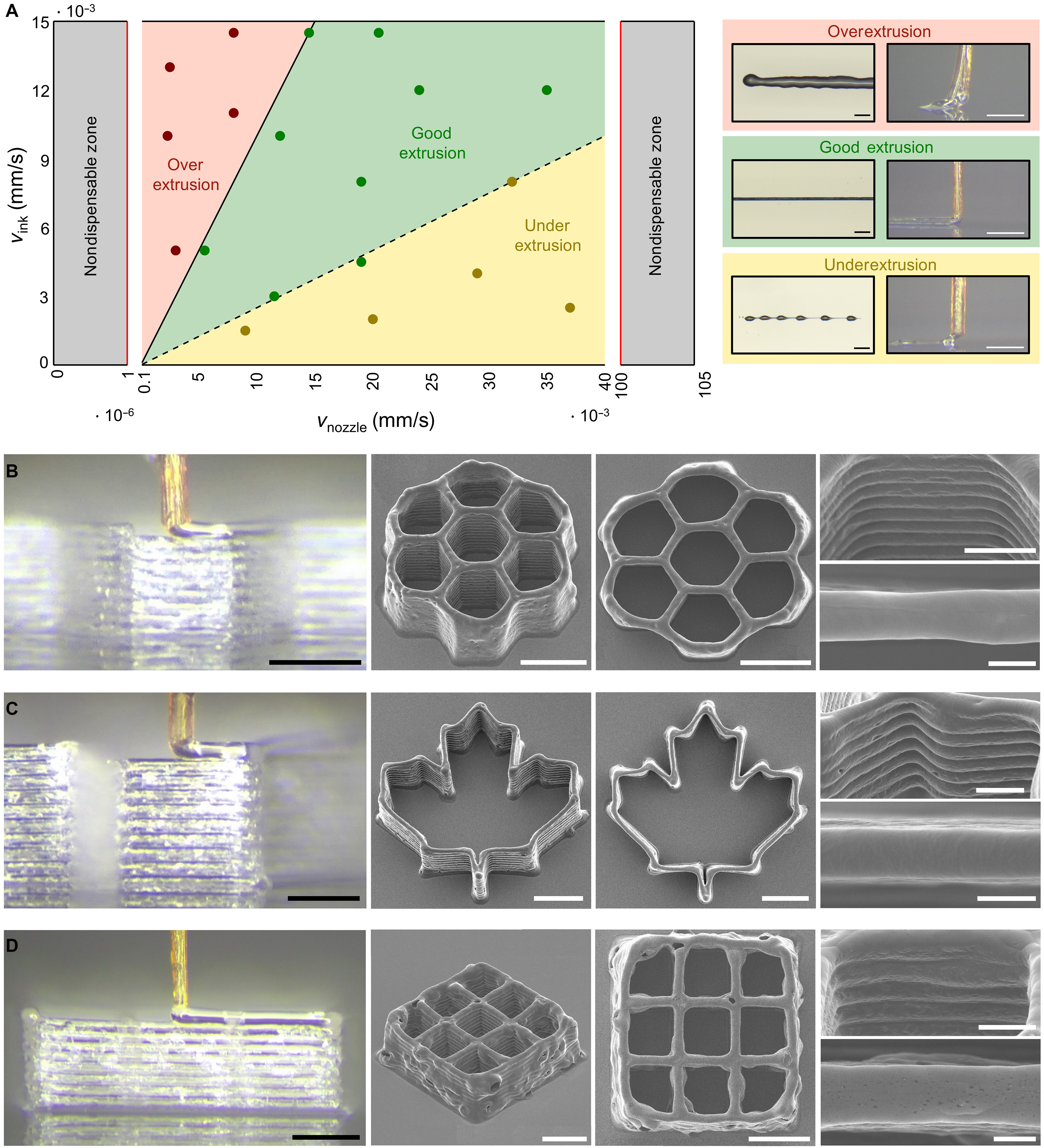
Nozzle deposition rate and 3D Prints made with the proboscis tip.

The needles are biodegradable, making machine parts reusable after the disposal (and biodegradation) of the proboscis attachment. The proboscis is harvested from a euthanized mosquito and fixed to a 3D printing nozzle with UV-cure Resin. Compared to plastic and metal tips, which cannot be fabricated with an inner diameter below 25 micrometers, glass can be used to make 1 micron tips, though they are brittle and difficult to manufacture. The biotic proboscis balances the precision of 20 micrometers with a stiffness of around 200 MPa.

Bio-ink Pluronic F-127 is used to fabricate scaffolds that mimic biological structures such as tissues and blood vessels.

In experiments, scientists were able to produce images at a resolution of 20 micrometers. This is 250% finer than the commercially available, and far more expensive, 36 G tips. Mosquito proboscises are available for $0.80 a piece, harvested in batches of 6 per hour by hand.

=== Research advancements in the fabrication of microneedles ===
Research and experimental methods such as simulation, finite element methods, and electrochemical etching have been conducted to discover ways of implementing the mosquito proboscis design into needle insertion applications.

Simulation

To test the fabricated proboscis-like microneedles, simulations of insertion into a skin-like replica were used. The needle is fixed on a moving stage and, slowly and under constant force, moved to the skin-like material until penetration. This will test the effect of resistance to the force versus the displacement of the needle. Other variables to study when simulating and fabricating these microneedles include changing the tip angle, the width of needles, and the use of vibrations during penetration. The vibration used for testing imitates the mosquito's proboscis motion. Changing the surface of the material will be used to imitate the mosquito's penetrating motion to allow for the simulation of that movement.

Finite element method

The Finite element method (FEM) is another way to analyze the design of the proboscis microneedle. The needle's jagged shape and insertion are investigated using FEM due to the proboscis makeup, which is 2 outer jagged maxillae and a center straight labrum. These three, in conjunction, were tested to look at the stress put on the inner needles while looking at how the outer needle is impacted. The insertion method affects the needle's ability to penetrate by increasing surface tension in the skin, so the straight needle's center penetrates the skin.

Electrochemical etching

The maxilla in the mosquito proboscis are a fabrication research focus due to its sharp, jagged teeth that function as a less painful insertion design. Due to its small and thin size, it has been difficult to synthetically fabricate. Electrochemical etching has been used as a method to sharpen the small jagged teeth similar to the maxilla. Electrochemical etching is typically known for polishing materials for analysis. In this method, electrochemical etching is used on a notched silicon needle. The etching process degrades the material around the notches to create a sharper point. Results found that it was possible to create a maxilla mosquito proboscis-inspired needle, but due to the inconsistency of the electrochemical etching process and brittleness of the material at a small scale, the silicone needle would risk breaking during use.

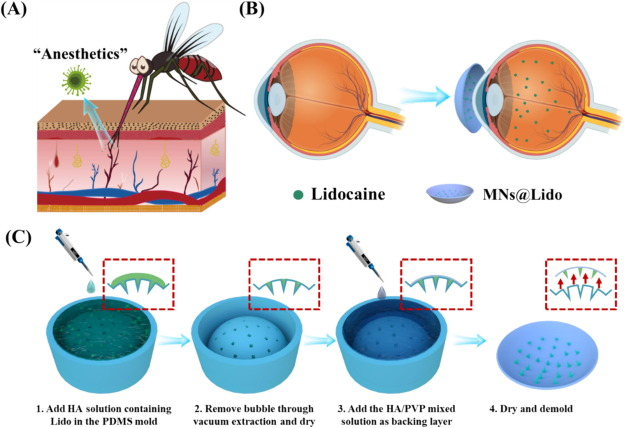
Schematic diagram of dissolvable microneedle design for local anesthesia in ophthalmic surgeries Mosquito-inspired insertion guide to reduce buckling of flexible microelectrodes

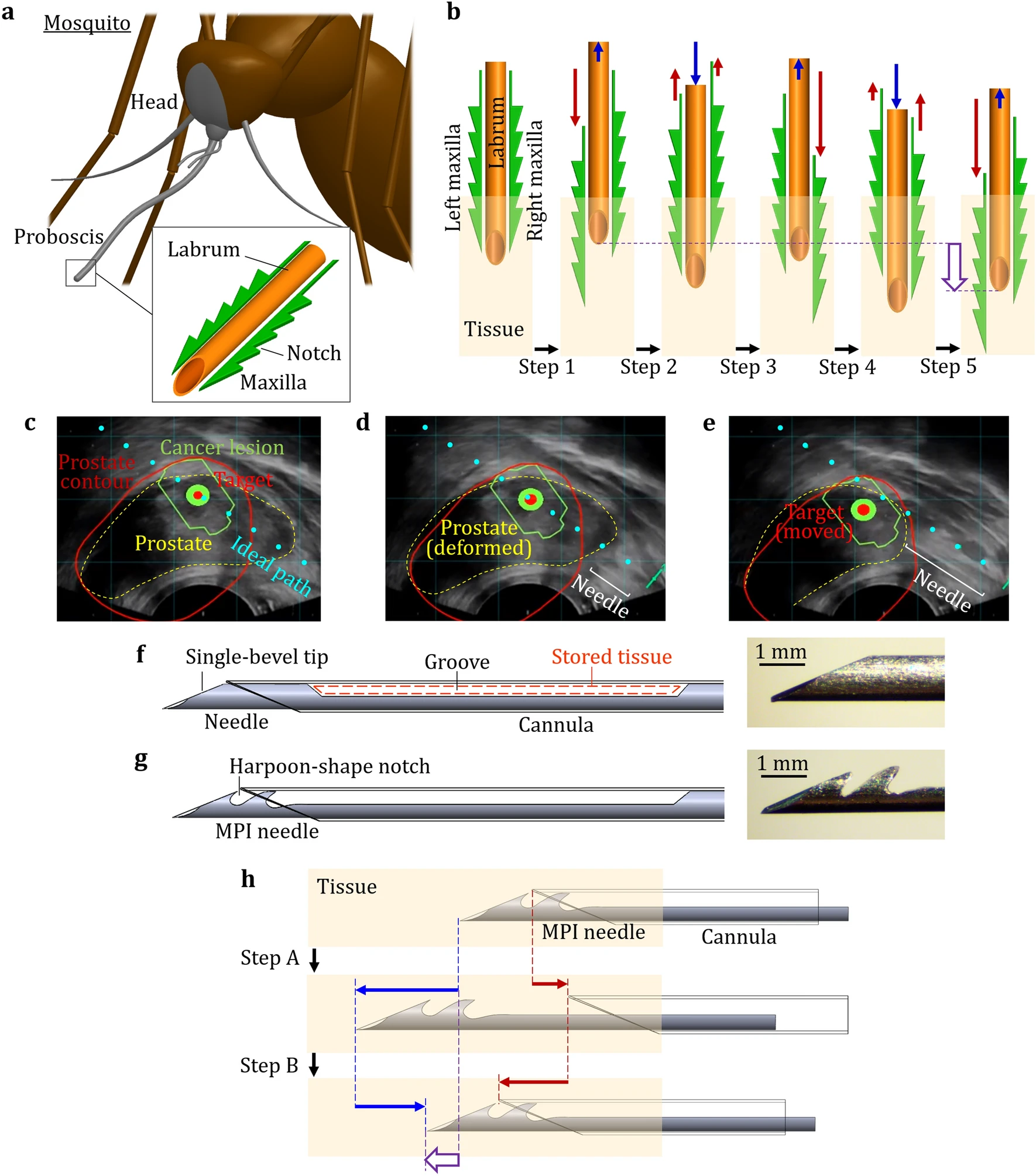
Mosquito proboscis-inspired needle insertion to reduce tissue deformation and organ displacement. Part (a) shows a simplified mosquito proboscis that can be used as a model for macro needles. Part (f) shows a classical biopsy needle.

=== Medical advancements in pain-less microneedles ===
==== Microneedle patches ====
Microneedle patches are being developed to help with needle phobia and create a painless way to deliver drugs in a minimally invasive way. There are two parts to microneedles: the needle itself and the patch that they are attached to. These applied to the skin allow for a transdermal insertion of the drug chosen to be used. There are many different microneedle patches, including solid, coated, hollow, and degradable. These types of microneedles have changed the way of drug delivery. The use of dissolvable microneedle patches has become popular due to the ease of letting the patch dissipate and allowing for safer internal use, due to the way it can easily degrade. Especially the use of microneedle patches for topical local anesthetic purposes. The use of the mosquito proboscis is a model to create painless microneedle patches used for all applications in the body.

==== Microelectrodes ====
Microelectrodes, specifically used for intracortical implants, must have high strength and induce minimal tissue deformation. Inspiration drawn from the use of the proboscis labium as an insertion guide has been implemented in biomimetic microelectrode development. The implementation of an insertion guide was found to increase the percentage of correct microelectrode insertion, as well as the maximum force that could be applied before the device was damaged. The insertion guide aids in supporting the needle and increasing the critical buckling force. In order for the microelectrodes to insert through the dura mater, the extra support of this guide became critical.

==== Biopsy sampling ====
A significant concern during biopsy sampling is tissue deformation. Tissue deformation may result in inaccurate sampling of the area of concern, which can lead to misdiagnosis. By implementing the mosquito fascicle vibratory insertion and the serrated maxilla, the tissue deformation and insertion force is decreased. Tissue deformation was tested with and without vibrational insertion. The vibrating insertion decreased the tissue displacement and force required to insert the needle. Serrated maxilla, modeled with harpoon-shaped notches, deformed the least amount of tissue and required the lowest insertion force.
