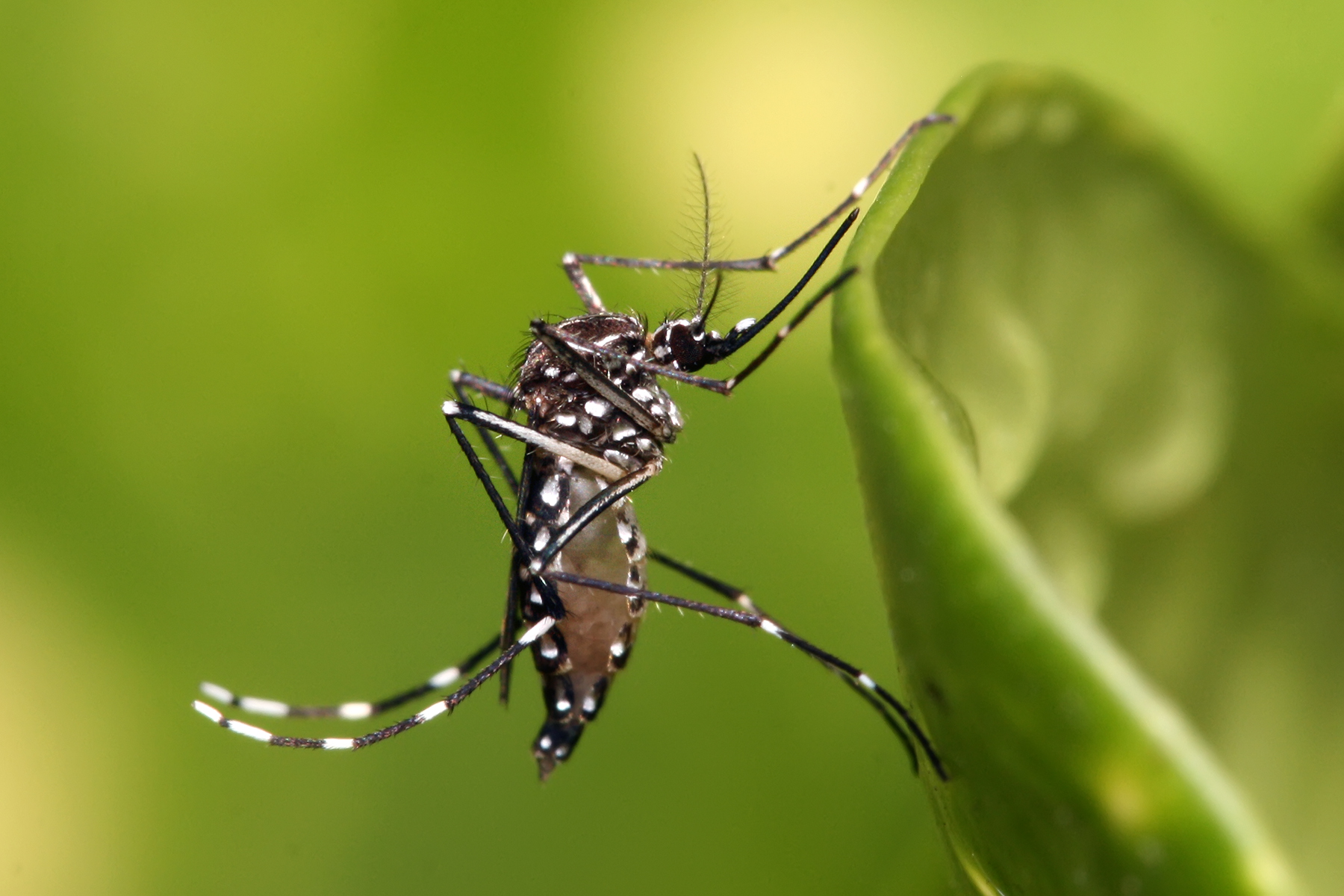
- Aedes aegypti, the main vector of yellow fever

Scientific classification
- Kingdom: Animalia
- Phylum: Arthropoda
- Clade: Pancrustacea
- Class: Insecta
- Order: Diptera
- Superfamily: Culicoidea
- Family: Culicidae; Meigen, 1818

Subfamilies
- Anophelinae; Culicinae

Diversity
- 112 genera

= Mosquito =

Mosquito Temporal range: 99–0 Ma Late Cretaceous (Cenomanian) – Recent

Family of flies

Mosquitoes, the Culicidae, are a family of small flies consisting of 3,600 species. The word mosquito (formed by mosca and diminutive -ito) is Spanish and Portuguese for little fly. Mosquitoes have a slender, segmented body, one pair of wings, three pairs of long hair-like legs, and a specialized, highly elongated set of mouthparts forming a proboscis, adapted for piercing and sucking. All mosquitoes drink nectar from flowers; females of many species have adapted to also drink blood. The group diversified during the Cretaceous period. Evolutionary biologists view mosquitoes as micropredators, small animals that parasitise larger ones by drinking their blood without immediately killing them. Medical parasitologists view mosquitoes as vectors of disease, carrying protozoan parasites or bacterial or viral pathogens from one host to another.

The mosquito lifecycle consists of four stages: egg, larva, pupa, and adult. Eggs are laid on the water surface; they hatch into motile larvae that feed on aquatic algae and organic material. These larvae are important food sources for many freshwater animals, such as dragonfly nymphs, many fish, and some birds. Adult females of many species have mouthparts adapted to pierce the skin of a host and feed on blood of a wide range of vertebrate hosts, and some invertebrates, primarily other arthropods. Some species only produce eggs after a blood meal.

The mosquito's saliva is transferred to the host during the bite, and can cause an itchy rash. In addition, blood-feeding species can ingest pathogens while biting and transmit them to other hosts. Those species include vectors of parasitic diseases such as malaria and filariasis, and arboviral diseases such as yellow fever and dengue fever. By transmitting diseases, mosquitoes cause the deaths of over one million people each year.

== Description and life cycle ==

Like all flies, mosquitoes go through four stages in their lifecycles: egg, larva, pupa, and adult. The first three stages—egg, larva, and pupa—are largely aquatic, the eggs usually being laid in stagnant water. They hatch to become larvae, which feed, grow, and molt until they change into pupae. The adult mosquito emerges from the mature pupa as it floats at the water surface. Mosquitoes have adult lifespans ranging from as short as a week to around a month. Some species overwinter as adults in diapause.

=== Adult ===
Mosquitoes have one pair of wings, with distinct scales on the surface. Their wings are long and narrow, while the legs are long and thin. The body, usually grey or black, is slender, and typically 3–6 mm long. When at rest, mosquitoes hold their first pair of legs outwards, whereas the somewhat similar Chironomid midges hold these legs forwards. Anopheles mosquitoes can fly for up to four hours continuously at 1 to 2 km/h (0.62 to 1.24 mph), traveling up to 12 km (7.5 mi) in a night. Males beat their wings between 450 and 600 times per second, driven indirectly by muscles which vibrate the thorax. Mosquitoes are mainly small flies; the largest are in the genus Toxorhynchites, at up to 18 mm (0.71 in) in length and 24 mm (0.94 in) in wingspan. Those in the genus Aedes are much smaller, with a wingspan of 2.8 to 4.4 mm (0.11 to 0.17 in).

Mosquitoes can develop from egg to adult in hot weather in as few as five days, but it may take up to a month. At dawn or dusk, within days of pupating, males assemble in swarms, mating when females fly in. The female mates only once in her lifetime, attracted by the pheromones emitted by the male. In species that need blood for the eggs to develop, the female finds a host and drinks a full meal of blood. She then rests for two or three days to digest the meal and allow her eggs to develop. She is then ready to lay the eggs and repeat the cycle of feeding and laying. Females can live for up to three weeks in the wild, depending on temperature, humidity, their ability to obtain a blood meal, and avoiding being killed by their vertebrate hosts.

Anatomy of an adult female mosquito

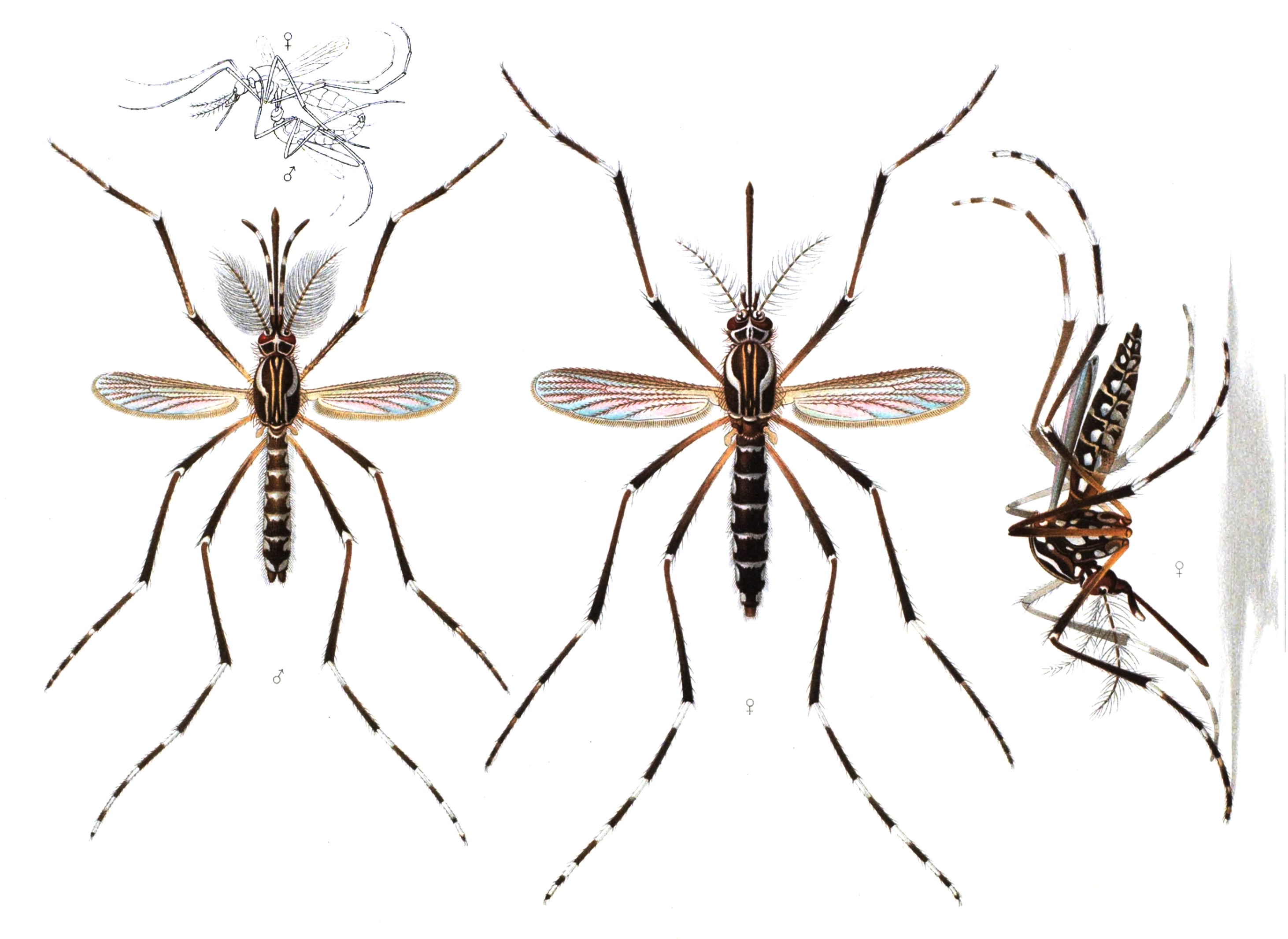
Adult yellow fever mosquito Aedes aegypti, typical of subfamily Culicinae. Male (left) has bushy antennae and longer palps than female (right)

=== Eggs ===
The eggs of most mosquitoes are laid in stagnant water, which may be a pond, a marsh, a temporary puddle, a water-filled hole in a tree, or the water-trapping leaf axils of a bromeliad. Some lay near the water's edge while others attach their eggs to aquatic plants. A few, like Opifex fuscus, can breed in salt-marshes. Wyeomyia smithii breeds in the pitchers of pitcher plants, its larvae feeding on decaying insects that have drowned there.

Oviposition, egg-laying, varies between species. Anopheles females fly over the water, touching down or dapping to place eggs on the surface one at a time; their eggs are roughly cigar-shaped and have floats down their sides. A female can lay 100–200 eggs in her lifetime. Aedes females drop their eggs singly, on damp mud or other surfaces near water; their eggs hatch only when they are flooded. Females in genera such as Culex, Culiseta, and Uranotaenia lay their eggs in floating rafts. Mansonia females in contrast lay their eggs in arrays, attached usually to the under-surfaces of waterlily pads.

Clutches of eggs of most mosquito species hatch simultaneously, but Aedes eggs in diapause hatch irregularly over an extended period.

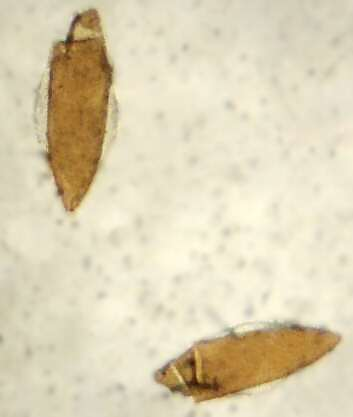
Anopheles eggs with side floats

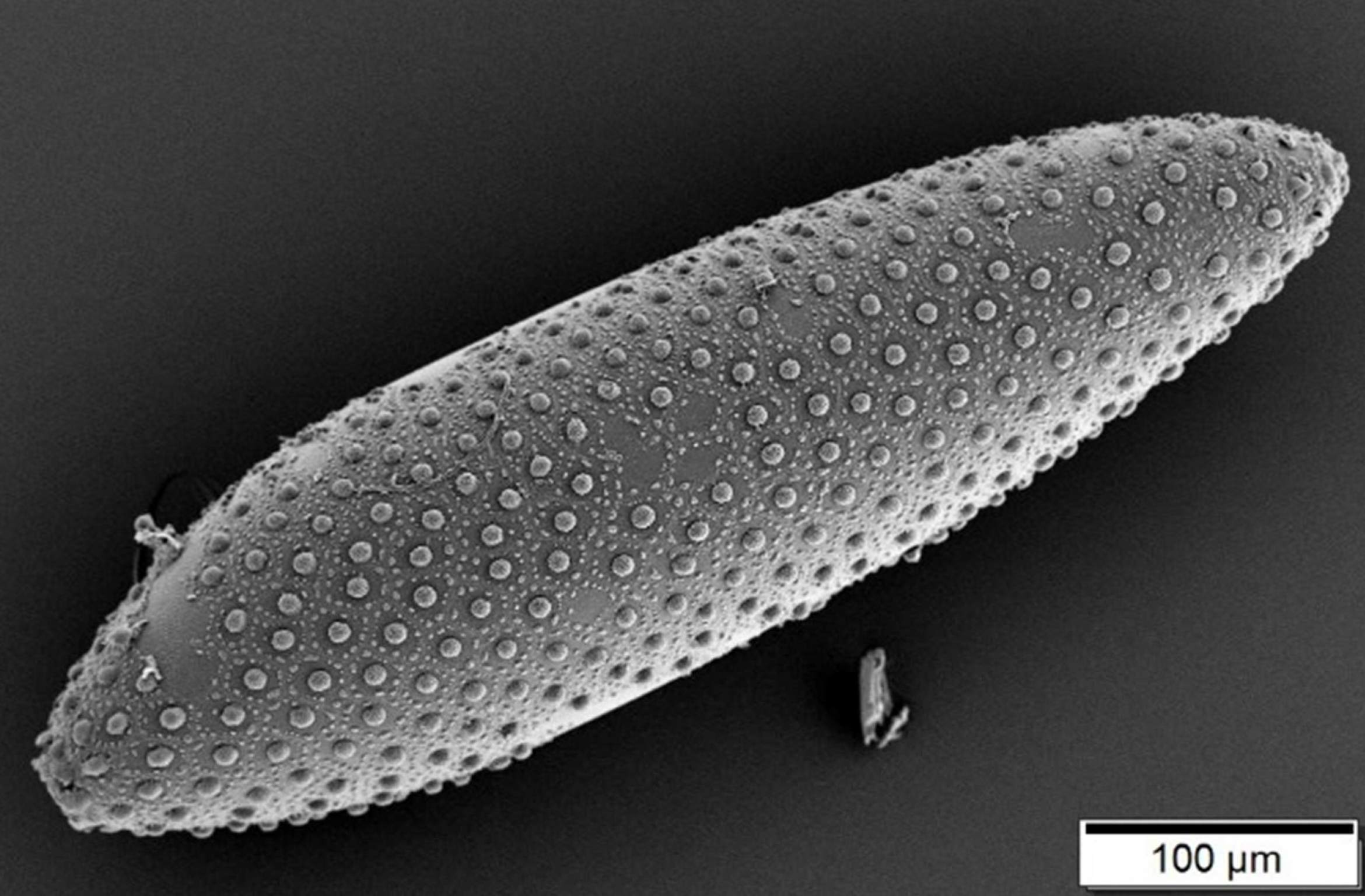
Electron micrograph of a culicine egg

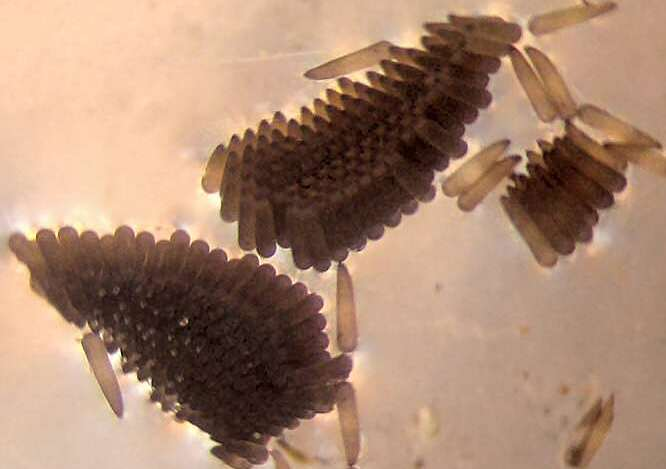
Culex egg raft

=== Larva ===
The mosquito larva's head has prominent mouth brushes used for feeding, a large thorax with no legs, and a segmented abdomen. It breathes air through a siphon on its abdomen, so must come to the surface frequently. It spends most of its time feeding on algae, bacteria, and other microbes in the water's surface layer. It dives below the surface when disturbed. It swims either by propelling itself with its mouth brushes, or by jerkily wriggling its body. It develops through several stages, or instars, molting each time, after which it metamorphoses into a pupa. Aedes larvae, except when very young, can withstand drying; they go into diapause for several months if their pond dries out.

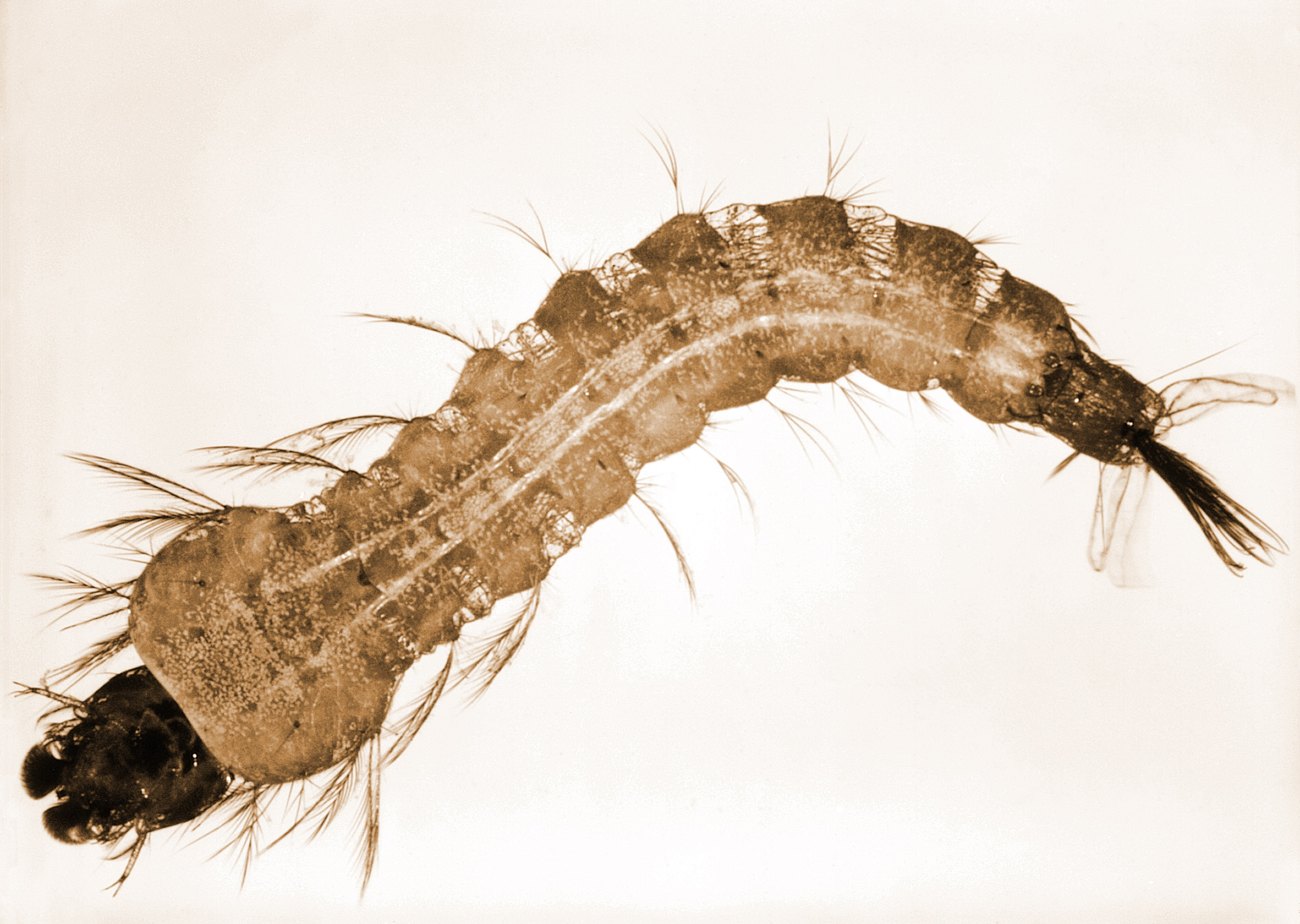
Anopheles larva

Anatomy of a Culex larva

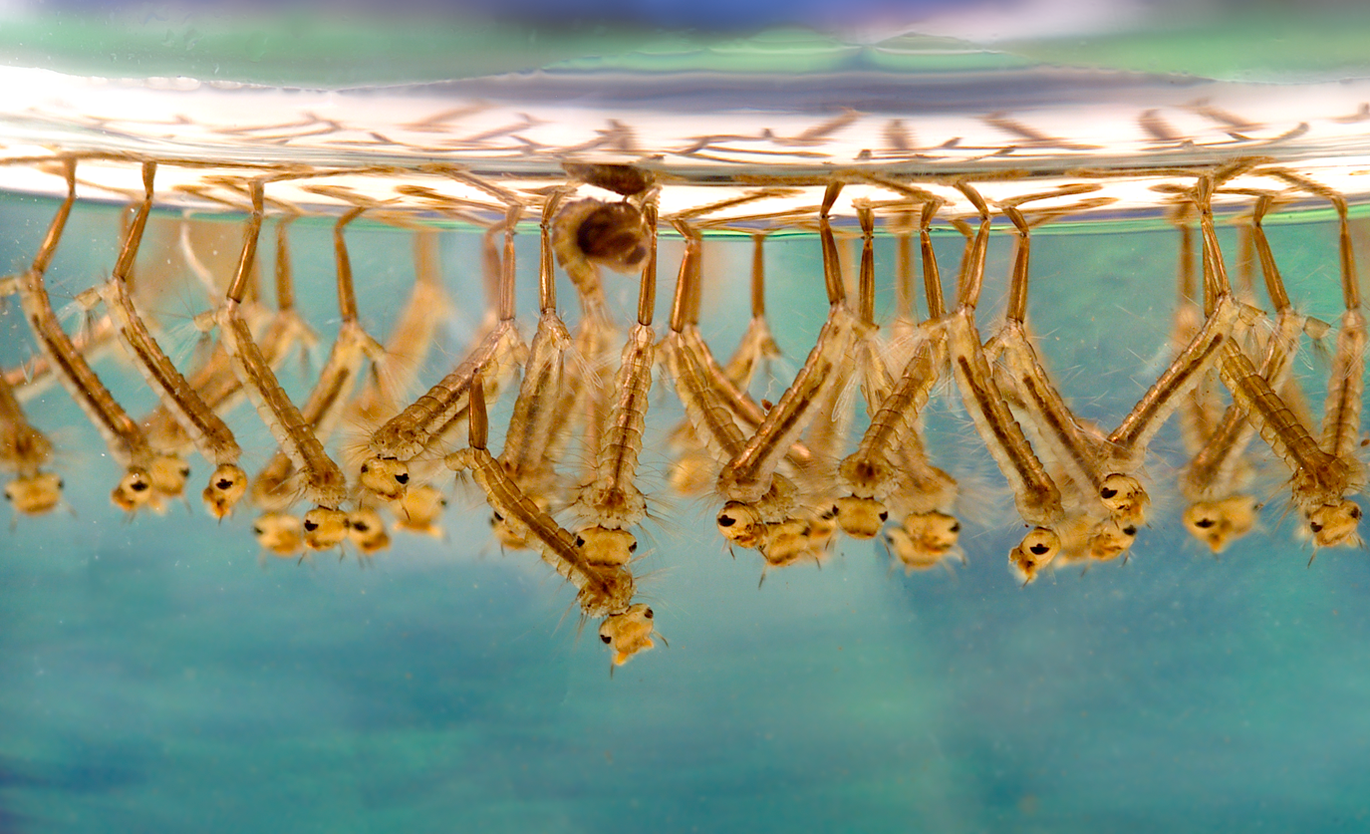
Culex larvae plus one pupa

=== Pupa ===
The head and thorax of the pupa are merged into a cephalothorax, with the abdomen curving around beneath it. The pupa or "tumbler" can swim actively by flipping its abdomen. Like the larva, the pupa of most species must come to the surface frequently to breathe, which they do through a pair of respiratory trumpets on their cephalothoraxes. They do not feed; they pass much of their time hanging from the surface of the water by their respiratory trumpets. If alarmed, they swim downwards by flipping their abdomens in much the same way as the larvae. If undisturbed, they soon float up again. The adult emerges from the pupa at the surface of the water and flies off.

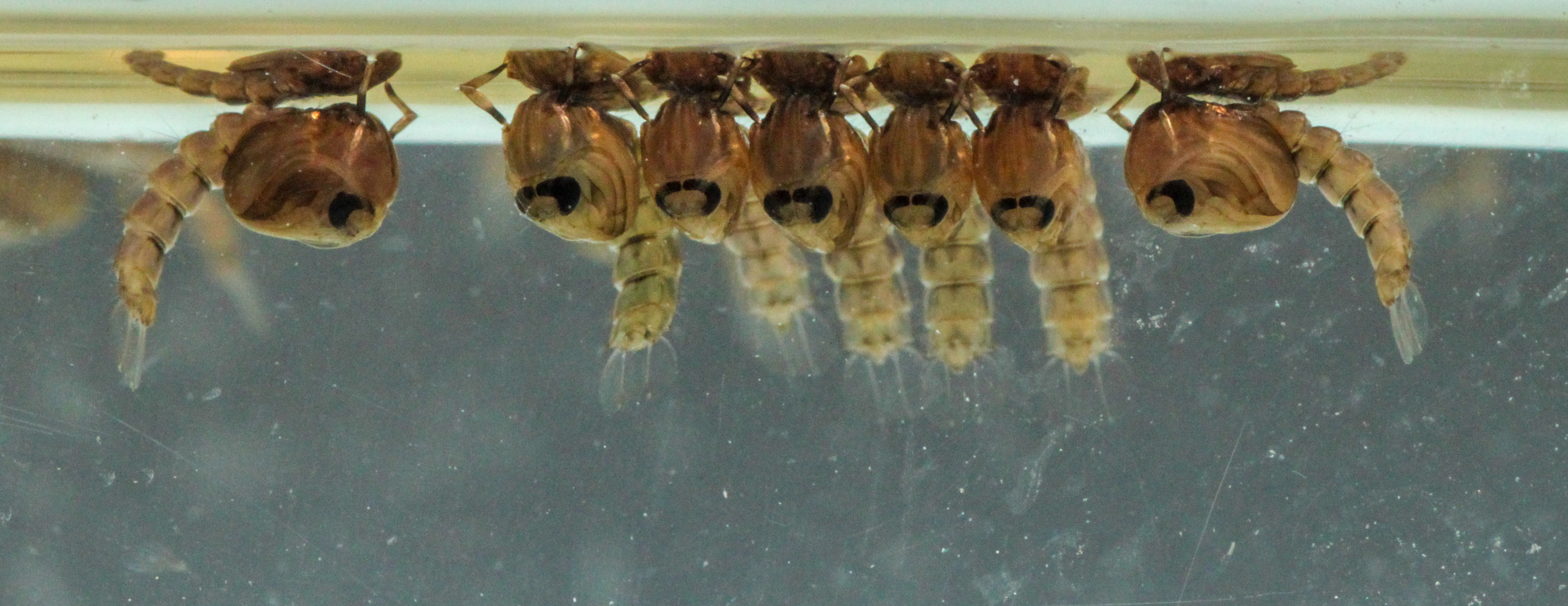
Mosquito pupae, shortly before the adults emerged. The head and thorax are fused into the cephalothorax.

== Feeding by adults ==
=== Diet ===
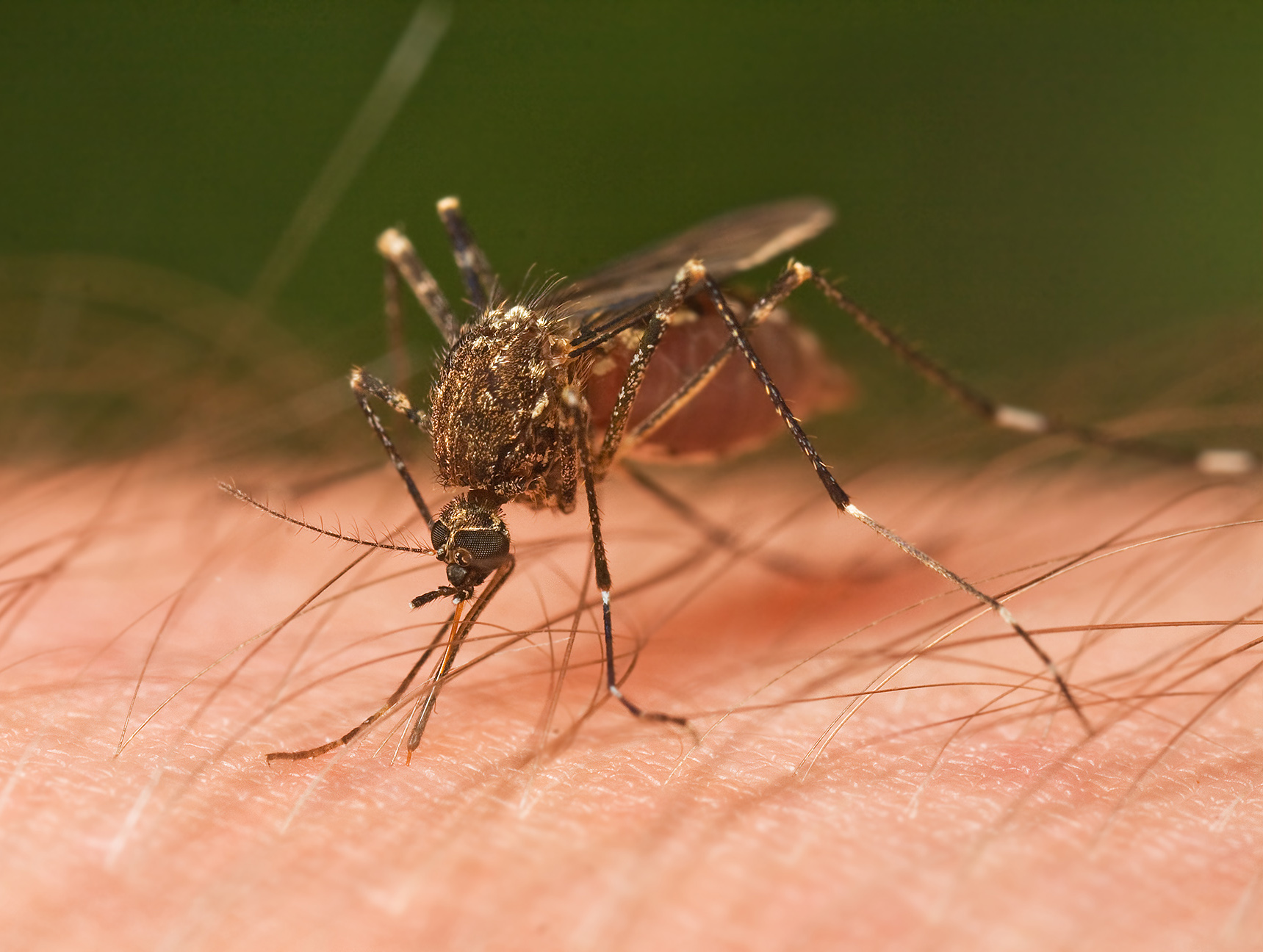
Female Aedes sp. feeding on blood from a human arm.

Both male and female mosquitoes feed on nectar, aphid honeydew, and plant juices, but in many species the females are also hematophagous (blood-sucking) ectoparasites. In some of those species, a blood meal is essential for egg production; in others, it just enables the female to lay more eggs. Both plant materials and blood are useful sources of energy in the form of sugars. Blood supplies more concentrated nutrients, such as lipids, but the main function of blood meals is to obtain proteins for egg production. Disease vector mosquitoes like Anopheles and Aedes are anautogenous, requiring blood to lay eggs. Some Culex species are partially autogenous, needing blood only for their second and subsequent clutches of eggs. The three genera of Malaya, Topomyia and Toxorhynchites, together comprising a small percentage of mosquitoes species, reproduce autogenously, never taking blood.

=== Host animals ===
Blood-sucking mosquitoes favour particular host species, though they are less selective when food is short. Different mosquito species favour amphibians, reptiles including snakes, birds, and mammals. For example, Culiseta melanura sucks the blood of passerine birds, but as mosquito numbers rise they attack mammals including horses and humans, causing epidemics of Eastern equine encephalitis virus in North America. Loss of blood from many bites can add up to a large volume, occasionally causing the death of livestock as large as cattle and horses. Malaria-transmitting mosquitoes seek out caterpillars and feed on their haemolymph, impeding their development.

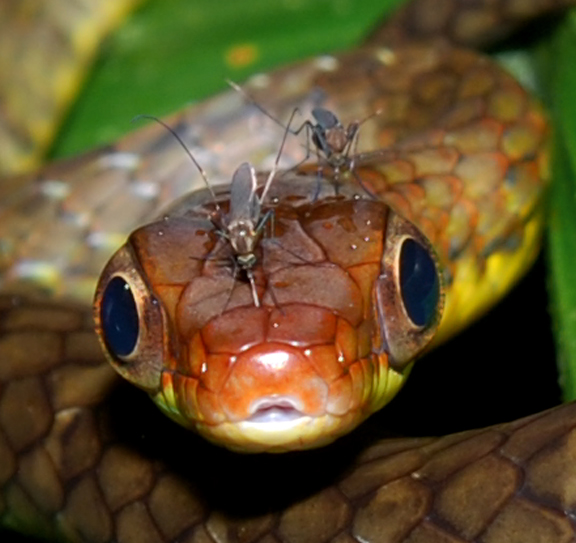
Feeding on a snake

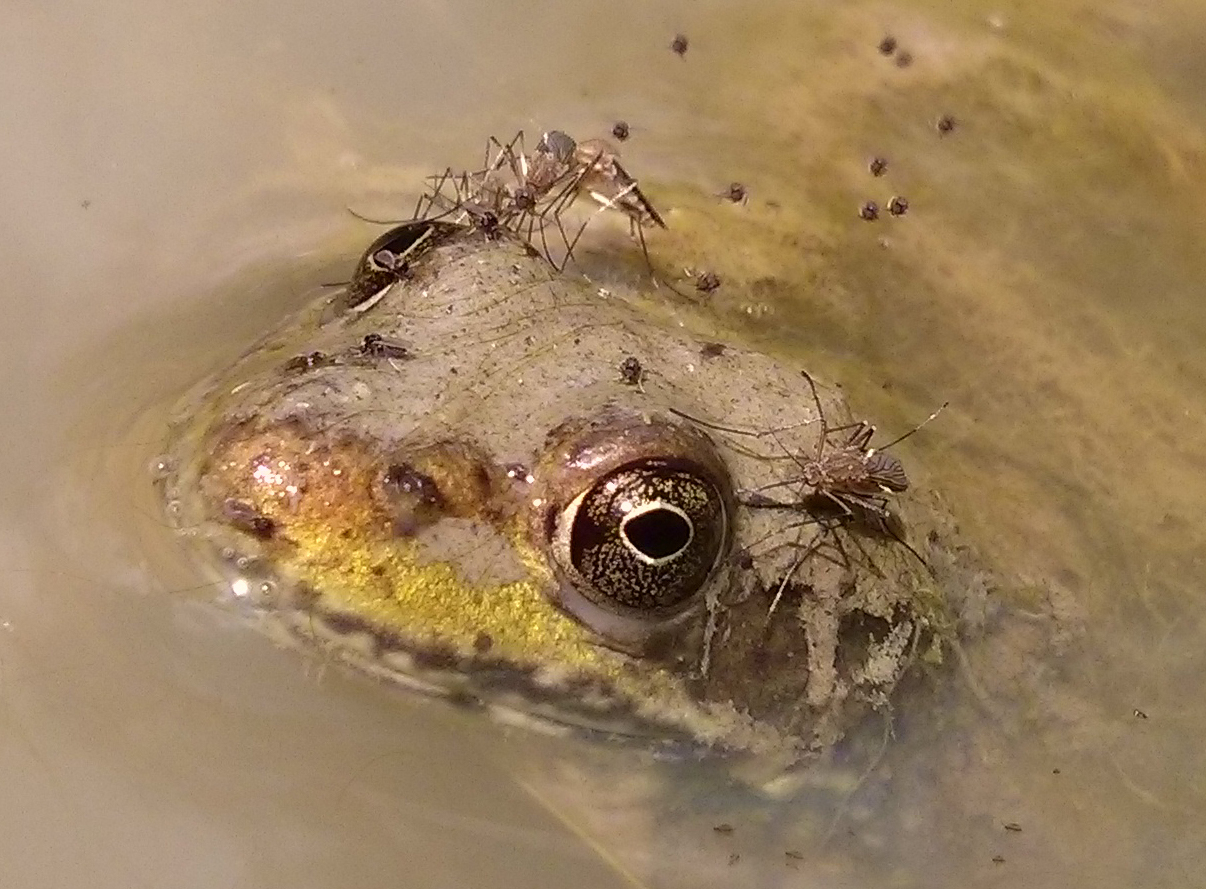
Feeding on a frog

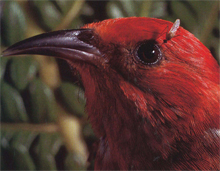
Feeding on a bird

=== Finding hosts ===
Blood-feeding female mosquitoes find their hosts using multiple cues, including exhaled carbon dioxide, heat, and many different odorants.

Most mosquito species are crepuscular, feeding at dawn or dusk, and resting in a cool place through the heat of the day. Some species, such as the Asian tiger mosquito, are known to fly and feed during daytime. Female mosquitoes hunt for hosts by smelling substances such as carbon dioxide (CO_{2}) and 1-octen-3-ol (mushroom alcohol, found in exhaled breath) produced from the host, and through visual recognition. The semiochemical that most strongly attracts Culex quinquefasciatus is nonanal. Another attractant is sulcatone. A large part of the mosquito's sense of smell, or olfactory system, is devoted to sniffing out blood sources. Of 72 types of odor receptors on its antennae, at least 27 are tuned to detect chemicals found in perspiration. In Aedes, the search for a host takes place in two phases. First, the mosquito flies about until it detects a host's odorants; then it flies towards them, using the concentration of odorants as its guide. Mosquitoes prefer to feed on people with type O blood, an abundance of skin bacteria, and high body heat; they also favor pregnant women. Individuals' attractiveness to mosquitoes has a heritable, genetically controlled component.

The multitude of characteristics in a host observed by the mosquito allows it to select a host to feed on. It activates odour and visual search behaviours that it otherwise would not use, when in presence of CO_{2}. In terms of a mosquito's olfactory system, chemical analysis has revealed that people who are highly attractive to mosquitoes produce significantly more carboxylic acids. A human's unique body odour indicates that the target is actually a human host rather than some other living warm-blooded animal (as the presence of CO_{2} shows). Body odour, composed of volatile organic compounds emitted from the skin of humans, is the most important cue used by mosquitoes. Many of these volatile odor compounds (VOCs) are produced when skin-associated bacteria metabolize components of sweat and sebum, contributing to individual variation in human odour profiles. Variation in skin odour is caused by body weight, hormones, genetic factors, and metabolic or genetic disorders. Infections such as malaria can influence an individual's body odour. People infected by malaria produce relatively large amounts of Plasmodium-induced aldehydes in the skin, creating large cues for mosquitoes as it increases the attractiveness of an odour blend, imitating a "healthy" human odour. Infected individuals produce larger amounts of aldehydes heptanal, octanal, and nonanal. These compounds are detected by mosquito antennae. Thus, people infected with malaria are more prone to be bitten by mosquitoes.

Contributing to a mosquito's ability to activate search behaviours, a mosquito's visual search system includes sensitivity to wavelengths from different colours. Mosquitoes are attracted to longer wavelengths, correlated to the colours of red and orange as seen by humans, and range through the spectrum of human skin tones. In addition, they have a strong attraction to dark, high-contrast objects, because of how longer wavelengths are perceived against a lighter-coloured background.

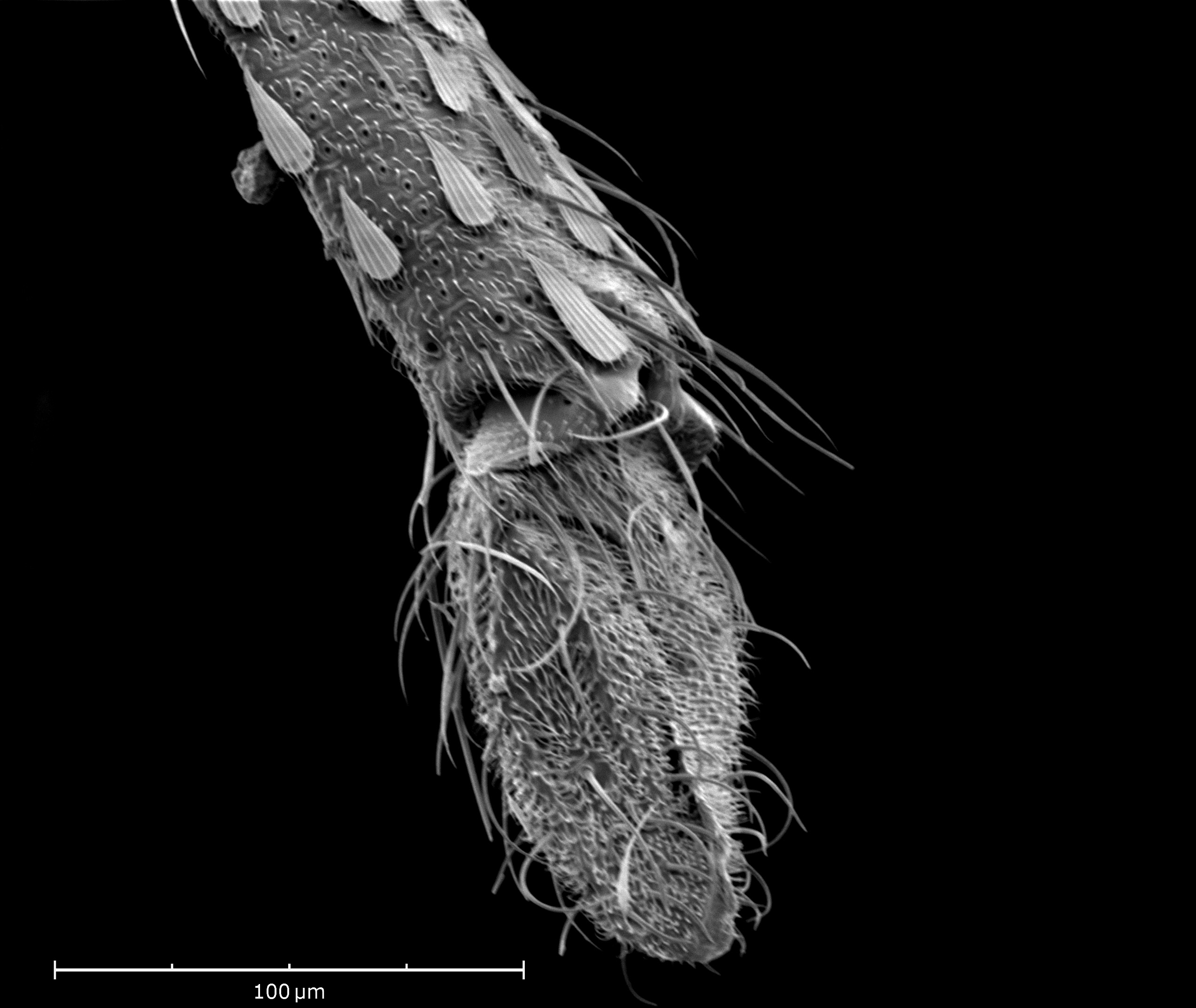
Scanning electron microscope image of the labium tip of a Culex mosquito

Different species of mosquitoes have evolved different methods of identifying target hosts. Study of a domestic form and an animal-biting form of the mosquito Aedes aegypti showed that the evolution of preference for human odour is linked to increases in the expression of the olfactory receptor AaegOr4. This recognises a compound present at high levels in human odour called sulcatone. However, the malaria mosquito Anopheles gambiae also has OR4 genes strongly activated by sulcatone, yet none of them are closely related to AaegOr4, suggesting that the two species have evolved to specialise in biting humans independently.

=== Mouthparts ===
Female mosquito mouthparts are highly adapted to piercing skin and sucking blood. Males only drink sugary fluids, and have less specialized mouthparts.

Externally, the most obvious feeding structure of the mosquito is the proboscis, composed of the labium, U-shaped in section like a rain gutter, which sheaths a bundle (fascicle) of six piercing mouthparts or stylets. These are two mandibles, two maxillae, the hypopharynx, and the labrum. The labium bends back into a bow when the mosquito begins to bite, staying in contact with the skin and guiding the stylets downwards. The extremely sharp tips of the labrum and maxillae are moved backwards and forwards to saw their way into the skin, with just one thousandth of the force that would be needed to penetrate the skin with a needle, resulting in a painless insertion.

Evolution of mosquito mouthparts, with grasshopper mouthparts (shown both in situ and separately) representing a more primitive condition. All the mouthparts except the labium are stylets, formed into a fascicle or bundle.

Mouthparts of a female mosquito while feeding on blood, showing the flexible labium sheath supporting the piercing and sucking tube which penetrates the host's skin

=== Saliva ===
Mosquito saliva contains enzymes that aid in sugar feeding, and antimicrobial agents that control bacterial growth in the sugar meal.

For a mosquito to obtain a blood meal, it must circumvent its vertebrate host's physiological responses. Mosquito saliva blocks the host's hemostasis system, with proteins that reduce vascular constriction, blood clotting, and platelet aggregation, to ensure the blood keeps flowing. It modulates the host's immune response via a mixture of proteins which lower angiogenesis and immunity, create inflammation, suppress tumor necrosis factor release from activated mast cells, suppress interleukin (IL)-2 and IFN-γ production, suppress T cell populations, decrease expression of interferon−α/β making virus infections more severe, increase natural killer T cells in the blood, and decrease cytokine production.

=== Egg development and blood digestion ===
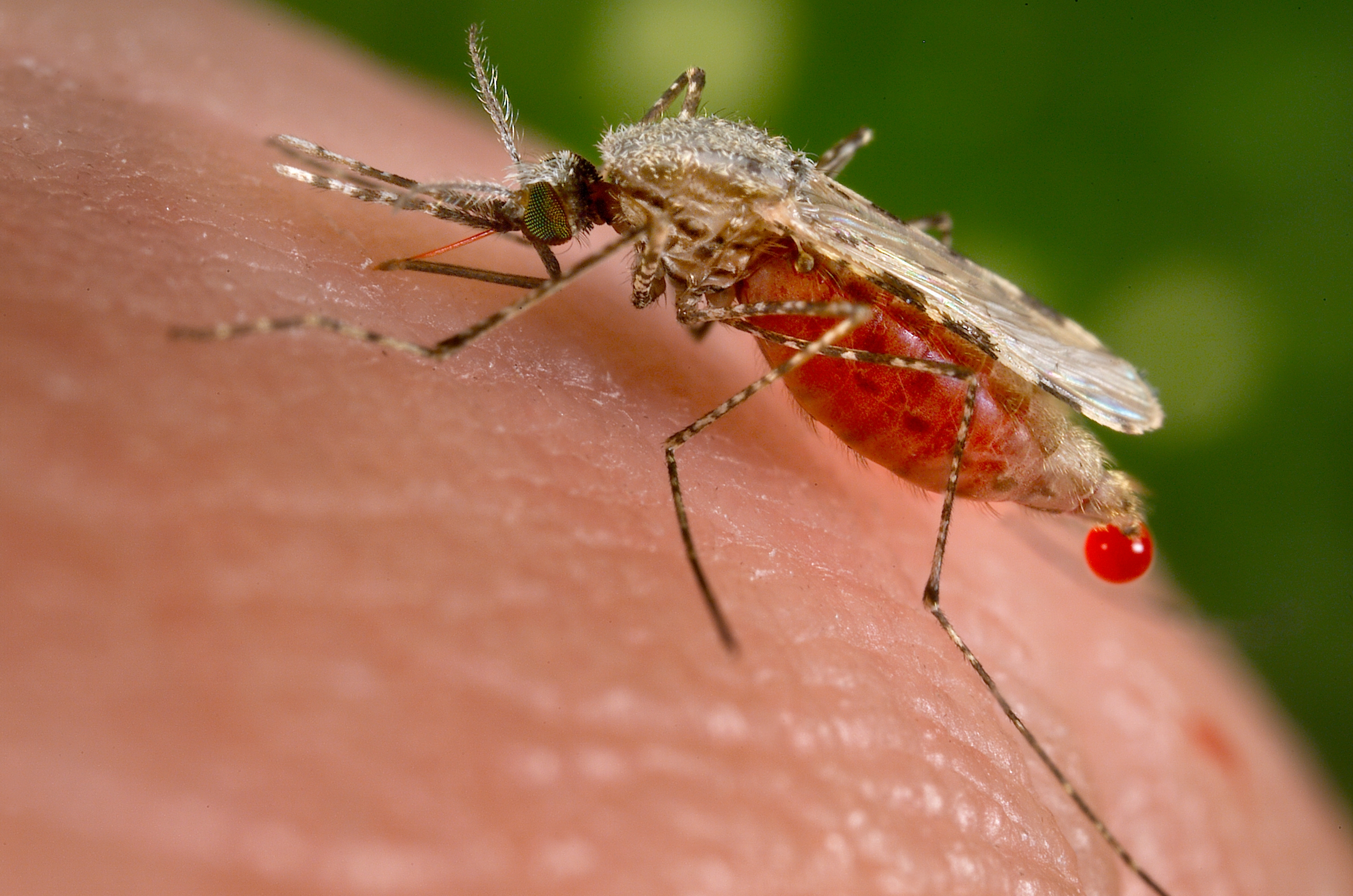
An Anopheles stephensi female is engorged with blood and beginning to pass unwanted liquid fractions to make room in its gut for more of the solid nutrients.

Females of many blood-feeding species need a blood meal to begin the process of egg development. A sufficiently large blood meal triggers a hormonal cascade that leads to egg development. Upon completion of feeding, the mosquito withdraws her proboscis, and as the gut fills up, the stomach lining secretes a peritrophic membrane that surrounds the blood. This keeps the blood separate from anything else in the stomach. Like many Hemiptera that survive on dilute liquid diets, many adult mosquitoes excrete surplus liquid even when feeding. This permits females to accumulate a full meal of nutrient solids. The blood meal is digested over a period of several days. Once blood is in the stomach, the midgut synthesizes protease enzymes, primarily trypsin assisted by aminopeptidase, that hydrolyze the blood proteins into free amino acids. These are used in the synthesis of vitellogenin, which in turn is made into egg yolk protein.

== Distribution ==
=== Cosmopolitan ===
Mosquitoes have a cosmopolitan distribution, occurring in every land region except Antarctica and a few islands. The polar or subpolar climate of these regions is unpredictable, freezing but often warming suddenly in mid-winter, making mosquitoes emerge from pupae in diapause, and then freezing again before they can complete their life cycle.

Eggs of temperate zone mosquitoes are more tolerant of cold than the eggs of species indigenous to warmer regions. Many can tolerate subzero temperatures, while adults of some species can survive winter by sheltering in microhabitats such as buildings or hollow trees. In warm and humid tropical regions, some mosquito species are active for the entire year, but in temperate and cold regions they hibernate or enter diapause. Arctic or subarctic mosquitoes, like some other arctic midges in families such as Simuliidae and Ceratopogonidae may be active for only a few weeks annually as melt-water pools form on the permafrost. During that time, though, they emerge in huge numbers in some regions; a swarm may take up to 300 ml of blood per day from each animal in a caribou herd.

=== Effect of climate change ===
For a mosquito to transmit disease, there must be favorable seasonal conditions, primarily humidity, temperature, and precipitation. El Niño affects the location and number of outbreaks in East Africa, Latin America, Southeast Asia and India. Climate change impacts the seasonal factors and in turn the dispersal of mosquitoes. Climate models can use historic data to recreate past outbreaks and to predict the risk of vector-borne disease, based on an area's forecasted climate. Mosquito-borne diseases have long been most prevalent in East Africa, Latin America, Southeast Asia, and India. An emergence in Europe was observed early in the 21st century. It is predicted that by 2030, the climate of southern Great Britain will be suitable for transmission of Plasmodium vivax malaria by Anopheles mosquitoes for two months of the year, and that by 2080, the same will be true for southern Scotland. Dengue fever, too, is spreading northwards with climate change. The vector, the Asian tiger mosquito Aedes albopictus, had by 2023 established across southern Europe and as far north as much of northern France, Belgium, Holland, and both Kent and West London in England. In 2025, some specimens of Culiseta annulata were found in Kjósarhreppur in Iceland, a country that had been free of mosquitoes, although none were seen over the summer of 2026.

== Ecology ==
=== Predators and parasites ===
Mosquito larvae are among the most common animals in ponds, and they form an important food source for freshwater predators. Among the many aquatic insects that catch mosquito larvae are dragonfly and damselfly nymphs, whirligig beetles, and water striders. Vertebrate predators include fish such as catfish and the mosquitofish, amphibians including the spadefoot toad and the giant tree frog, freshwater turtles such as the red-eared slider, and birds such as ducks.

Emerging adults are consumed at the pond surface by predatory flies including Empididae and Dolichopodidae, and by spiders. Flying adults are captured by dragonflies and damselflies, by birds such as swifts and swallows, and by mammals including bats.

Mosquitoes are parasitised by hydrachnid mites, ciliates such as Glaucoma, microsporidians such as Thelania, and fungi including species of Saprolegniaceae and Entomophthoraceae.

=== Pollination ===
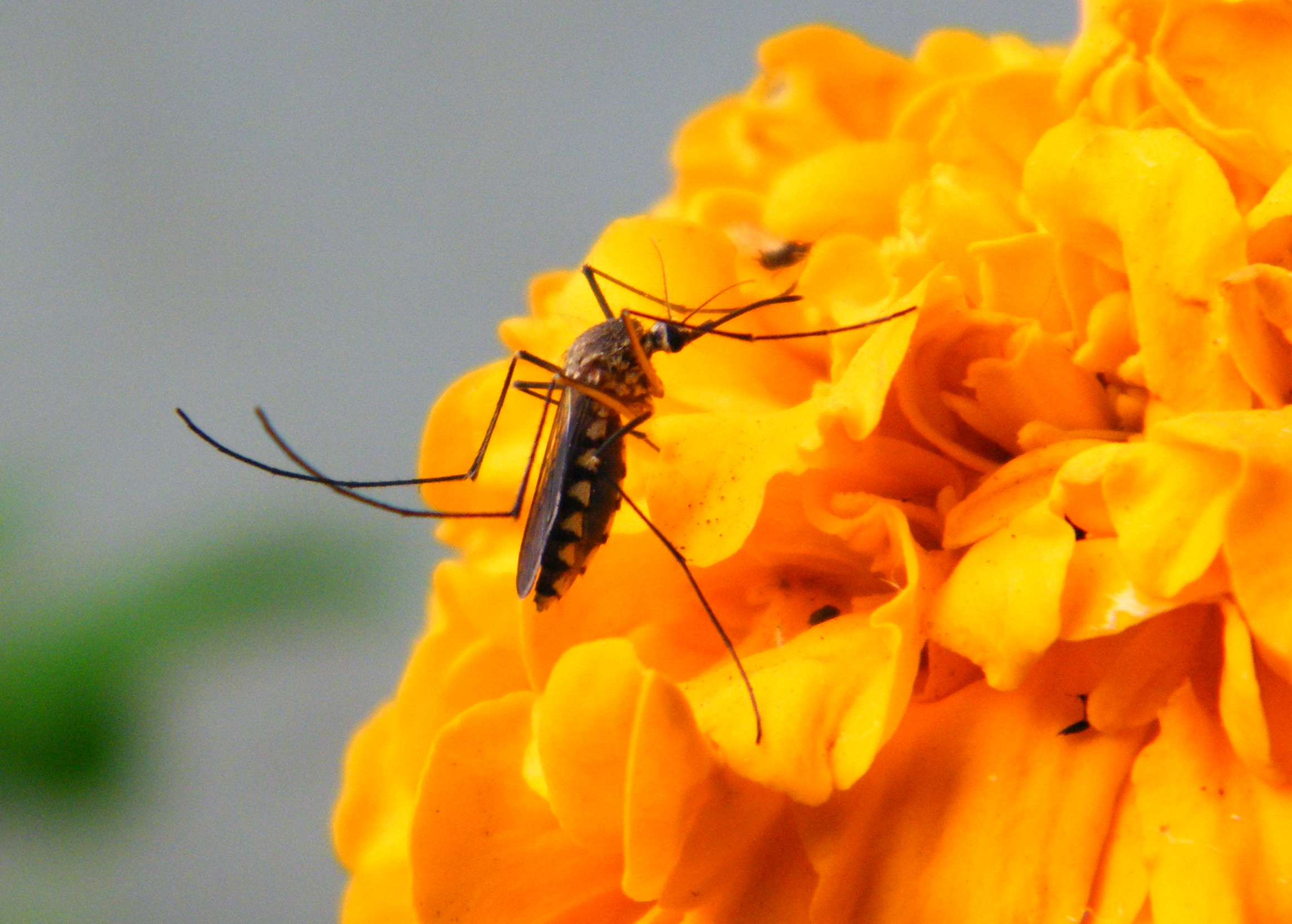
A mosquito visiting a marigold flower for nectar

Several flowers including members of the Asteraceae, Rosaceae and Orchidaceae are pollinated by mosquitoes, which visit to obtain sugar-rich nectar. A few plant associations are specialized for mosquito pollination, such as the Platanthera orchids which are pollinated by Aedes species. They are attracted to flowers by a range of semiochemicals such as alcohols, aldehydes, ketones, and terpenes. They may also use visual cues including UV reflectivity. Mosquitoes have visited and pollinated flowers since the Cretaceous period. It is possible that plant-sucking exapted mosquitoes to blood-sucking.

=== Parasitism ===
Ecologically, blood-feeding mosquitoes are micropredators, small animals that feed on larger animals without immediately killing them. Evolutionary biologists see this as a form of parasitism; in Edward O. Wilson's phrase "Parasites ... are predators that eat prey in units of less than one." Micropredation is one of six major evolutionarily stable strategies within parasitism. It is distinguished by leaving the host still able to reproduce, unlike the activity of parasitic castrators or parasitoids; and having multiple hosts, unlike conventional parasites. From this perspective, mosquitoes are ectoparasites, feeding on blood from the outside of their hosts, using their piercing mouthparts, rather than entering their bodies. Unlike some other ectoparasites such as fleas and lice, mosquitoes do not remain constantly on the body of the host, but visit only to feed.

== Evolution ==
=== Fossil record ===
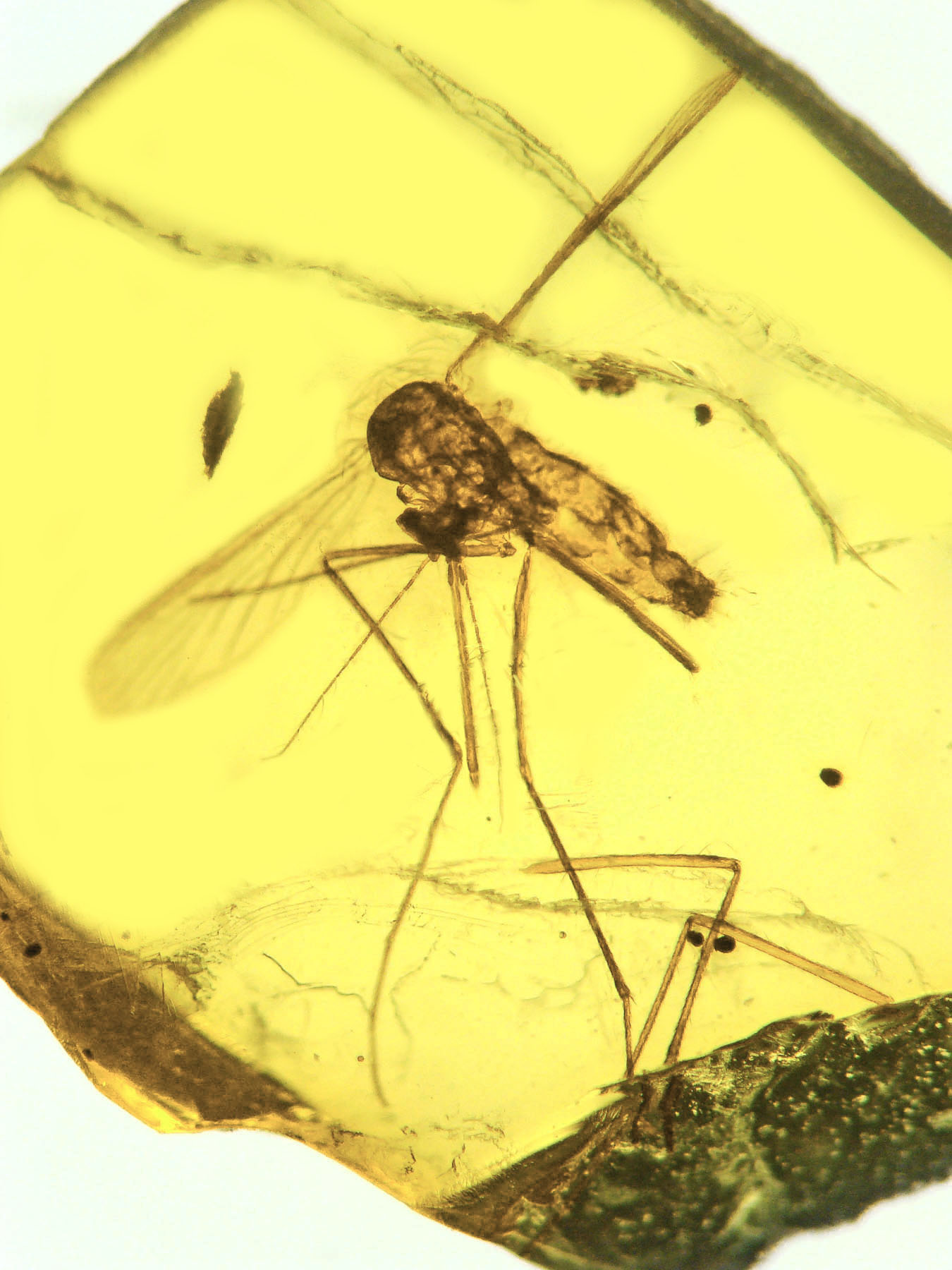
Culex malariager infected with the malarial parasite Plasmodium dominicana, in Dominican amber of Miocene age, 15–20 million years ago

A 2023 study suggested that Libanoculex intermedius found in Lebanese amber, dating to the Barremian age of the Early Cretaceous, some 125 million years ago, was the oldest known mosquito. However its identification as a mosquito is disputed: other authors consider it to be a chaoborid fly. Seven other, non-contentious species of Cretaceous mosquito are known. Burmaculex, with five recognised species, (including one formerly assigned to the separate genus Priscoculex) known from adults, and Cretosabethes primaevus known from a larva, have been found in Burmese amber from Myanmar, dating to the earliest part of the Cenomanian, some 99 million years ago. Paleoculicis minutus is known from Canadian amber from Alberta, Canada, which dates to the Campanian age of the Late Cretaceous, around 79 million years ago. Burmaculex and Paleoculicis have been interpreted as a member of the extinct subfamily Burmaculicinae that split off before the common ancestors of the two major modern subfamilies Anophelinae and Culicinae diverged, while Cretosabethes has been interpreted as a member of the modern Culicinae tribe Sabethini, implying that the diversification of mosquitoes had already considerably progressed prior to the mid-Cretaceous, despite the sparse fossil record of the group. It has been suggested based on molecular clock dating that mosquitoes originated in the Jurassic, but that major diversification did not take place until the Cretaceous.

=== Taxonomy ===
There are over 3,700 species of mosquitoes; 112 genera have been described. They are traditionally divided into two subfamilies, the Anophelinae and the Culicinae, which carry different diseases. Roughly speaking, protozoal diseases like malaria are transmitted by anophelines, while viral diseases such as yellow fever and dengue fever are transmitted by culicines.

The name Culicidae was introduced by the German entomologist Johann Wilhelm Meigen in his seven-volume classification published in 1818–1838. Mosquito taxonomy was advanced in 1901 when the English entomologist Frederick Vincent Theobald published his five-volume monograph on the Culicidae. He had been provided with mosquito specimens sent to the British Museum (Natural History) from around the world, on the 1898 instruction of the Secretary of State for the Colonies, Joseph Chamberlain, who had written that "in view of the possible connection of Malaria with mosquitoes, it is desirable to obtain exact knowledge of the different species of mosquitoes and allied insects in the various tropical colonies. I will therefore ask you ... to have collections made of the winged insects in the Colony which bite men or animals."

=== Phylogeny ===
==== External ====
Mosquitoes are members of a family of the true flies (order Diptera): the Culicidae (from the Latin culex, genitive culicis, meaning "midge" or "gnat"). They are members of the infraorder Culicomorpha and superfamily Culicoidea. The phylogenetic tree is based on the FLYTREE project.

- Diptera (true flies)
  - - Ptychopteromorpha (phantom and primitive crane-flies)
    - Culicomorpha
      - Chironomidae (non-biting midges)
      - - Simulioidea (blackflies and biting midges)
        - Culicoidea
          - Dixidae (meniscus midges)
          - - Corethrellidae (frog-biting midges)
            - - Chaoboridae (phantom midges)
              - Culicidae
  - - other midges and gnats
    - all other flies, inc. Brachycera

==== Internal ====
The two subfamilies of mosquitoes are Anophelinae, containing three genera and approximately 430 species, and Culicinae, which contains 11 tribes, 108 genera and 3,046 species. Kyanne Reidenbach and colleagues analysed mosquito phylogenetics in 2009, using both nuclear DNA and morphology of 26 species. They note that Anophelinae is confirmed to be rather basal, but that the deeper parts of the tree are not well resolved.

- Culicidae
  - basal spp.
  - - Anophelinae
    - Culicinae
      - other spp.
      - - Aedini
        - - other spp.
          - Sabethini

== Interactions with humans ==
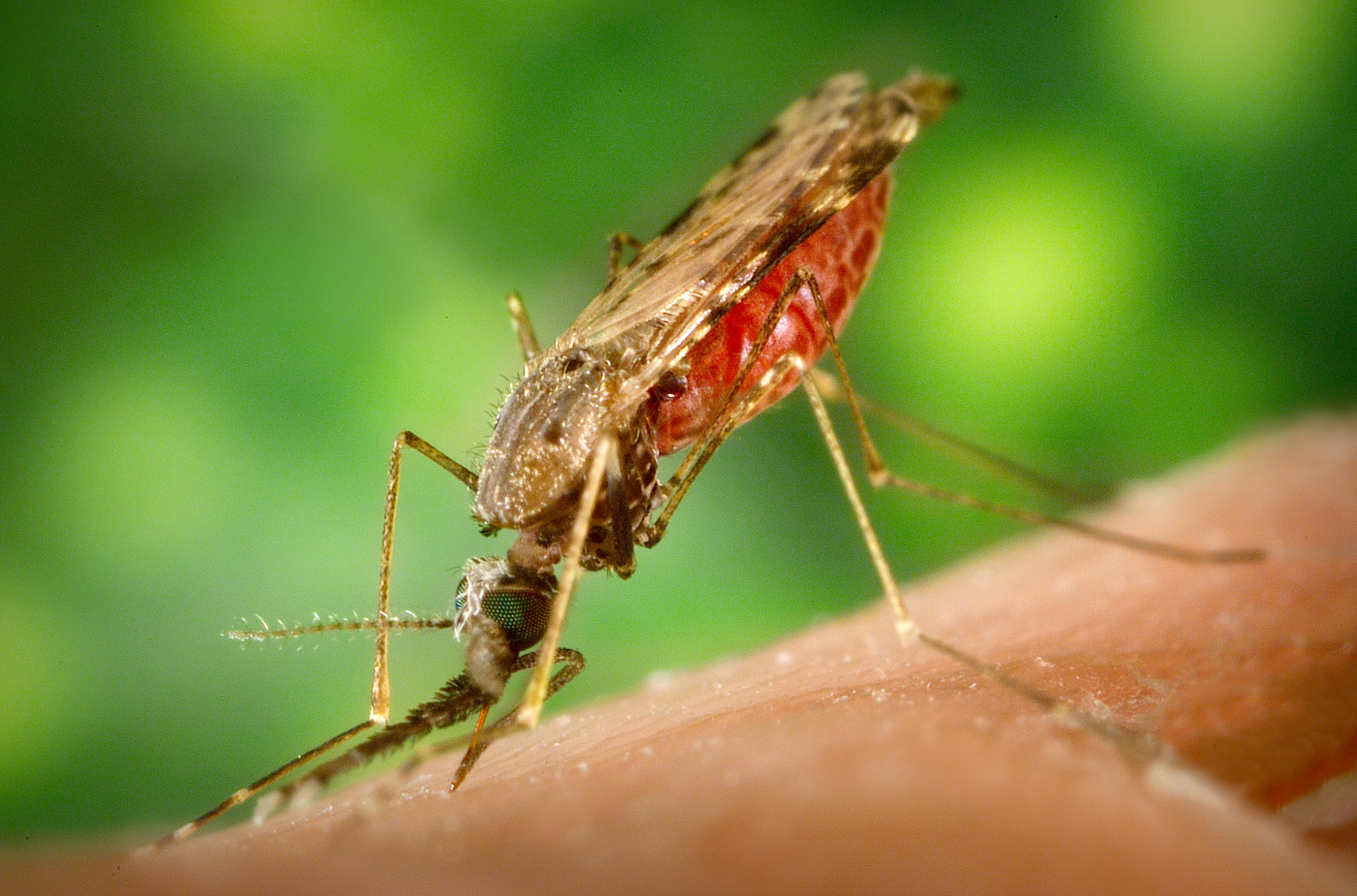
Anopheles albimanus feeding on a human arm. As mosquitoes are the only vectors of malaria, controlling them reduces its incidence.

=== Vectors of disease ===
Mosquitoes are vectors for many disease-causing microorganisms including bacteria, viruses, and protozoan parasites. Nearly 700 million people acquire a mosquito-borne illness each year, resulting in over one million deaths. Common mosquito-borne viral diseases include yellow fever, chikungunya and dengue fever, all transmitted mostly by Aedes aegypti. Parasitic diseases transmitted by mosquitoes include malaria and lymphatic filariasis. The Plasmodium parasites that cause malaria are carried by female Anopheles mosquitoes. The saglin protein in the Anopheles's salivary glands allows the malarial parasite to colonize in the mosquito. Lymphatic filariasis, the main cause of elephantiasis, is spread by a wide variety of mosquitoes. A bacterial disease spread by Culex and Culiseta mosquitoes is tularemia.

=== Control ===
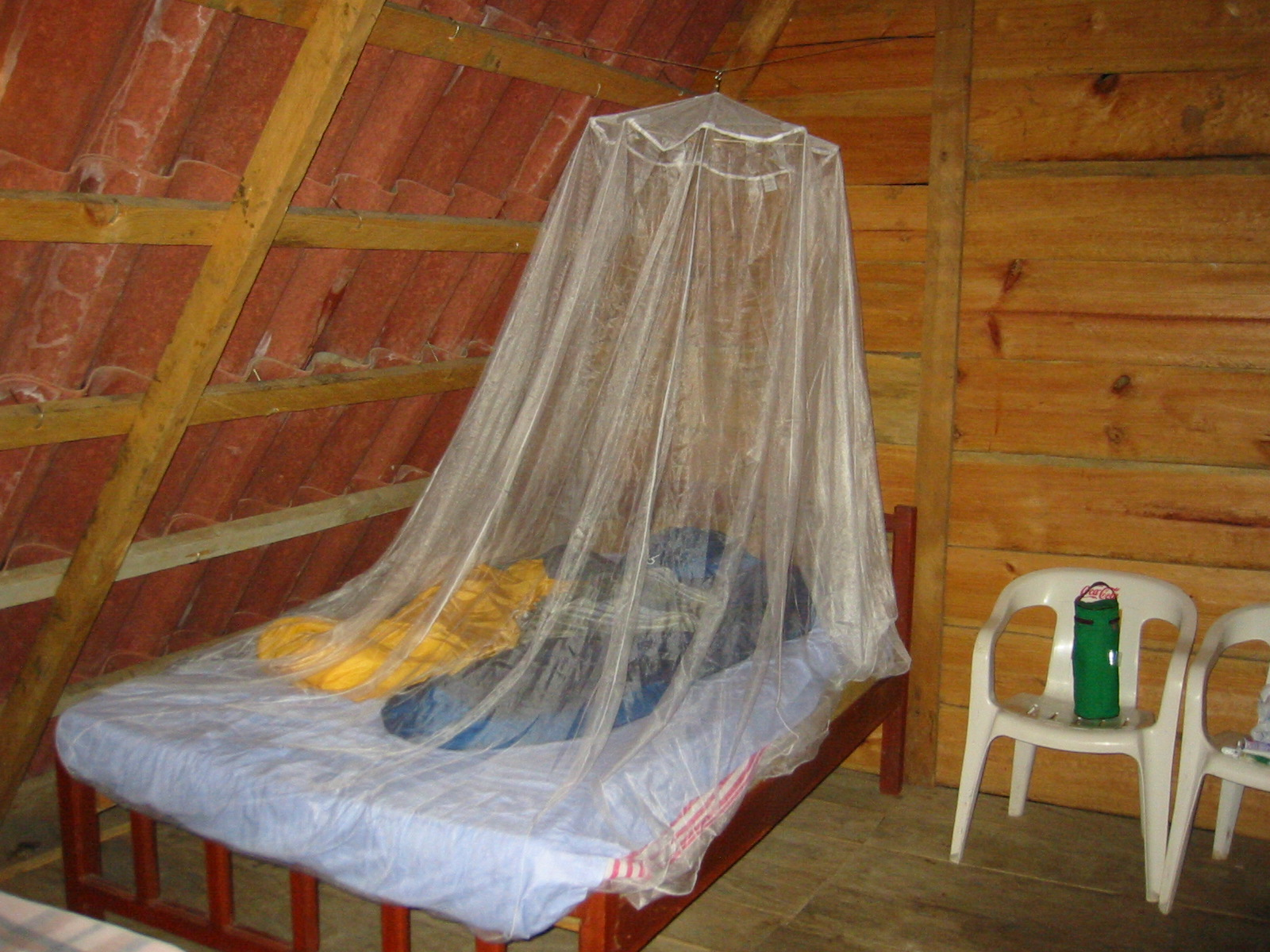
Mosquito nets can prevent people being bitten while they sleep.

Many measures have been tried for mosquito control, including the elimination of breeding places, exclusion via window screens and mosquito nets, biological control with parasites such as fungi and nematodes, or predators such as fish, copepods, dragonfly nymphs and adults, and some species of lizard and gecko. Another approach is to introduce large numbers of sterile males. Genetic modification methods including cytoplasmic incompatibility, chromosomal translocations, sex distortion and gene replacement, solutions seen as inexpensive and not subject to vector resistance, have been explored. Control of disease-carrying mosquitoes using gene drives has been proposed.

=== Repellents ===
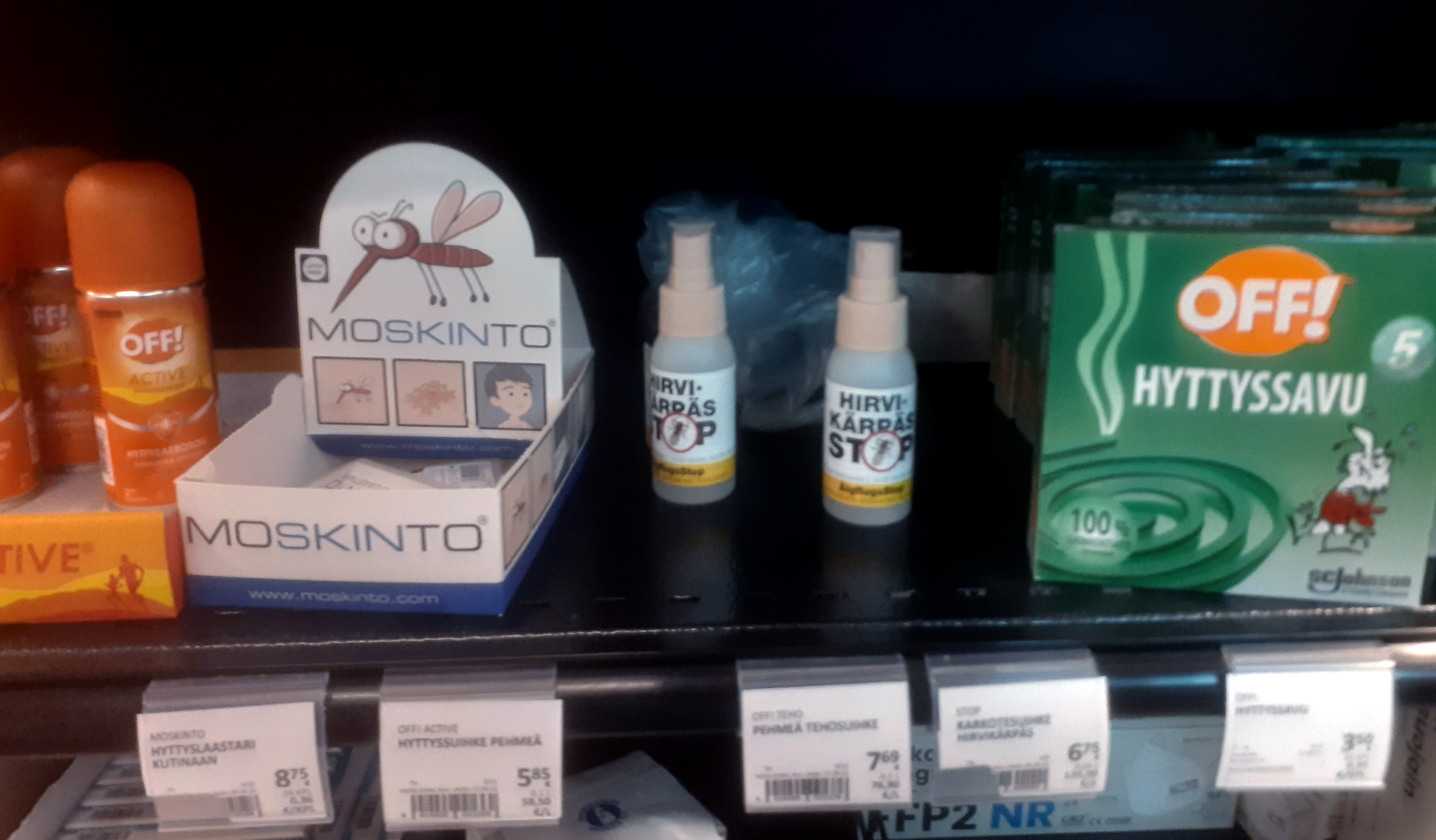
Mosquito repellents (including a mosquito coil) in a Finnish store

Insect repellents are applied on skin and give short-term protection against mosquito bites. The chemical DEET repels some mosquitoes and other insects. Some CDC-recommended repellents are picaridin, eucalyptus oil (PMD), and ethyl butylacetylaminopropionate (IR3535). Pyrethrum (from Chrysanthemum species, particularly C. cinerariifolium and C. coccineum) is an effective plant-based repellent. Electronic insect repellent devices that produce ultrasounds intended to keep away insects (and mosquitoes) are marketed. No EPA or university study has shown that these devices prevent humans from being bitten by a mosquito.

=== Bites ===
Mosquito bites lead to a variety of skin reactions and more seriously to mosquito bite allergies. Such hypersensitivity to mosquito bites is an excessive reaction to mosquito saliva proteins. Numerous species of mosquito can trigger such reactions, including Aedes aegypti, A. vexans, A. albopictus, Anopheles sinensis, Culex pipiens, Aedes communis, Anopheles stephensi, C. quinquefasciatus, C. tritaeniorhynchus, and Ochlerotatus triseriatus. Cross-reactivity between salivary proteins of different mosquitoes implies that allergic responses may be caused by virtually any mosquito species. Treatment can be with anti-itch medications, including some taken orally, such as diphenhydramine, or applied to the skin like antihistamines or corticosteroids such as hydrocortisone. Aqueous ammonia (3.6%) also provides relief. Both topical heat and cold may be useful as treatments.

== In human culture ==
=== Greek mythology ===
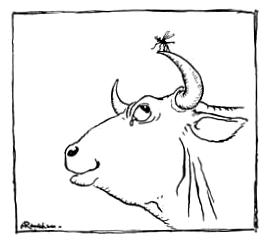
Arthur Rackham's illustration of the fable of "The Bull and the Mosquito", 1912

Ancient Greek beast fables including "The Elephant and the Mosquito" and "The Bull and the Mosquito", with the general moral that the large beast does not even notice the small one, derive ultimately from Mesopotamia.

=== Origin myths ===
The peoples of Siberia have origin myths surrounding the mosquito. One Ostiak myth tells of a man-eating giant, Punegusse, who is killed by a hero but will not stay dead. The hero eventually burns the giant, but the ashes of the fire become mosquitoes that continue to plague mankind. Other myths from the Yakuts, Goldes (Nanai people), and Samoyed have the insect arising from the ashes or fragments of some giant creature or demon. Similar tales found in Native North American myth, with the mosquito arising from the ashes of a man-eater, suggest a common origin. The Tatars of the Altai had a variant of the same myth, involving the fragments of the dead giant, Andalma-Muus, becoming mosquitoes and other insects.

Lafcadio Hearn tells that in Japan, mosquitoes are seen as reincarnations of the dead, condemned by the errors of their former lives to the condition of Jiki-ketsu-gaki, or "blood-drinking pretas".

=== Modern era ===
How a Mosquito Operates (1912)

Winsor McCay's 1912 film How a Mosquito Operates was one of the earliest works of animation. It has been described as far ahead of its time in technical quality. It depicts a giant mosquito tormenting a sleeping man.

Twelve ships of the Royal Navy have borne the name HMS Mosquito or the archaic form of the name, HMS Musquito.

The de Havilland Mosquito was a high-speed aircraft manufactured between 1940 and 1950, and used in many roles.

The Russian city of Berezniki celebrates its mosquitoes with a "most delicious girl" competition, held annually from 17–20 July. In the competition, women stand for 20 minutes in their shorts and undershirts; the girl who receives the most bites wins.

Mosquito proboscis-inspired needles are being applied in biomimetic design for use in medicine.
