= 407th =

407th may refer to:

- 407th Air Expeditionary Group, provisional United States Air Force unit assigned to the United States Air Forces Central 321st Air Expeditionary Wing
- 407th Air Refueling Squadron, inactive United States Air Force unit
- 407th Brigade Support Battalion, support battalion of the United States Army
- 407th Military Hospital (Ukraine), military hospital of the Ukrainian Armed Forces in Chernihiv
- 407th Support Brigade (United States), support brigade of the United States Army

== See also ==
- 407 (number)
- 407, the year 407 (CDVII) of the Julian calendar
- 407 BC
