= Saglin =

Protein produced by mosquitoes

Saglin is a protein produced by the salivary glands of mosquitoes. It is thought that this protein allows the malarial sporozoite to bind to the salivary glands, allowing invasion. It is currently under investigation as a potential drug target to help control transmission of the disease by controlling transmission in the vector.
