= Poloxamer =

Polyoxyethylene-polyoxypropylene block co-polymer

General structure with a = 2–130 and b = 15–67

Poloxamers are nonionic triblock copolymers composed of a central hydrophobic chain of polyoxypropylene (poly(propylene oxide)) flanked by two hydrophilic chains of polyoxyethylene (poly(ethylene oxide)). The word poloxamer was coined by BASF inventor Irving Schmolka, who received the patent for these materials in 1973. Poloxamers are also known by the trade names Pluronic, Kolliphor (pharma grade), and Synperonic.

Because the lengths of the polymer blocks can be customized, many different poloxamers exist that have slightly different properties. For the generic term poloxamer, these copolymers are commonly named with the letter P (for poloxamer) followed by three digits: the first two digits multiplied by 100 give the approximate molecular mass of the polyoxypropylene core, and the last digit multiplied by 10 gives the percentage polyoxyethylene content (e.g. P407 = poloxamer with a polyoxypropylene molecular mass of 4000 g/mol and a 70% polyoxyethylene content). For the Pluronic and Synperonic tradenames, coding of these copolymers starts with a letter to define its physical form at room temperature (L = liquid, P = paste, F = flake (solid)) followed by two or three digits, The first digit (two digits in a three-digit number) in the numerical designation, multiplied by 300, indicates the approximate molecular weight of the hydrophobe; and the last digit x 10 gives the percentage polyoxyethylene content (e.g., L61 indicates a polyoxypropylene molecular mass of 1800 g/mol and a 10% polyoxyethylene content). In the example given, poloxamer 181 (P181) = Pluronic L61 and Synperonic PE/L 61.

== Common poloxamer properties ==
Polaxamer	Formula	MW (Da)	HLB	Source
L31	PEO_{2}PPO_{16}PEO_{2}	1100	1-7	
L61	PEO_{2}PPO_{30}PEO_{2}	2000	3	
L81	PEO_{3}PPO_{43}PEO_{3}	2750	2	
L101	PEO_{4}PPO_{59}PEO_{4}	3800	1	
L121	PEO_{5}PPO_{68}PEO_{5}	4400	1	
L42	-	1630	7-12	
L62	PEO_{8}PPO_{30}PEO_{8}	2500	1-7	
L72	-	2750	1-7	
L92	PEO_{14}PPO_{50}PEO_{14}	3650	-	
L122	-	5000	1-7	
L43	-	1850	7-12	
L63	-	2650	7-12	
P103	PEO_{17}PPO_{60}PEO_{17}	4950	7-12	
P123	PEO_{20}PPO_{69}PEO_{20}	5750	7-12	
L44	-	2200	12-18	
L64	PEO_{13}PPO_{30}PEO_{13}	2900	12-18	
P84	PEO_{19}PPO_{43}PEO_{19}	4200	12-18	
P104	PEO_{27}PPO_{61}PEO_{27}	5900	12-18	
L35	PEO_{11}PPO_{16}PEO_{11}	1900	18-23	
P65	PEO_{18}PPO_{25}PEO_{18}	3400	12-18	
P75	-	4150	12-18	
P85	PEO_{26}PPO_{40}PEO_{26}	4600	12-18	
P105	PEO_{37}PPO_{56}PEO_{37}	6500	12-18	
F77	-	6600	>24	
F87	PEO_{61}PPO_{40}PEO_{61}	7700	>24	
F127	PEO_{100}PPO_{65}PEO_{100}	12600	18-23	
F38	PEO_{42}PPO_{16}PEO_{42}	4700	>24	
F68	PEO_{76}PPO_{29}PEO_{76}	8400	>24	
F88	PEO_{103}PPO_{39}PEO_{103}	11400	>24	
F98	PEO_{118}PPO_{45}PEO_{118}	13000	>24	
F108	PEO_{132}PPO_{50}PEO_{132}	14600	>24	

== Micellization and phase transitions ==
An important characteristic of poloxamer solutions is their temperature dependent self-assembling and thermo-gelling behavior. Concentrated aqueous solutions of poloxamers are liquid at low temperature and form a gel at higher temperature in a reversible process. The transitions that occur in these systems depend on the polymer composition (molecular weight and hydrophilic/hydrophobic molar ratio).

At low temperatures and concentrations (below the critical micelle temperature and critical micelle concentration) individual block copolymers (unimers) are present in solution. Above these values, aggregation of individual unimers occurs in a process called micellization. This aggregation is driven by the dehydration of the hydrophobic polyoxypropylene block that becomes progressively less soluble as the polymer concentration or temperature increases. The aggregation of several unimers occurs to minimize the interactions of the PPO blocks with the solvent. Thus, the core of the aggregates is made from the insoluble blocks (polyoxypropylene) while the soluble portion (polyoxyethylene) forms the shell of the micelles.

The mechanisms on the micellization at equilibrium have shown to depend on two relaxation times: (1) the first and fastest (tens of the microseconds scale) corresponds to the unimers exchange between micelles and the bulk solution and follows the Aniansson-Wall model (step-by-step insertion and expulsion of single polymer chains), and (2) the second and much slower one (in the millisecond range) is attributed to the formation and breakdown of whole micellar units leading to the final micellar size equilibration.

Besides spherical micelles, elongated or worm-like micelles can also be formed. The final geometry will depend on the entropy costs of stretching the blocks, which is directly related to their composition (size and polyoxypropylene/polyoxyethylene ratio). The mechanisms involved in the shape transformation are different compared to the dynamics of micellization. Two mechanisms were proposed for the sphere-to-rod transitions of block copolymer micelles, in which the micellar growth can occur by (A) fusion/fragmentation of micelles or (B) concomitant fusion/fragmentation of micelles and unimer exchange, followed by smoothing of the rod-like structures.

With higher increments of the temperature and/or concentration, other phenomena can occur such as the formation of highly ordered mesophases (cubic, hexagonal and lamellar). Eventually, a complete dehydration of the polyoxypropylene blocks and the collapse of the polyoxyethylene chains will lead to clouding and/or macroscopic phase separation. This is due to the fact that hydrogen bonding between the polyoxyethylene and the water molecules breaks down at high temperature and polyoxyethylene becomes also insoluble in water.

The phase transitions can also be largely influenced by the use of additives such as salts and alcohols. The interactions with salts are related to their ability to act as water structure makers (salting-out) or water structure breakers (salting-in). Salting-out salts increase the self-hydration of water through hydrogen bonding and reduce the hydration of the copolymers, thus reducing the critical micelle temperature and critical micelle concentration. Salting-in electrolytes reduce the water self-hydration and increase the polymer hydration, therefore increasing the critical micelle temperature and critical micelle concentration. The different salts have been categorized by the Hofmeister series according to their ‘salting-out’ power. Different phase diagrams characterizing all these transitions have been constructed for most poloxamers using a great variety of experimental techniques (e.g. SAXS, Differential scanning calorimetry, viscosity measurements, light scattering).

== Uses ==
Because of their amphiphilic structures, the polymers have surfactant properties that make them useful in industrial applications. Among other things, they can be used to increase the water solubility of hydrophobic, oily substances or otherwise increase the miscibility of two substances with different hydrophobicities. For this reason, these polymers are commonly used in industrial applications, cosmetics, and pharmaceuticals. They have also been evaluated for various drug delivery applications and were shown to sensitize drug-resistant cancers to chemotherapy.

In bioprocess applications, poloxamers are used in cell culture media for their cell cushioning effects because their addition leads to less stressful shear conditions for cells in reactors. There are grades of poloxamers commercially available specifically for cell culture, including Kolliphor P 188 Bio.

In materials science, the poloxamer P123 has recently been used in the synthesis of mesoporous materials, including SBA-15.

In colloidal science, certain poloxamers such as Pluronic F-108 or Pluronic F-127, are used as steric stabilizers to prevent coalescence and/or reduce aggregation. In the case of hydrophobic colloids, the poloxamer's interior hydrophobic block is absorbed into the colloid while the two hydrophilic tails remain suspended in solution, creating a steric barrier.

When mixed with water, concentrated solutions of poloxamers can form hydrogels. These gels can be extruded easily, acting as a carrier for other particles, and used for robocasting.

== Biological effect ==
Work led by Kabanov has recently shown that some of these polymers, originally thought to be inert carrier molecules, have a very real effect on biological systems independently of the drug they are transporting. The poloxamers have been shown to incorporate into cellular membranes affecting the microviscosity of the membranes. The polymers seem to have the greatest effect when absorbed by the cell as an unimer rather than as a micelle.

=== On multi drug resistant cancer cells ===
Poloxamers have been shown to preferentially target cancer cells, due to differences in the membrane of these cells when compared to noncancer cells. Poloxamers have also been shown to inhibit MDR proteins and other drug efflux transporters on the surface of cancer cells; the MDR proteins are responsible for the efflux of drugs from the cells and hence increase the susceptibility of cancer cells to chemotherapeutic agents such as doxorubicin.

Another effect of the polymers upon cancer cells is the inhibition of the production of ATP in multi-drug resistant (MDR) cancer cells. The polymers seem to inhibit respiratory proteins I and IV, and the effect on respiration seems to be selective for MDR cancer cells, which may be explained by the difference in fuel sources between MDR and sensitive cells (fatty acids and glucose respectively).

The poloxamers have also been shown to enhance proto-apoptotic signaling, decrease anti-apoptoic defense in MDR cells, inhibit the glutathione/glutathione S-transferase detoxification system, induce the release of cytochrome C, increase reactive oxygen species in the cytoplasm, and abolish drug sequestering within cytoplasmic vesicles.

=== On nuclear factor kappa B ===
Certain poloxamers such as P85 have been shown not only to be able to transport target genes to target cells, but also to increase gene expression. Certain poloxamers, such as P85 and L61, have also been shown to stimulate transcription of NF kappaB genes, although the mechanism by which this is achieved is currently unknown, bar that P85 has been shown to induce phosphorylation of the inhibitory kappa.

=== Potential degradation by sonication ===
Wang et al. reported that aqueous solutions of poloxamer 188 (Pluronic F-68) and poloxamer 407 (Pluronic F-127) sonicated in the presence or absence of multi-walled carbon nanotubes (MWNTs) can become highly toxic to cultured cells. Moreover, toxicity correlated with the sonolytic degradation of the polymers.
