= Sulcatone =

Names
- Preferred IUPAC name 6-Methylhept-5-en-2-one
- Other names 2-Methylheptenone; 2-Methyl-2-hepten-6-one; Methyl hexenyl ketone

Identifiers
CAS Number	110-93-0
3D model (JSmol)	Interactive image
Beilstein Reference	1741705
ChEBI	CHEBI:16310
ChEMBL	ChEMBL46340
ChemSpider	9478
ECHA InfoCard	100.003.470
EC Number	203-816-7
KEGG	C07287
PubChem CID	9862
UNII	448353S93V
CompTox Dashboard (EPA)	DTXSID5021629
- InChI: InChI=1S/C8H14O/c1-7(2)5-4-6-8(3)9/h5H,4,6H2,1-3H3 Key: UHEPJGULSIKKTP-UHFFFAOYSA-N
- SMILES: CC(=CCCC(=O)C)C

Properties
Chemical formula	C_{8}H_{14}O
Molar mass	126.199 g·mol^{−1}
Odor	Powerful, fatty, green, citrus odor
Density	0.8546 g/mL
Melting point	−67.1 °C (−88.8 °F; 206.1 K)
Boiling point	173.5 °C (344.3 °F; 446.6 K)
- Except where otherwise noted, data are given for materials in their standard state (at 25 °C [77 °F], 100 kPa). Infobox references

Sulcatone (6-methyl-5-hepten-2-one) is an unsaturated methylated ketone with the molecular formula C_{8}H_{14}O. It is a colorless, water-like liquid with a citrus-like, fruity odor.

Sulcatone is one of a number of mosquito attractants, especially for those species such as Aedes aegypti with the odor receptor gene Or4.
