= 407th Army Field Support Brigade =

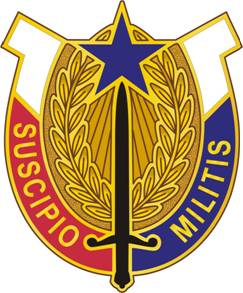
- Active: March 2005 - present
- Country: United States
- Allegiance: United States Army
- Type: Support brigade
- Role: Support
- Size: Brigade
- Garrison/HQ: Ft. Cavazos, Texas
- Motto: Suscipio Militis (Support the Soldiers)

Commanders
- Current commander: Col. Stacy L. Moore-Callaway
- Command Sergeant Major: CSM Chesa S. Freeman

Insignia
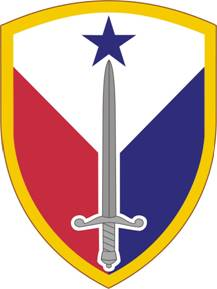
- Identification symbol: Former Unit SSI 2007-2010

- Identification symbol: Current SSI United States Army Materiel Command

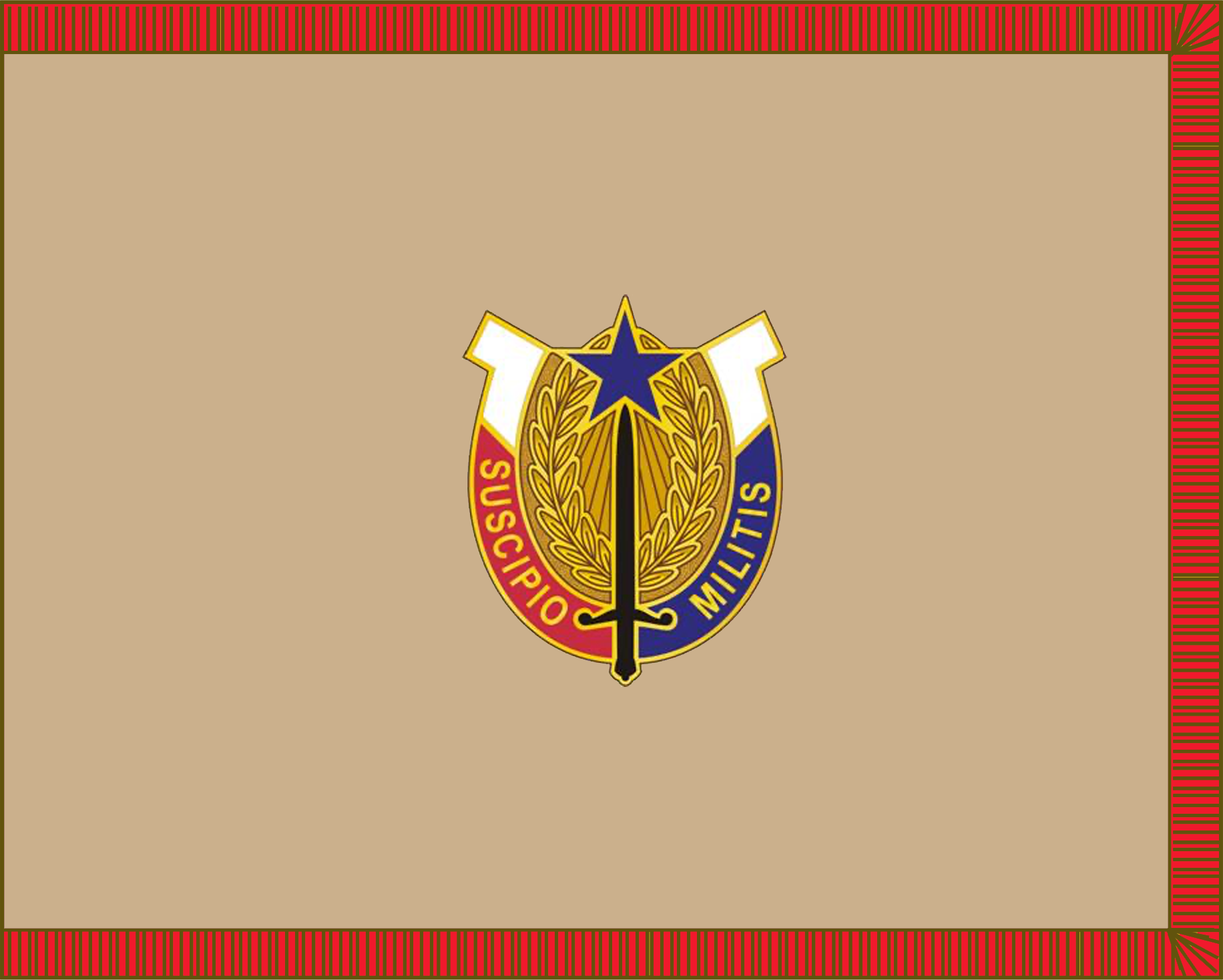
- 407th Army Support Brigade Flag

The 407th Army Field Support Brigade (AFSB) is a support brigade of the United States Army. The Brigade was originally activated at Ft. Carson, Colorado in March 2005 as Army Field Support Brigade CONUS-West (AFSB-CW). The unit moved to Fort Hood, Texas in October 2007. The Brigade provided support after hurricanes Katrina and Rita, as well as the 2010 Haiti earthquake.

== Organization ==
- 407th Army Field Support Brigade, at Fort Hood (TX)
  - Army Field Support Battalion-Bliss, at Fort Bliss (TX)
  - Army Field Support Battalion-Carson, at Fort Carson (CO)
  - Army Field Support Battalion-Hood, at Fort Hood (TX)
  - Army Field Support Battalion-Riley, at Fort Riley (KS)

== Insignia ==
The Distinctive Unit Insignia is a gold metal pin in the style of a white, red and blue horseshoe containing the motto "Suscipio Militis" (support the soldiers). Inside the opening of the horseshoe is a gold wreath with rays leading to a blue star; under the star is a black sword.

== Former Commanders ==
From	To	Commander
2006	2008	COL Mario Coronel
2008	2010	COL Rebecca W. Jones
2010	2012	COL Danny F. Tilzey
2012	2014	COL Steven L. Allen
2014	2016	COL Steven S. Debusk
2016	2018	COL Eric P. Shirley
2018	2020	COL Scott P. Noon
2020	2022	COL Carl E. Mason
2022	2024	COL Jennifer S. Karim
2024	present	COL Stacy L. Moore-Callaway
