= Poloxamer 407 =

Copolymer

- Skeleton formula of poloxameres, where poloxamer 407 has block lengths of a = 101 and b = 56

Names
- IUPAC name Oxirane, methyl-, polymer with oxirane
- Other names: Pluronic F-127; Synperonic PE/F-127; Kolliphor P 407; Poloxalene

Identifiers
CAS Number	9003-11-6
DrugBank	DB11252
PubChem CID	347911166
UNII	TUF2IVW3M2

Properties
Chemical formula	C_{572}H_{1146}O_{259}
Molar mass	12,600 g/mol
Appearance	white powder
Melting point	53–57 °C (127–135 °F; 326–330 K)
Solubility in water	very soluble

Hazards
NFPA 704 (fire diamond)	0 1 0
Safety data sheet (SDS)	Kolliphor P 407
- Except where otherwise noted, data are given for materials in their standard state (at 25 °C [77 °F], 100 kPa). Infobox references

Poloxamer 407 is a hydrophilic non-ionic surfactant of the more general class of copolymers known as poloxamers. Poloxamer 407 is a triblock copolymer consisting of a central hydrophobic block of polypropylene glycol flanked by two hydrophilic blocks of polyethylene glycol (PEG). The approximate lengths of the two PEG blocks is 101 repeat units, while the approximate length of the propylene glycol block is 56 repeat units. This particular compound is also known by the BASF trade name Pluronic F-127 or by the Croda trade name Synperonic PE/F 127. BASF also offers a pharmaceutical grade, under trade name Kolliphor P 407.

== Uses ==
Most of the common uses of poloxamer 407 are related to its surfactant properties. For example, it is widely used in cosmetics for dissolving oily ingredients in water. It can also be found in multi-purpose contact lens cleaning solutions, where its purpose there is to help remove lipid films from the lens. It can also be found in some mouthwashes. There is research ongoing for using poloxamer 407 for aligning severed blood vessels before gluing them surgically. Poloxamer 407 can also be used for its thermogelling properties in aqueous media.

Poloxamer 407 is approved by the FDA for use as an excipient in a range of pharmaceutical dosage forms, and is listed in the Inactive Ingredient Database (IID).

Poloxamer 407 is used in bioprinting applications due to its unique phase-change properties. In a 30% solution by weight, poloxamer 407 forms a gel solid at room temperature but liquifies when chilled to 4 °C (39 °F). This allows poloxamer 407 to serve as a removable support material, particularly for creating hollow channels or cavities inside hydrogels. In this role, it is often referred to as a "sacrificial ink" or a "fugitive ink".

== Reports of adverse effects ==
It was reported in The Australian newspaper 18 November 2006 that this common ingredient in toothpaste and mouthwash can cause high cholesterol in mice. A team from the Centre for Ageing and the ANZAC Research Institute in Sydney used it as a tool to demonstrate that cells in the liver behave like a sieve. They gave a high dose (1 gram per kilogram of body weight) of poloxamer 407 to mice, which blocked 80% of the pores in liver cells that absorb lipoproteins, leading to a 10-fold increase in plasma lipid levels. However, the dose used is far higher than a person would be exposed to in toothpaste or mouthwash.

=== Potential degradation by sonication ===
Wang et al. reported that aqueous solutions of poloxamer 188 and poloxamer 407 sonicated in the presence or absence of multi-walled carbon nanotubes (MWNTs) can become highly toxic to cultured cells. The toxicity correlated with the sonolytic degradation of the polymers.
