= List of mosquito genera =

There are 112 genera of mosquitoes, containing more than 3,700 species.

Human malaria is transmitted only by females of the genus Anopheles. Of the approximately 430 Anopheles species, while over 100 are known to be able to transmit malaria to humans, only 30–40 commonly do so in nature. Mosquitoes in other genera can transmit different diseases, such as yellow fever and dengue for species in the genus Aedes. The genus Aedes has over 950 species.

Since breeding and biting habit differ considerably between species, species identification is important for control programmes.

== Subfamily Anophelinae ==
- Genus Anopheles Meigen, 1818

- Subgenus Anopheles Meigen, 1818
- Subgenus Baimaia Harbach, Rattanarithikul and Harrison, 2005
- Subgenus Cellia Theobald, 1905
- Subgenus Kerteszia Theobald, 1905
- Subgenus Lophopodomyia Antunes, 1937
- Subgenus Nyssorhynchus Blanchard, 1902

- Section Albimanus
- Section Argyritarsis
- Section Myzorhynchella

- Subgenus Stethomyia Theobald, 1902

- Genus Bironella Theobald, 1905

- Subgenus Bironella Theobald, 1905
- Subgenus Brugella Edwards, 1930
- Subgenus Neobironella Tenorio, 1977

- Genus Chagasia Cruz, 1906

== Subfamily Culicinae ==
=== Tribe Aedeomyiini ===
- Genus Aedeomyia

- Subgenus Aedeomyia
- Subgenus Lepiothauma

=== Tribe Aedini ===
- Genus Abraedes
- Genus Aedes
- Genus Alanstonea
- Genus Albuginosus

- Subgenus Armigeres
- Subgenus Leicesteria

- Genus Ayurakitia
- Genus Aztecaedes
- Genus Belkinius
- Genus Borichinda
- Genus Bothaella
- Genus Bruceharrisonius
- Genus Christophersiomyia
- Genus Collessius

- Subgenus Alloeomyia
- Subgenus Collessius

- Genus Dahliana
- Genus Danielsia
- Genus Diceromyia
- Genus Dobrotworskyius
- Genus Downsiomyia
- Genus Edwardsaedes
- Genus Eretmapodites
- Genus Finlaya
- Genus Fredwardsius
- Genus Georgecraigius

- Subgenus Georgecraigius
- Subgenus Horsfallius

- Genus Gilesius
- Genus Gymnometopa
- Genus Haemagogus

- Subgenus Conopostegus
- Subgenus Haemagogus

- Genus Halaedes
- Genus Heizmannia

- Subgenus Heizmannia
- Subgenus Mattinglyia

- Genus Himalaius
- Genus Hopkinsius

- Subgenus Hopkinsius
- Subgenus Yamada

- Genus Howardina
- Genus Huaedes
- Genus Hulecoeteomyia
- Genus Indusius
- Genus Isoaedes
- Genus Jarnellius

- Subgenus Jarnellius
- Subgenus Lewnielsenius

- Genus Jihlienius
- Genus Kenknightia
- Genus Kompia
- Genus Leptosomatomyia
- Genus Lorrainea
- Genus Luius
- Genus Macleaya

- Subgenus Chaetocruiomyia
- Subgenus Macleaya

- Genus Molpemyia
- Genus Mucidus

- Subgenus Mucidus
- Subgenus Lewnielsenius

- Genus Neomelaniconion
- Genus Ochlerotatus

- Subgenus Acartomyia
- Subgenus Buvirilia
- Subgenus Chrysoconops
- Subgenus Culicelsa
- Subgenus Empihals
- Subgenus Geoskusea
- Subgenus Gilesia
- Subgenus Levua
- Subgenus Ochlerotatus
- Subgenus Pholeomyia
- Subgenus Protoculex
- Subgenus Pseudoskusea
- Subgenus Rhinoskusea
- Subgenus Rusticoidus
- Subgenus Sallumia

- Genus Opifex

- Subgenus Nothoskusea
- Subgenus Opifex

- Genus Paraedes
- Genus Patmarksia
- Genus Phagomyia
- Genus Pseudarmigeres
- Genus Psorophora

- Subgenus Grabhamia
- Subgenus Janthinosoma
- Subgenus Psorophora

- Genus Rampamyia
- Genus Scutomyia
- Genus Skusea
- Genus Stegomyia
- Genus Tanakaius
- Genus Tewarius
- Genus Udaya
- Genus Vansomerenis
- Genus Verrallina

- Subgenus Harbachius
- Subgenus Neomacleaya
- Subgenus Verrallina

- Genus Zavortinkius
- Genus Zeugnomyia

=== Tribe Culicini ===
- Genus Culex

- Subgenus Acalleomyia
- Subgenus Acallyntrum
- Subgenus Aedinus
- Subgenus Afroculex
- Subgenus Allimanta
- Subgenus Anoedioporpa
- Subgenus Barraudius
- Subgenus Belkinomyia
- Subgenus Carrollia
- Subgenus Culex
- Subgenus Culiciomyia
- Subgenus Eumelanomyia
- Subgenus Kitzmilleria
- Subgenus Lasiosiphon
- Subgenus Lophoceraomyia
- Subgenus Maillotia
- Subgenus Melanoconion
- Subgenus Micraedes
- Subgenus Microculex
- Subgenus Neoculex
- Subgenus Nicaromyia
- Subgenus Oculeomyia
- Subgenus Phenacomyia
- Subgenus Phytotelmatomyia
- Subgenus Sirivanakarnius
- Subgenus Tinolestes

- Genus Deinocerites
- Genus Galindomyia
- Genus Lutzia

- Subgenus Insulalutzia
- Subgenus Lutzia
- Subgenus Metalutzia

=== Tribe Culisetini ===
- Genus Culiseta

- Subgenus Allotheobaldia
- Subgenus Austrotheobaldia
- Subgenus Climacura
- Subgenus Culicella
- Subgenus Culiseta
- Subgenus Neotheobaldia
- Subgenus Theomyia

=== Tribe Ficalbiini ===
- Genus Ficalbia
- Genus Mimomyia

- Subgenus Etorleptiomyia
- Subgenus Ingramia
- Subgenus Mimomyia

=== Tribe Hodgesiini ===
- Genus Hodgesia

=== Tribe Mansoniini ===
- Genus Coquillettidia

- Subgenus Austromansonia
- Subgenus Coquillettidia
- Subgenus Rhynchotaenia

- Genus Mansonia

- Subgenus Coquillettidia
- Subgenus Mansonioides

=== Tribe Orthopodomyiini ===
- Genus Orthopodomyia

=== Tribe Sabethini ===
- Genus Isostomyia
- Genus Johnbelkinia
- Genus Kimia
- Genus Limatus
- Genus Malaya
- Genus Maorigoeldia
- Genus Onirion
- Genus Runchomyia

- Subgenus Ctenogoeldia
- Subgenus Runchomyia

- Genus Sabethes

- Subgenus Davismyia
- Subgenus Peytonulus
- Subgenus Sabethes
- Subgenus Sabethinus
- Subgenus Sabethoides

- Genus Shannoniana
- Genus Topomyia

- Subgenus Suaymyia
- Subgenus Topomyia

- Genus Trichoprosopon
- Genus Tripteroides

- Subgenus Polylepidomyia
- Subgenus Rachionotomyia
- Subgenus Rachisoura
- Subgenus Tricholeptomyia
- Subgenus Tripteroides

- Genus Wyeomyia

- Subgenus Antunesmyia
- Subgenus Caenomyiella
- Subgenus Cruzmyia
- Subgenus Decamyia
- Subgenus Dendromyia
- Subgenus Dodecamyia
- Subgenus Exallomyia
- Subgenus Hystatamyia
- Subgenus Menolepis
- Subgenus Nunezia
- Subgenus Phoniomyia
- Subgenus Prosopolepis
- Subgenus Spilonympha
- Subgenus Wyeomyia
- Subgenus Zinzala

=== Tribe Toxorhynchitini ===
- Genus Toxorhynchites

- Subgenus Afrorhynchus
- Subgenus Ankylorhynchus
- Subgenus Lynchiella
- Subgenus Toxorhynchites

=== Tribe Uranotaeniini ===
- Genus Uranotaenia

- Subgenus Pseudoficalbia
- Subgenus Uranotaenia
