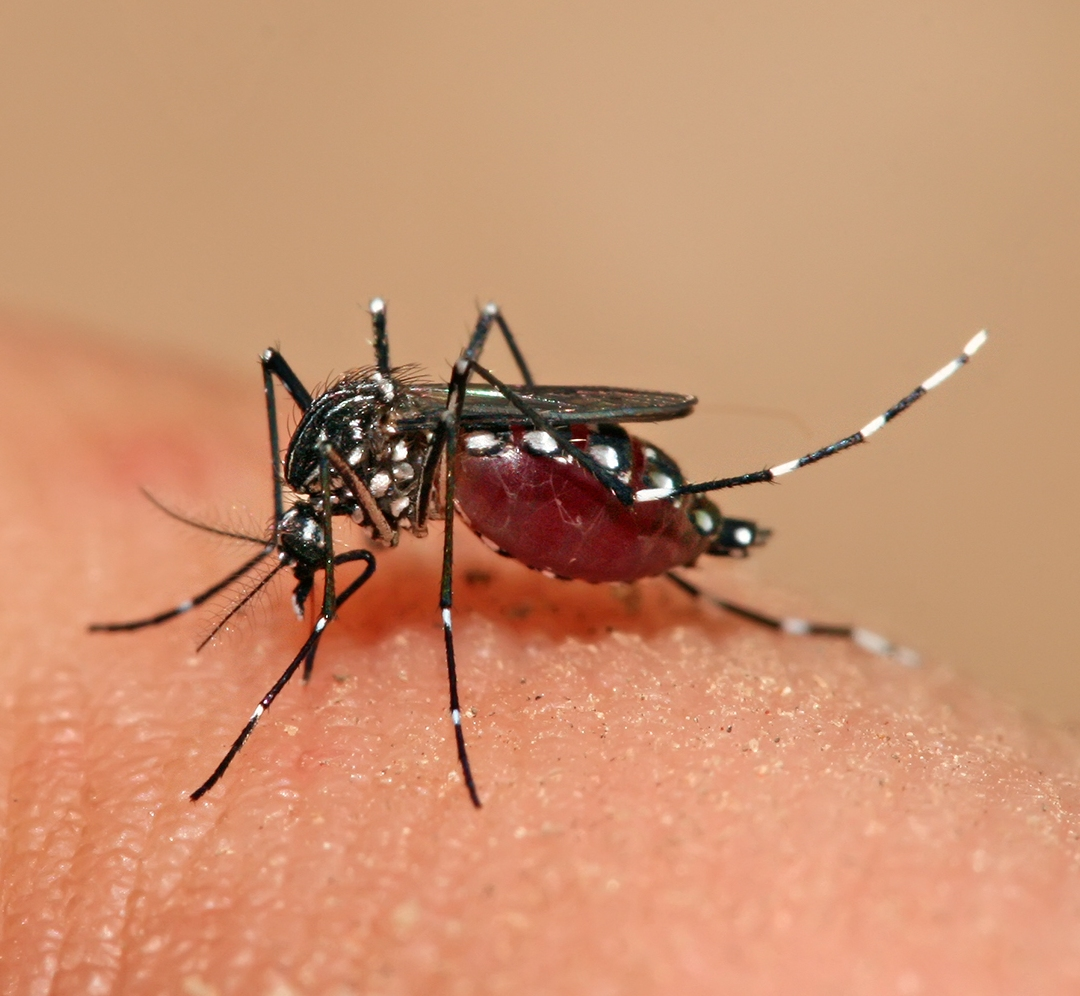
- Aedes aegypti

Scientific classification
- Kingdom: Animalia
- Phylum: Arthropoda
- Clade: Pancrustacea
- Class: Insecta
- Order: Diptera
- Family: Culicidae
- Subfamily: Culicinae
- Tribe: Aedini; Neveu-Lemaire, 1902

Type genus
- Aedes Meigen, 1818

Genera
- See text

Synonyms
- Aedeinae Neveu-Lemaire, 1902; Armigerini

= Aedini =

Tribe of flies

Aedini is a mosquito tribe in the subfamily Culicinae. It is the main tribe of mosquitoes with 1256 species classified in 81 genera and two groups incertae sedis.

== Genera ==
- Genus Abraedes
- Genus Aedes
  - Subgenus Kompia
- Genus Alanstonea
- Genus Albuginosus
- Genus Armigeres
  - Subgenus Armigeres
  - Subgenus Leicesteria
- Genus Ayurakitia
- Genus Aztecaedes
- Genus Belkinius
- Genus Borichinda
- Genus Bothaella
- Genus Bruceharrisonius
- Genus Christophersiomyia
- Genus Collessius
  - Subgenus Alloeomyia
  - Subgenus Collessius
- Genus Dahliana
- Genus Danielsia
- Genus Diceromyia
- Genus Dobrotworskyius
- Genus Downsiomyia
- Genus Edwardsaedes
- Genus Eretmapodites
- Genus Finlaya
- Genus Fredwardsius
- Genus Georgecraigius
  - Subgenus Georgecraigius
  - Subgenus Horsfallius
- Genus Gilesius
- Genus Gymnometopa
- Genus Haemagogus
  - Subgenus Conopostegus
  - Subgenus Haemagogus
- Genus Halaedes
- Genus Heizmannia
  - Subgenus Heizmannia
  - Subgenus Mattinglyia
- Genus Himalaius
- Genus Hopkinsius
  - Subgenus Hopkinsius
  - Subgenus Yamada
- Genus Howardina
- Genus Huaedes
- Genus Hulecoeteomyia
- Genus Indusius
- Genus Isoaedes
- Genus Jarnellius
  - Subgenus Jarnellius
  - Subgenus Lewnielsenius
- Genus Jihlienius
- Genus Kenknightia
- Genus Leptosomatomyia
- Genus Lorrainea
- Genus Luius
- Genus Macleaya
  - Subgenus Chaetocruiomyia
  - Subgenus Macleaya
- Genus Molpemyia
- Genus Mucidus
  - Subgenus Mucidus
  - Subgenus Lewnielsenius
- Genus Neomelaniconion
- Genus Ochlerotatus
  - Subgenus Acartomyia
  - Subgenus Buvirilia
  - Subgenus Chrysoconops
  - Subgenus Culicelsa
  - Subgenus Empihals
  - Subgenus Geoskusea
  - Subgenus Gilesia
  - Subgenus Levua
  - Subgenus Ochlerotatus
  - Subgenus Pholeomyia
  - Subgenus Protoculex
  - Subgenus Pseudoskusea
  - Subgenus Rhinoskusea
  - Subgenus Rusticoidus
  - Subgenus Sallumia
- Genus Opifex
  - Subgenus Nothoskusea
  - Subgenus Opifex
- Genus Paraedes
- Genus Patmarksia
- Genus Phagomyia
- Genus Pseudarmigeres
- Genus Psorophora
  - Subgenus Grabhamia
  - Subgenus Janthinosoma
  - Subgenus Psorophora
- Genus Rampamyia
- Genus Scutomyia
- Genus Skusea
- Genus Stegomyia
- Genus Tanakaius
- Genus Tewarius
- Genus Udaya
- Genus Vansomerenis
- Genus Verrallina
  - Subgenus Harbachius
  - Subgenus Neomacleaya
  - Subgenus Verrallina
- Genus Zavortinkius
- Genus Zeugnomyia

== See also ==
- List of mosquito genera
