= Rampa =

Rampa may refer to:

- Rampa (film), working title of Sompa, 2012 Indian Tulu-language film
- Rampa, Natal, station and transport connection in Natal, Rio Grande do Norte, Brazil
- La Rampa, street in the Vedado district of Havana, Cuba
- Lobsang Rampa (1910–1981), pen name of Cyril Henry Hoskin, British spiritual writer
- Rampa Rattanarithikul (born 1939), Thai entomologist

== See also ==
- Rampa Rebellion (disambiguation)
