= Ilhéus virus =

- Transmission electron micrograph of ILHV

Virus classification
- (unranked): Virus
- Realm: Riboviria
- Kingdom: Orthornavirae
- Phylum: Kitrinoviricota
- Class: Flasuviricetes
- Order: Amarillovirales
- Family: Flaviviridae
- Genus: Orthoflavivirus
- Subgenus: Euflavivirus
- Species: Orthoflavivirus ilheusense

Species of virus

Ilhéus virus (ILHV), commonly spelled Ilheus virus, is a positive-strand RNA virus in the family Flaviviridae. It was first isolated in 1944 from mosquitoes in the genera Psorophora and Aedes in Ilhéus in the state of Bahia, Brazil. It has subsequently been found to be widespread in much of South and Central America as well as the Caribbean.

== Vectors and transmission ==
Besides Psorophora and Aedes, Ilhéus virus has also been isolated from mosquitoes in the genera Culex, Coquillettidia, Haemagogus, Ochlerotatus, Sabethes, and Trichoprosopon. However, a study using multiple detection methods failed to indicate viral infection between 7 and 21 days post-inoculation in the mosquito Culex quinquefasciatus, suggesting this common synanthropic species may be resistant to the virus.

Ilhéus virus is traditionally thought to maintain itself through a transmission cycle between Culex mosquitoes and wild birds, but new evidence suggests Aedes mosquitoes are much more effective vectors and may play a larger role. Serological studies indicate the virus may infect many other animals: monkeys, coatis, sloths, horses, rodents, bats, and tortoises, as well as humans. Whether or not these are dead-end hosts is unclear.

== Disease ==
Ilhéus virus is the causative agent of Ilhéus fever in humans, a neglected tropical disease reported occasionally within the virus' range. The disease commonly presents as a fever associated frequently with muscle pain, headache, malaise, encephalitis, joint pain, cough, diarrhea, and sometimes other symptoms. Most symptoms are essentially indistinguishable from other febrile illnesses, which may mask the disease. The majority of cases of ILHV seropositivity have been subclinical, which facilitates widespread transmission. One fatal case of encephalitis progressing to cerebral hemorrhaging and edema associated with ILHV infection (detected by PCR assay) has been documented, but comorbidities were also present which prevent the death from being clearly attributed to Ilhéus fever.

Though Ilhéus virus has not been implicated in widespread epidemics, its close relative Rocio virus (ROCV) caused a 1976 outbreak with a 13% case fatality rate. ILHV has been shown to be capable of rapid replication in various mammalian cell cultures, and the threat of a zoonotic spillover is significant. The potential for an epidemic is thought to be high with increasing human encroachment into wild landscapes in the Neotropics.
