= Kompia =

Kompia may refer to:

- Kompyang or kompia, a Chinese bread product
- Kompia (subgenus), a subgenus of the mosquito genus Aedes
