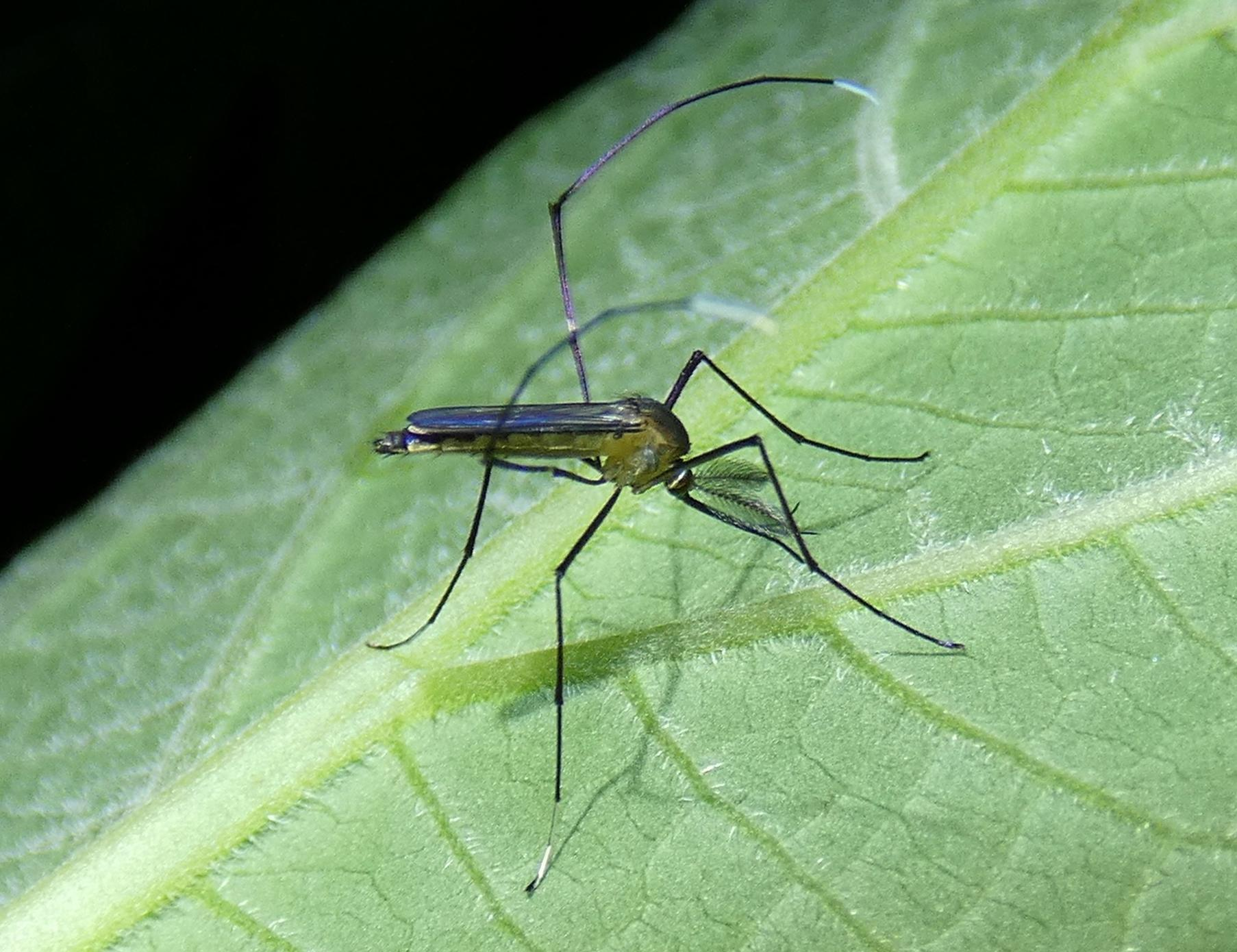
- Trichoprosopon digitatum

Scientific classification
- Kingdom: Animalia
- Phylum: Arthropoda
- Class: Insecta
- Order: Diptera
- Family: Culicidae
- Subfamily: Culicinae
- Tribe: Sabethini
- Genus: Trichoprosopon; Theobald, 1901

Type species
- Trichoprosopon nivipes Theobald, 1901 [subjective synonym of Tr. digitatum (Rondani, 1848)]

Species
- See text

= Trichoprosopon =

Genus of mosquitoes

Trichoprosopon is a genus of mosquitoes which occurs in the Neotropical region, ranging from Mexico south to Argentina. There are currently 17 described species recognized, but there is also an unknown number of undescribed species. They are a poorly understood group with a confused taxonomic history.They are sometimes referred to as hairy-lipped mosquitoes.

== Biology ==
Adult Trichoprosopon mosquitoes are diurnal and occur in forested habitats. Their larvae develop in phytotelmata, including bamboo internodes, tree holes, Heliconia bracts, in palms and bromeliads, cacao pods, and coconut husks.

Trichoprosopon is one of several mosquito genera common in fruit husks worldwide, and within their neotropical range, they are by far the most common mosquito larvae found in this habitat. The species Tr. digitatum seems to be particularly associated with cacao pods and is common on plantations of this tree. Their mandibular teeth are larger and more sclerotized than many other mosquito larvae, allowing them to feed on the decaying fruit. Predation on other culicid larvae has also been observed in the laboratory. Trichoprosopon larvae have been observed "crawling" through the viscous fluid inside decaying fruits. Remarkably, females of Tr. digitatum have been observed brooding their egg rafts from deposition until hatching, a period lasting 26–30 hours on average. This behavior is known from very few other mosquitoes (see Armigeres).

Only one species, the widespread Tr. digitatum, is considered medically significant. It is a potential vector of arboviruses, as the Pixuna, Wyeomyia, Bussuquara, Ilhéus, and St. Louis Encephalitis viruses have been isolated from this species.

== Species ==
As of 2023, the following species are recognized:

| Species | Authority | Known Distribution |
|---|---|---|
| Trichoprosopon andinum | Levi-Castillo, 1953 | Colombia, Ecuador |
| Trichoprosopon brevipes | (da Costa Lima, 1931) | Brazil |
| Trichoprosopon castroi | Lane & Cerqueira, 1942 | Argentina, Brazil, Panama |
| Trichoprosopon compressum | Lutz, 1905 | Argentina, Bolivia, Brazil, Colombia, Ecuador, French Guiana, Guyana, Panama, Paraguay, Venezuela |
| Trichoprosopon digitatum | (Rondani, 1848) | Argentina, Belize, Bolivia, Brazil, Colombia, Costa Rica, Ecuador, El Salvador, French Guiana, Guatemala, Guyana, Honduras, Mexico, Nicaragua, Panama, Paraguay, Peru, Suriname, Trinidad and Tobago, Venezuela |
| Trichoprosopon evansae | Antunes, 1942 | Colombia, Venezuela |
| Trichoprosopon lampropus | (Howard, Dyar & Knab, 1913) | Brazil, Costa Rica, Ecuador, Panama |
| Trichoprosopon lanei | (Antunes, 1937) | Colombia, Ecuador |
| Trichoprosopon mixtli | Rivera-García, Mendez-Andrade & Ibáñez-Bernal, 2023 | Mexico |
| Trichoprosopon mogilasium | (Dyar & Knab, 1907) | Brazil, Panama |
| Trichoprosopon obscurum | Lane & Cerqueira, 1942 | Argentina, Brazil |
| Trichoprosopon pallidiventer | (Lutz, 1905) | Argentina, Bolivia, Brazil, Colombia, French Guiana, Nicaragua, Panama, Paraguay, Peru, Venezuela |
| Trichoprosopon simile | Lane & Cerqueira, 1942 | Argentina, Brazil |
| Trichoprosopon soaresi | Lane & Cerqueira, 1942 | Brazil, French Guiana, (and possibly Mexico) |
| Trichoprosopon townsendi | Stone, 1944 | Brazil, Panama, Trinidad and Tobago |
| Trichoprosopon trichorryes | (Dyar & Knab, 1907) | Panama |
| Trichoprosopon vonplesseni | (Dyar & Knab, 1906) | Ecuador |
