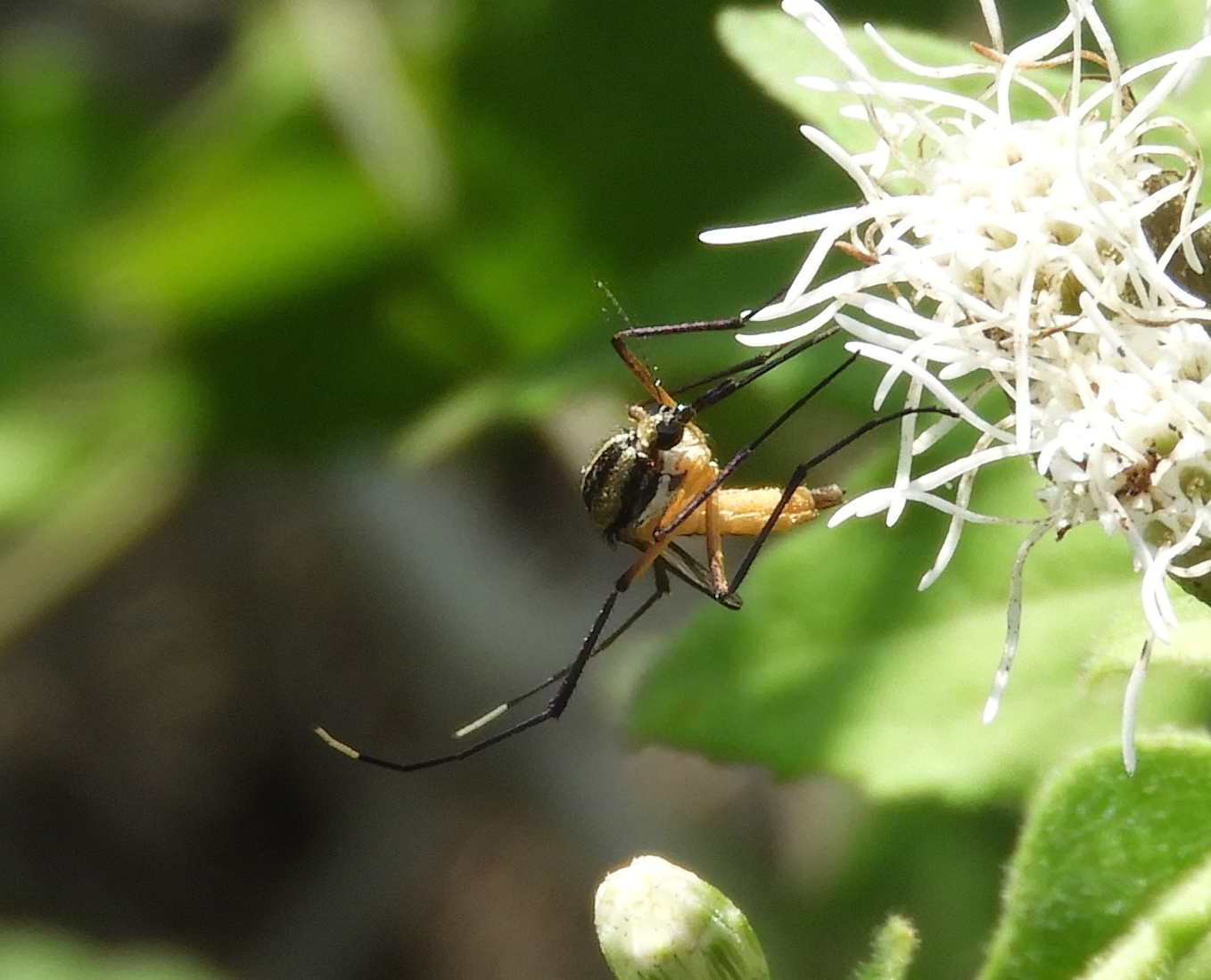

Scientific classification
- Kingdom: Animalia
- Phylum: Arthropoda
- Clade: Pancrustacea
- Class: Insecta
- Order: Diptera
- Family: Culicidae
- Genus: Psorophora
- Species: P. longipalpus

Binomial name
- Psorophora longipalpus Randolph & O'neill, 1944

Synonyms
- Psorophora longipalpis Roth, 1945

= Psorophora longipalpus =

Species of fly

Psorophora longipalpus is a species of mosquito in the family Culicidae.

== Description ==
Psorophora longipalpus is a species of mosquito belonging to the subgenus Janthinosoma.
