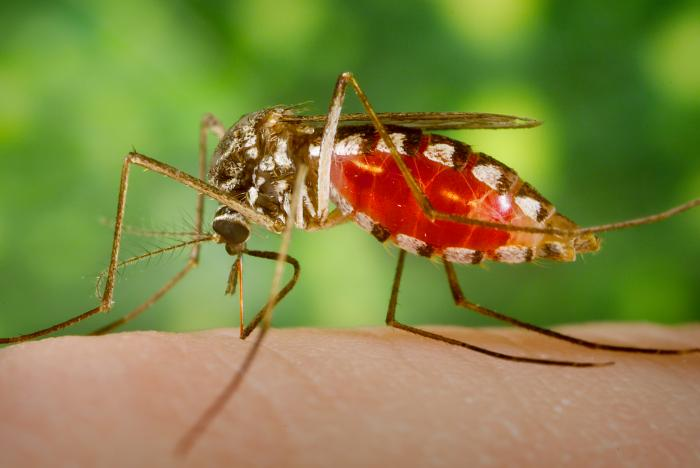

Scientific classification
- Kingdom: Animalia
- Phylum: Arthropoda
- Class: Insecta
- Order: Diptera
- Family: Culicidae
- Genus: Armigeres
- Species: A. subalbatus

Binomial name
- Armigeres subalbatus (Coquillett, 1898)

Synonyms
- Culex panalectoris Giles, 1901

= Armigeres subalbatus =

Species of fly

Armigeres (Armigeres) subalbatus is a species complex of zoophilic mosquito belonging to the genus Armigeres. It is found in Sri Lanka, India, Bangladesh, Myanmar, Pakistan, Nepal, Japan, China, Korea, Taiwan, Ryukyu-Retto, Indochina, Thailand, and Guam.

== Description ==
Larvae are carnivorous and can be found from pools with foul water, often containing a high organic content. They are well modified to live in any water clogged place for the survival, which includes natural habitats like hollow logs, rock holes, tree holes, bamboo, Pandanus axils, sago palm and banana stumps, fruit shells and husks, fallen leaves and spathes, flower bracts, pitcher plants, and artificial containers having organic matter and small collections of ground water made by humans. Adults are more confined to dark forested areas and active mostly in crepuscular periods. Females are primarily human-biters.

== Medical importance ==
It is a natural vector for filarial worms such as zoonotic Brugia pahangi, and Wuchereria bancrofti, which cause filariasis to humans.
