= Armigeres aureolineatus =

Scientific classification
- Domain: Eukaryota
- Kingdom: Animalia
- Phylum: Arthropoda
- Class: Insecta
- Order: Diptera
- Family: Culicidae
- Genus: Armigeres
- Species: A. aureolineatus

Binomial name
- Armigeres aureolineatus (Leicester, 1908)

Species of fly

Armigeres (Armigeres) aureolineatus is a species complex of zoophilic mosquito belonging to the genus Armigeres. It is found in Sri Lanka, India, Malaya, Cambodia, Laos, Nepal, Philippines, Vietnam, Thailand, Indochina, China, and Borneo. Larvae are collected from discarded containers, coconut shells and dirty water pools. It is known as a vector for avian diseases and few mammalian diseases.
