= Aedes albolineatus =

Scientific classification
- Kingdom: Animalia
- Phylum: Arthropoda
- Class: Insecta
- Order: Diptera
- Family: Culicidae
- Genus: Aedes
- Subgenus: Scutomyia
- Species: A. albolineatus

Binomial name
- Aedes albolineatus Theobald, 1940

Mosquito species

Aedes albolineatus is a species of mosquito in the genus Aedes. It was described in 1904.
