= Aedes (Alanstonea) =

Scientific classification
- Kingdom: Animalia
- Phylum: Arthropoda
- Class: Insecta
- Order: Diptera
- Family: Culicidae
- Genus: Aedes
- Subgenus: Aedes (Alanstonea); Mattingly, 1960

Subgenus of mosquito

Alanstonea is a subgenus of Aedes, a genus of mosquito in the tribe Aedini. Species are found in Southeast Asia: recorded in Brunei, Indonesia, Malaysia and Thailand.

== Characteristics ==
Adult members of Alanstonea are similar morphologically to those of Armigeres. They both have similar size and colouration, as well as a laterally compressed proboscis that curves downwards. They differ to Armigeres due to the absence of setae on the lower mesepimeron and features of the male genitalia. These differences are more obvious in immature stages.

Paddles of pupae lack a midrib and a marginal fringe, both which Armigeres have, and larvae have a narrow siphon and a pecten. Maxillary palps are slender and bare, on adult females are shorter than 0.25x the length of the proboscis, while males have longer palps than proboscis. Scales and scale patches can be used to differentiate members of this genus from those of other genera.

== Life cycle ==
Pupae, eggs, and larvae can be found in Nepenthes pitcher plants. The larvae are carnivorous, feeding on other mosquito larvae.

The eggs are 0.78 mm long and 0.2 mm broad, the end of which the larva hatches from is broader than the other. Eggs are dark, almost black. The eggs do not float on water, instead are laid separately on inner surfaces of the pitchers. They are always positioned in a ring.

== Taxonomy ==
Both species in this genus were originally put in Armigeres. Later, they were transferred to the subgenus of Aedes, Stegomyia. This did not fit them well, and they were moved to a new subgenus of Aedes.

== Species ==
- Aedes brevitibia (Edwards, 1914)
- Aedes treubi (de Meijere, 1910)
