= Armigeres magnus =

Scientific classification
- Kingdom: Animalia
- Phylum: Arthropoda
- Class: Insecta
- Order: Diptera
- Family: Culicidae
- Genus: Armigeres
- Species: A. magnus

Binomial name
- Armigeres magnus (Theobald, 1908)

Synonyms
- Brevirhynchus magnus Theobald, 1908; Stegomyia striocrura Giles, 1904

Species of fly

Armigeres (Leicesteria) magnus is a species of mosquito belonging to the subfamily Culicinae. It is widely distributed in South, Southeast, and East Asia: it is found in Sri Lanka, Bangladesh, Cambodia, Indonesia, Laos, Macau, India, Malaysia, Nepal, Philippines, Myanmar, Thailand, Vietnam, Taiwan, Indochina, China, and Sumatra. It can readily bite humans but others suggest that it is primarily zoophilic. It breeds in Nepenthes species, tree holes, and bamboo joints.
