= Armigeres omissus =

Scientific classification
- Domain: Eukaryota
- Kingdom: Animalia
- Phylum: Arthropoda
- Class: Insecta
- Order: Diptera
- Family: Culicidae
- Genus: Armigeres
- Species: A. omissus

Binomial name
- Armigeres omissus (Edwards, 1914)

Species of fly

Armigeres (Leicesteria) omissus is a species complex of zoophilic mosquito belonging to the genus Armigeres. It is found in Sri Lanka, India, Nepal, Indonesia, Malaysia, Taiwan, Thailand, Bangladesh, Philippines, Cambodia and China.
