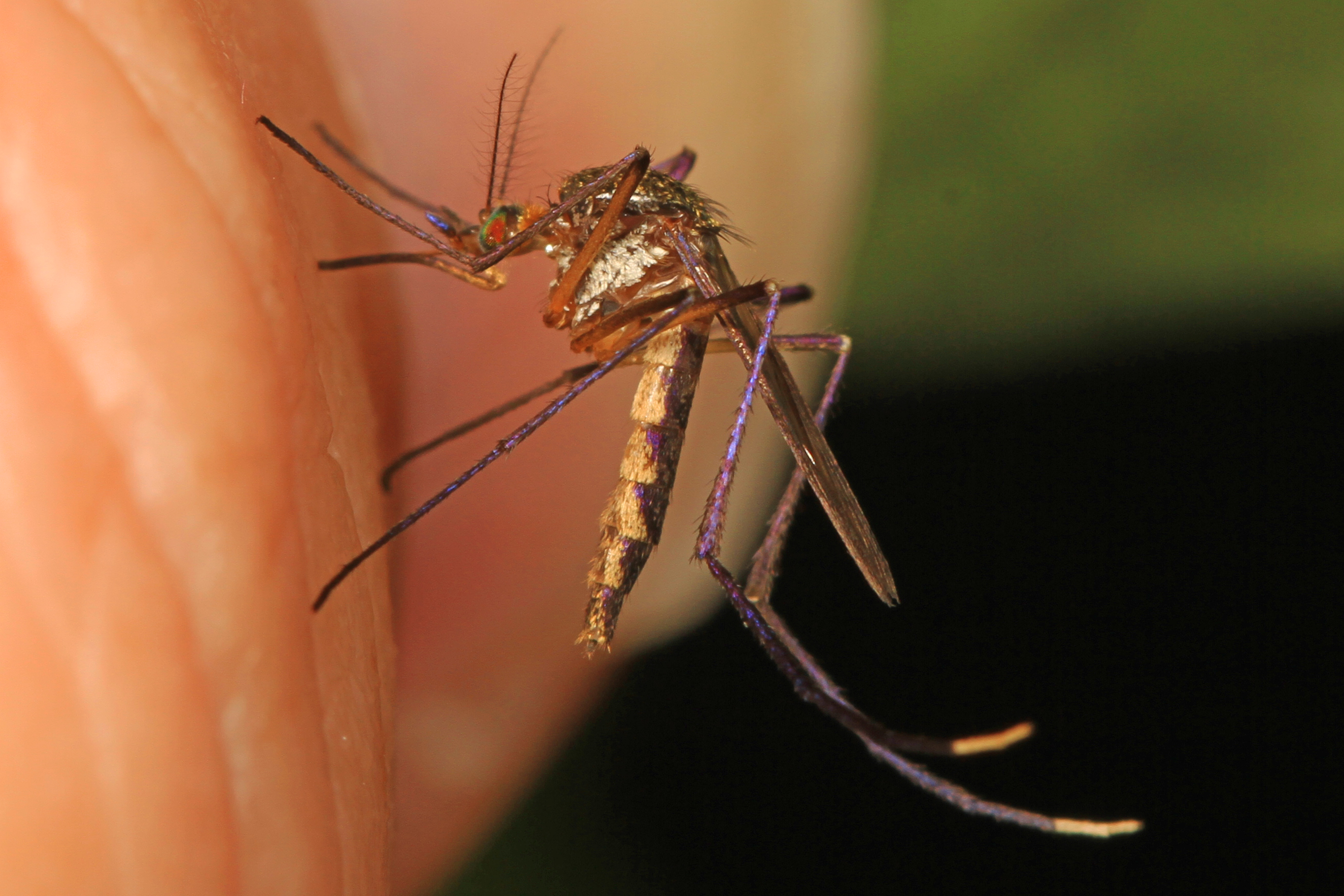

Scientific classification
- Domain: Eukaryota
- Kingdom: Animalia
- Phylum: Arthropoda
- Class: Insecta
- Order: Diptera
- Family: Culicidae
- Genus: Psorophora
- Species: P. cyanescens

Binomial name
- Psorophora cyanescens (Coquillett, 1902)

Synonyms
- Culex cyanescens Coquillett, 1902

= Psorophora cyanescens =

Species of fly

Psorophora cyanescens is a species of mosquito in the family Culicidae.
