= Rampa Rebellion =

Rampa Rebellion may refer to two rebellions in colonial India against British rule in and around Rampachodavaram:

- Rampa rebellion of 1879
- Rampa Rebellion of 1922

== See also ==
- Rampa (disambiguation)
