= Haemagogus clarki =

Scientific classification
- Kingdom: Animalia
- Phylum: Arthropoda
- Class: Insecta
- Order: Diptera
- Family: Culicidae
- Genus: Haemagogus
- Species: H. clarki

Binomial name
- Haemagogus clarki Galindo, Carpenter and Trapido, 1952

Species of fly

Haemogogus clarki is an arboreal mosquito native to southern Central America and northern South America. It is deep brown in color with conspicuous patterns of silver scales on the scutum and pleuron. The specific epithet honors Dr. Herbert C. Clark, former Director of the Gorgas Memorial Laboratory.

== Bionomics ==
Haemagogus species breed primarily in treeholes and cut or broken bamboo internodes above ground level, but are often found in bromeliads and fallen fruits and occasionally in ground pools and rockholes in tropical rain forest, open deciduous and second growth forests, and coastal mangrove associations. The native range of Haemagogus clarki includes Costa Rica, Guyana, Honduras, Nicaragua, Panama, and Venezuela.

== Medical importance ==
Adult females have been recorded biting humans during daylight hours, usually attacking the lower body.

The genus Haemagogus plays a primary role in the transmission of sylvan ("jungle") yellow fever in Central and South America; in laboratory transmission experiments, all species of Haemagogus tested have been found capable of harboring the virus or transmitting it by bite.
