= Aedes vittatus =

Scientific classification
- Kingdom: Animalia
- Phylum: Arthropoda
- Clade: Pancrustacea
- Class: Insecta
- Order: Diptera
- Family: Culicidae
- Genus: Aedes
- Subgenus: Fredwardsius
- Species: A. vittatus

Binomial name
- Aedes vittatus Bigot, 1861

Species of mosquito

Aedes vittatus is a species of mosquito that was first described in 1861 as Culex vittatus from specimens collected on Corsica. In 2000, the species was transferred to the newly erected subgenus Fredwardsius as the type (and only) species representing the subgenus.

== Range ==
The species is found in Africa, South Asia, Southeast Asia, Central Asia, the Middle East, Southern Europe, South America, the Caribbean and North America.

== Habitat ==
The immature stages develop in log holes, hoofprints, boats, wells, tree trunks, tree holes, bamboo cups and pots, occasional utensils, rock pools, rock holes, in pools in rock outcrops or river beds, and coral, and occasionally at the peak of the breeding season, in open concrete floodwater drains. Immature stages have been found in association with A. albopictus, A. malayensis, and Culex species.

In northern Nigeria no adults were caught in traps baited with goats, sheep, monkeys and pig; porcupine was the most important local host.

== Medical importance ==
A demonstrated human-biter, A. vittatus can transmit yellow fever virus in monkeys in the laboratory and was a suspected vector in the 1940 Nuba Mountain epidemic in Sudan in which an estimated 15,000 human cases and 1,500 deaths were reported. A. vittatus is potentially capable of transmitting Zika virus, the causative agent of Zika fever. The adult females have a short crepuscular biting period, with maximum activity between 1800 and 2100 hours.
