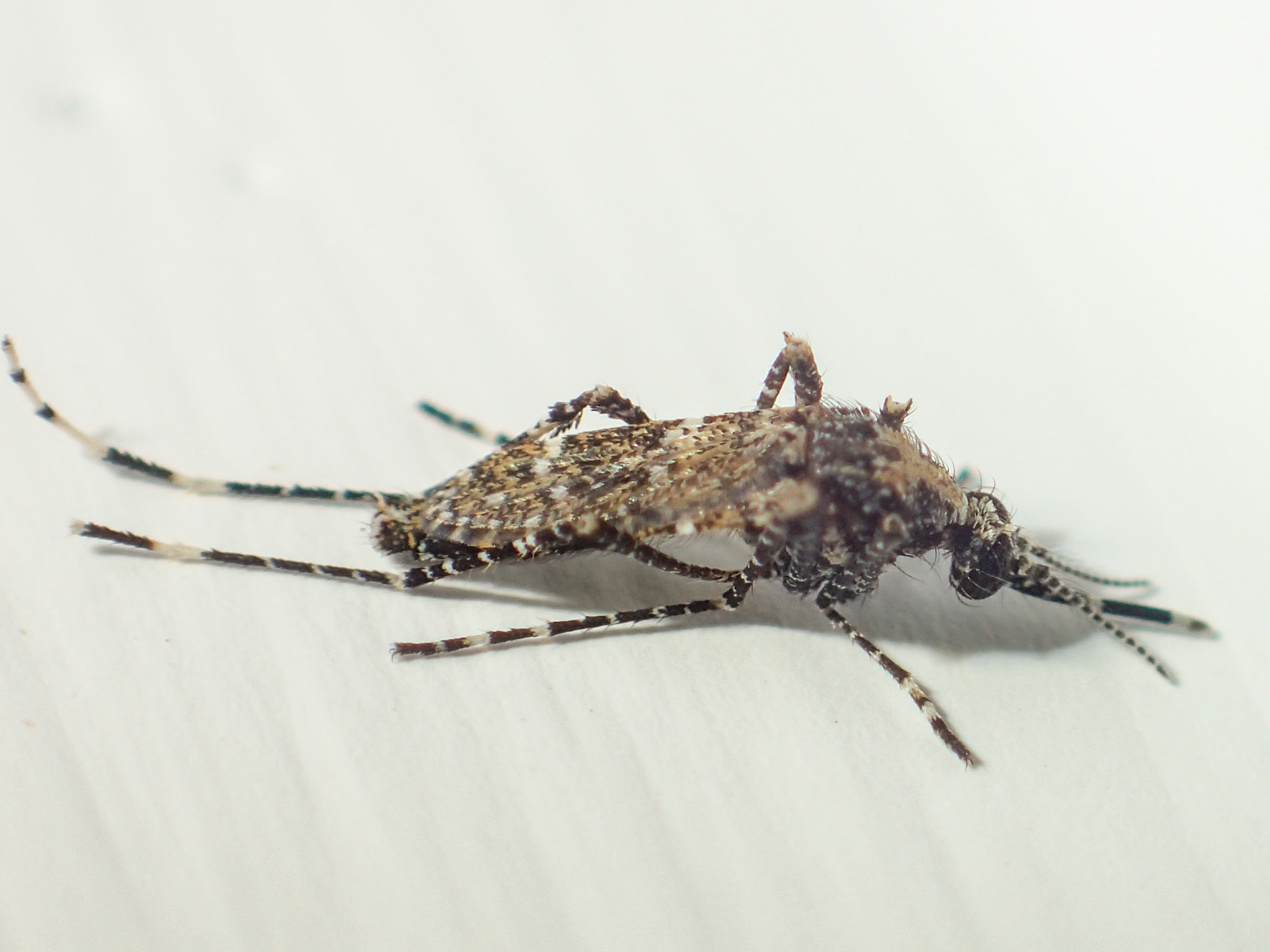

Scientific classification
- Kingdom: Animalia
- Phylum: Arthropoda
- Clade: Pancrustacea
- Class: Insecta
- Order: Diptera
- Family: Culicidae
- Genus: Aedeomyia
- Species: A. catasticta

Binomial name
- Aedeomyia catasticta Knab, 1909

= Aedeomyia catasticta =

Species of insect

Aedeomyia (Aedeomyia) catasticta, is a species of zoophilic mosquito belonging to the genus Aedeomyia. It is found in India, Sri Lanka, Hawaii, Southeast Asian countries and Australia.

== Description ==
Adult female is short and rounded wing densely clothed in broad scales. Antennal segments are short and thick. Proboscis dark with three pale bands. Part of thorax show stellate setae and enormously long setae. Larva can be found from deep swampy habitats and clings to submerged stems of Pistia, Nitella. In Queensland, Alfui virus has been isolated from the adults.
