= Aedes hoogstraali =

Scientific classification
- Kingdom: Animalia
- Phylum: Arthropoda
- Class: Insecta
- Order: Diptera
- Family: Culicidae
- Genus: Aedes
- Subgenus: Scutomyia
- Species: A. hoogstraali

Binomial name
- Aedes hoogstraali Knight and Rozeboom, 1946

Species of mosquito

Aedes hoogstraali is a species of mosquito. It was first described from specimens collected at Subic Bay, Republic of the Philippines in 1945. The specific epithet honors noted entomologist and acarologist Harry Hoogstraal.

== Bionomics ==
The type adults were reared from larvae collected in bamboo stumps, tree holes, and tin cans. The limit of the species' distribution appears to be the Philippines, including Subic Bay, Laguna, and Mount Makiling on the island of Luzon, and San Jose, Occidental Mindoro, on the island of Mindoro.
