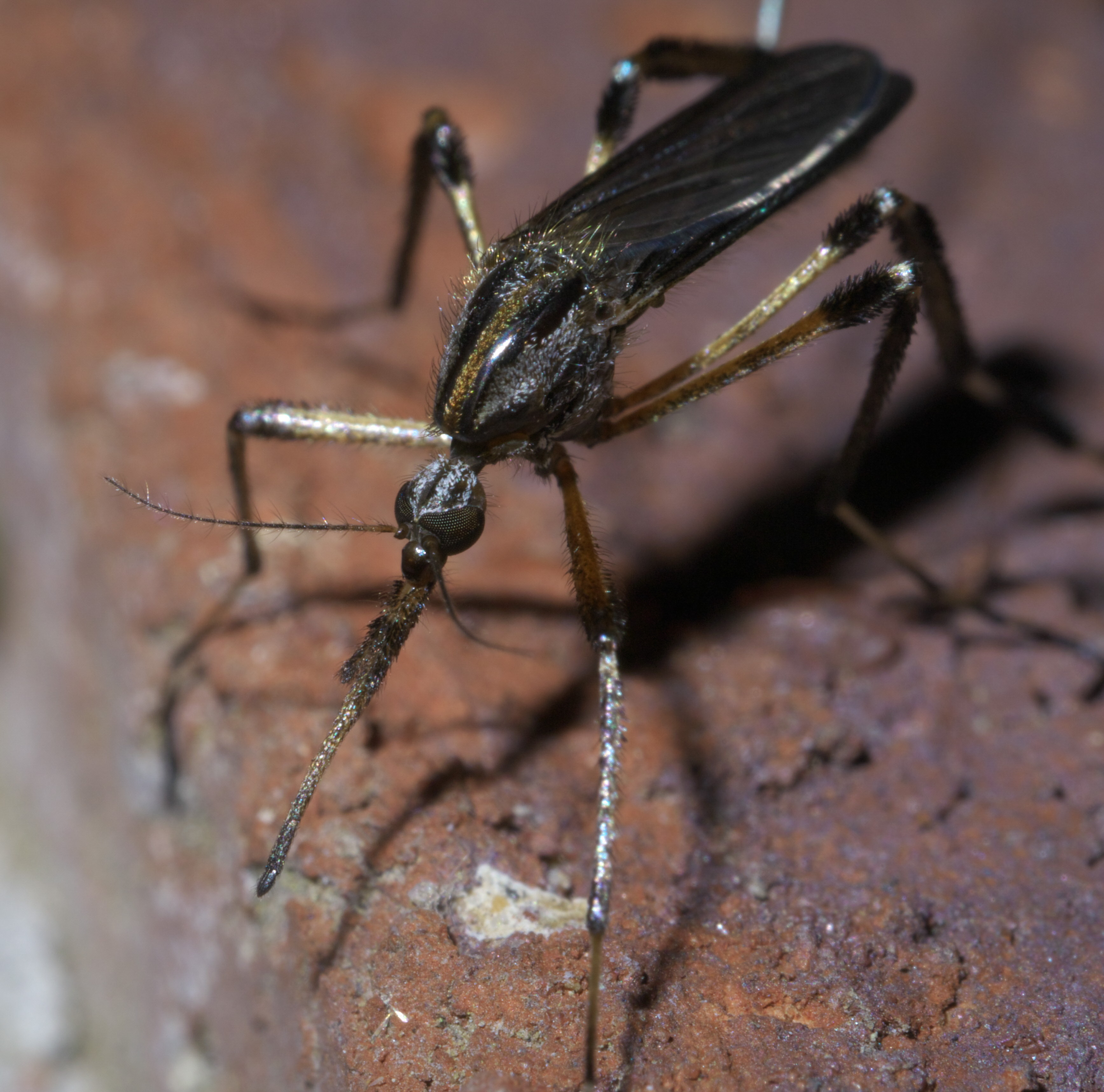
- Female
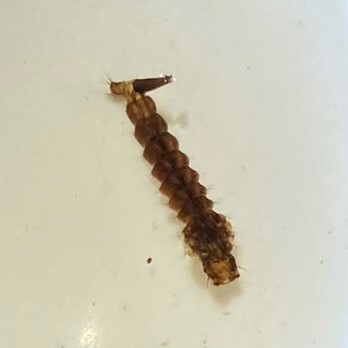
- Larva

Scientific classification
- Kingdom: Animalia
- Phylum: Arthropoda
- Clade: Pancrustacea
- Class: Insecta
- Order: Diptera
- Family: Culicidae
- Genus: Psorophora
- Species: P. ciliata

Binomial name
- Psorophora ciliata Fabricius, 1794
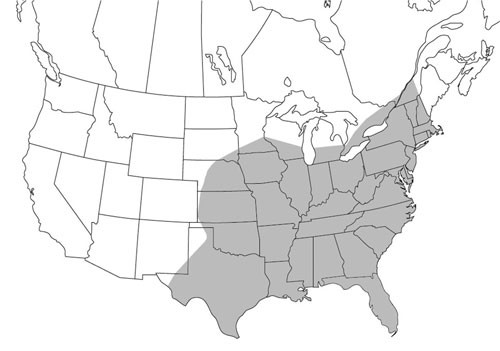
- Range of P. ciliata north of Mexico

Synonyms
- Culex ciliata (Fabricius 1794); Culex conterrens (Walker 1856); Culex molestus (Weidemann 1820); Culex rubidus (Robineau-Desvoidy 1827); Psorophora boscii (Robineau-Desvoidy 1827); Psorophora ctites (Dyar 1918)

= Psorophora ciliata =

Species of mosquito

Psorophora ciliata is a species of large mosquito indigenous to North America east of the continental divide. It is one of thirteen species of the genus that reside in the continental United States. The mosquito has been referred to as the “gallinipper” or “shaggy-legged gallinipper” due to its tendency to behave aggressively.

== Range ==
Psorophora ciliata occurs east of the Continental Divide of the Americas with a range from South Dakota south to Central America and east to Quebec and Florida. In South America, P. ciliata can be found in tropic or temperate environments. These insects may live for up to two years from birth.

== Visual characteristics ==
Psorophora ciliata are relatively large mosquitoes compared to other species within the genus, with a wingspan of 7–9 mm. Males and females are large and yellow-colored. The proboscis is yellow with a black tip. The abdomen is pale with a paler tip. The thorax is dark brown with a thin, bright yellow stripe which goes down the middle with two dark stripes on each side. The most common way to tell the P. ciliata apart from other species is their banded “shaggy” legs. Like all mosquitoes, the males have bushy antennae and the females do not.

== Behavior ==
Not only are these mosquitoes aggressive towards humans and other animals as adults, but P. ciliata larvae are known for preying on other mosquito species' larvae and even tadpoles. Campos, Fernandez, and Sy found in their 2004 study that P. ciliata were frequent predators to the mosquito species Ochlerotatus albifasciatus in Buenos Aires, Argentina and impact the populations of O. albifasciatus.

Females are aggressive, preferring to feed on large mammals, and are most active during spring and summer in woodlands or fields during the day or night. They lay eggs either as single eggs on moist soil, or as an egg raft on top of ephemeral pools of water. Typically, females in the genus are capable of laying their eggs on dry or damp land to hatch months or years later, depending on the species.
