= Haemagogus soperi =

Scientific classification
- Domain: Eukaryota
- Kingdom: Animalia
- Phylum: Arthropoda
- Class: Insecta
- Order: Diptera
- Family: Culicidae
- Genus: Haemagogus
- Species: H. soperi

Binomial name
- Haemagogus soperi Leví-Castillo, 1955

Species of mosquito

Haemagogus soperi is a species of mosquito found in the coastal plain region of Ecuador. The specific epithet honors Dr. Frederick Lowe Soper.

== Bionomics ==
H. soperi is known from the Pacific coastal lowlands of all five provinces of Ecuador; the type specimen was collected in Los Ríos Province, Ecuador.

Immatures develop in broken or cut bamboo internodes and have also been collected from leaf axils and bamboo stumps.

== Medical importance ==
H. soperi is said to readily attack humans and is suspected to be involved in the yellow fever transmission cycle in the endemic regions of the western jungles of Ecuador.
