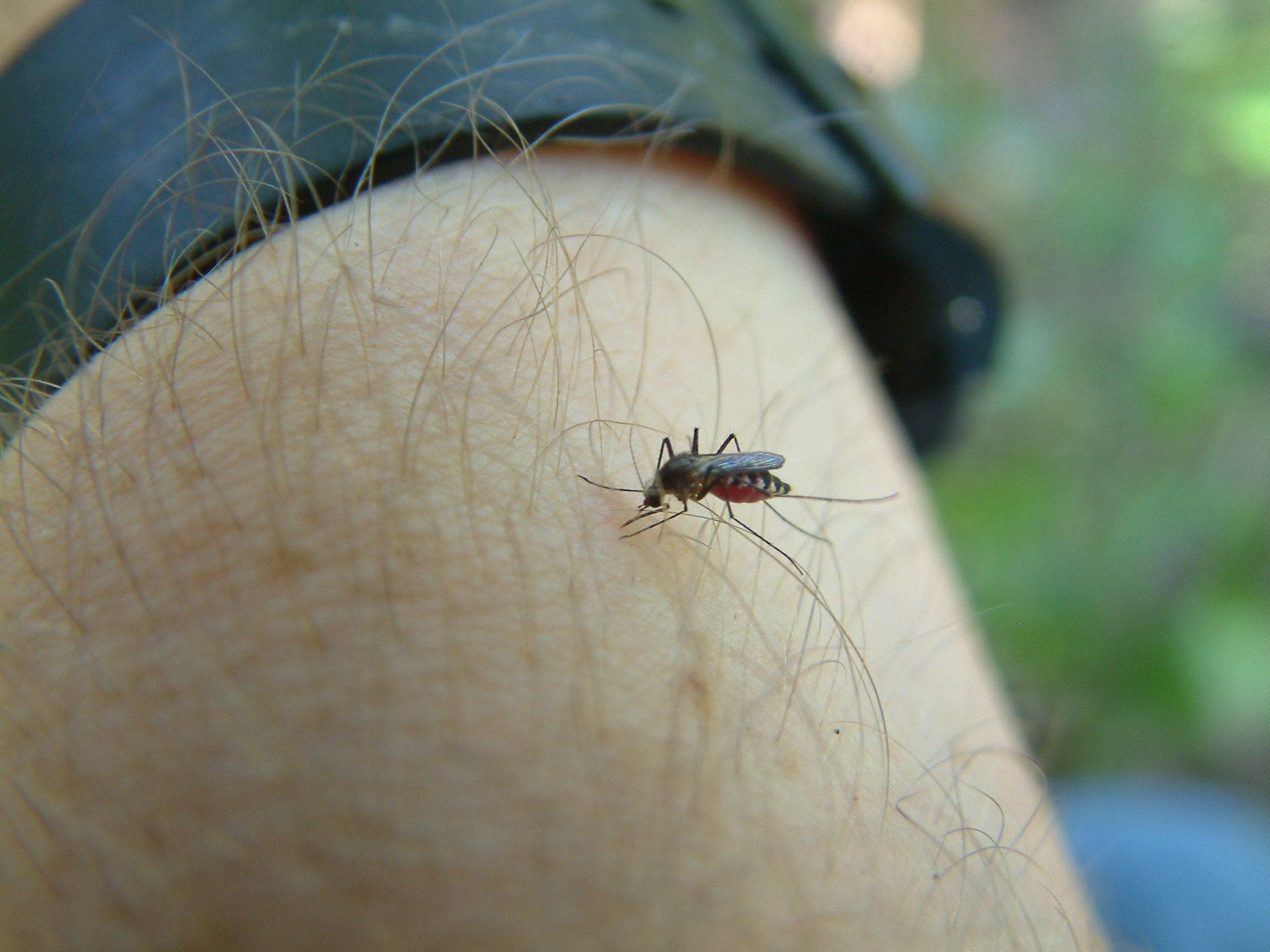

Scientific classification
- Kingdom: Animalia
- Phylum: Arthropoda
- Clade: Pancrustacea
- Class: Insecta
- Order: Diptera
- Family: Culicidae
- Genus: Aedes
- Subgenus: Skusea
- Species: A. pembaensis

Binomial name
- Aedes pembaensis Theobald, 1901

= Aedes pembaensis =

Species of mosquito

Aedes pembaensis is a species of mosquito (Diptera: Culicidae) in the genus Aedes.

== Distribution ==
Aedes pembaensis is the only representative of the Skusea subgenus on the African mainland, but several closely related species (Aedes lambrechti, cartroni, and moucheti) are present in Madagascar and some islands of the Indian Ocean. Aedes pembaensis is found on the east coast of Africa, as far north as Pate Island, Kenya and as far south as Maputo, Mozambique.

The distribution of these mosquitoes seems to be strongly tied to the coast. Females have been found as far as four miles inland, but appear to be most numerous within one mile of the coast, whereas males are rarely found even one mile from the coast

== Biology ==
The larvae of Aedes pembaensis are primarily found in crab holes along the coast. The larvae are able to tolerate high degrees of salinity. Larvae have been found in holes of Sesarma meinerti, Sesarma eulimene, and Cardisoma carnifex. The eggs are laid on the crabs, which then transport the eggs into the holes which are burrowed into the water table. Occasionally larvae are found in other habitats, such as tree holes or pineapple axils.

The adult females feed on a variety of different hosts. Adults feed readily on humans. Parasites of dogs, cats, and donkeys have also been found in female Aedes pembaensis. Females were also shown to feed on lemurs and an anaesthetized monkey.

Females readily enter human habitations. In a survey on Pate Island in Kenya in 1956, 98 percent of mosquitoes collected in houses using a pyrethrum spray catch were Aedes pembaensis.

== Medical importance ==
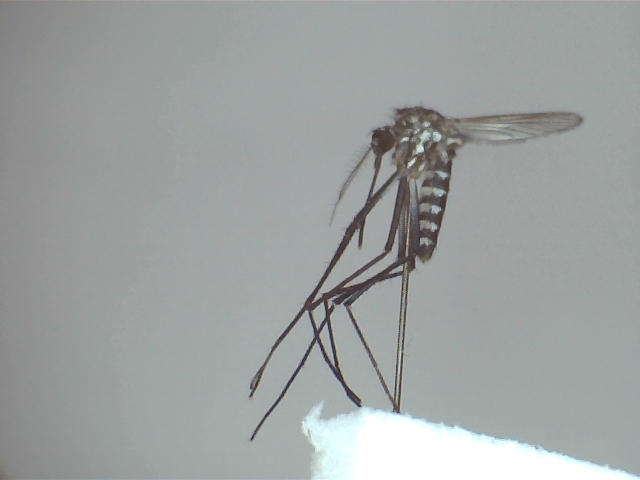
Female Aedes pembaensis collected in Tanga, Tanzania

Though originally thought to be a vector of Wuchereria bancrofti, further testing has shown Aedes pembaensis to be a poor vector. Lumbo virus has been found in the mosquitoes in Mozambique, but this virus does not appear to be pathogenic in humans.

In recent entomological investigations of an outbreak of Rift Valley Fever virus in Kenya (2006-2007), Aedes pembaensis were collected and several were infected with the virus. It is not known if Aedes pembaensis is capable of transmitting Rift Valley Fever virus.
