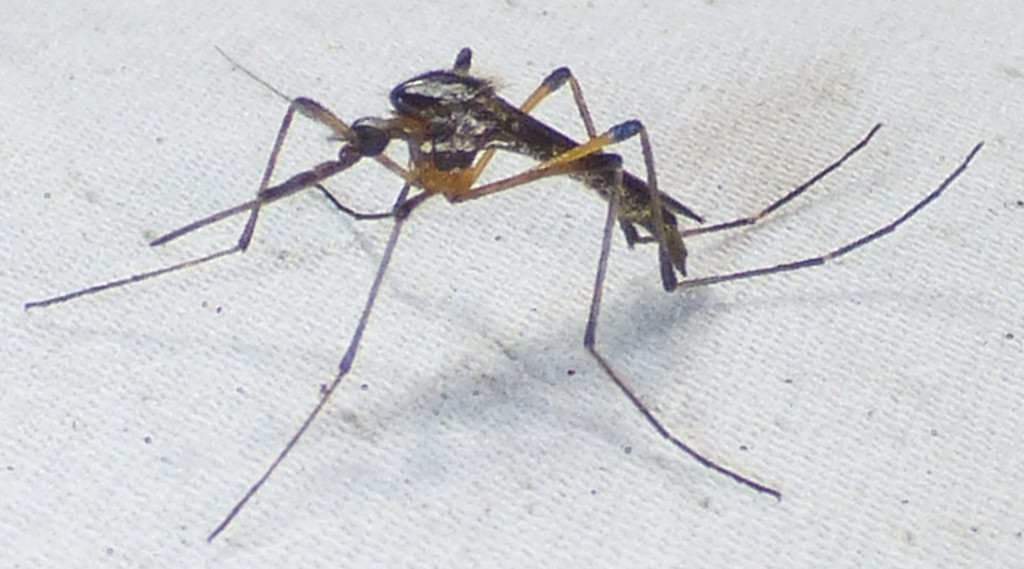

Scientific classification
- Kingdom: Animalia
- Phylum: Arthropoda
- Class: Insecta
- Order: Diptera
- Family: Culicidae
- Genus: Psorophora
- Species: P. howardii

Binomial name
- Psorophora howardii Coquillett, 1901

= Psorophora howardii =

Species of fly

Psorophora howardii is a species of mosquito. The species was described by the American entomologist Daniel William Coquillett in 1901.

== Description ==
This mosquito is very large, has shaggy legs, and has a wing length of 6.0–6.5 mm (0.24–0.26 in). The scales on the wings are narrow and dark brown. The proboscis is long and brown. The palpi are nearly half as long as the proboscis and brown. The proboscis and the palpi are covered with setae. The head has broad, flat, grayish-white scales except for a narrow median bare stripe. The thorax is dark brown to black. The abdomen has a broad median patch of white scales. The legs are dark yellow and purple. The adult females are persistent biters and will attack at any time of the day. It can spread the West Nile virus, and can puncture clothing such as through a coat, vest, and two shirts since the species is 8 to 10 mm long.

== Habitat ==
The mosquito can be found in the Southeastern United States, Mexico, the West Indies, and Central America, breeding in rain pools, grassy ditches, and depressions. P. howardii can be found in citrus furrow irrigation systems in coastal southeastern Florida; it oviposits low in the furrows. The eggs hatch by rainfall and irrigation.

== Larvae ==
The larvae occur from March to October, and can be found in unshaded or partly shaded temporary rain-filled pools. They are large, and prey on the larvae of other mosquitoes. To collect a field sample, a long-handled dipper causes a minimum of disturbance to the larvae. An area sampler is used after the dipper which catches more.
