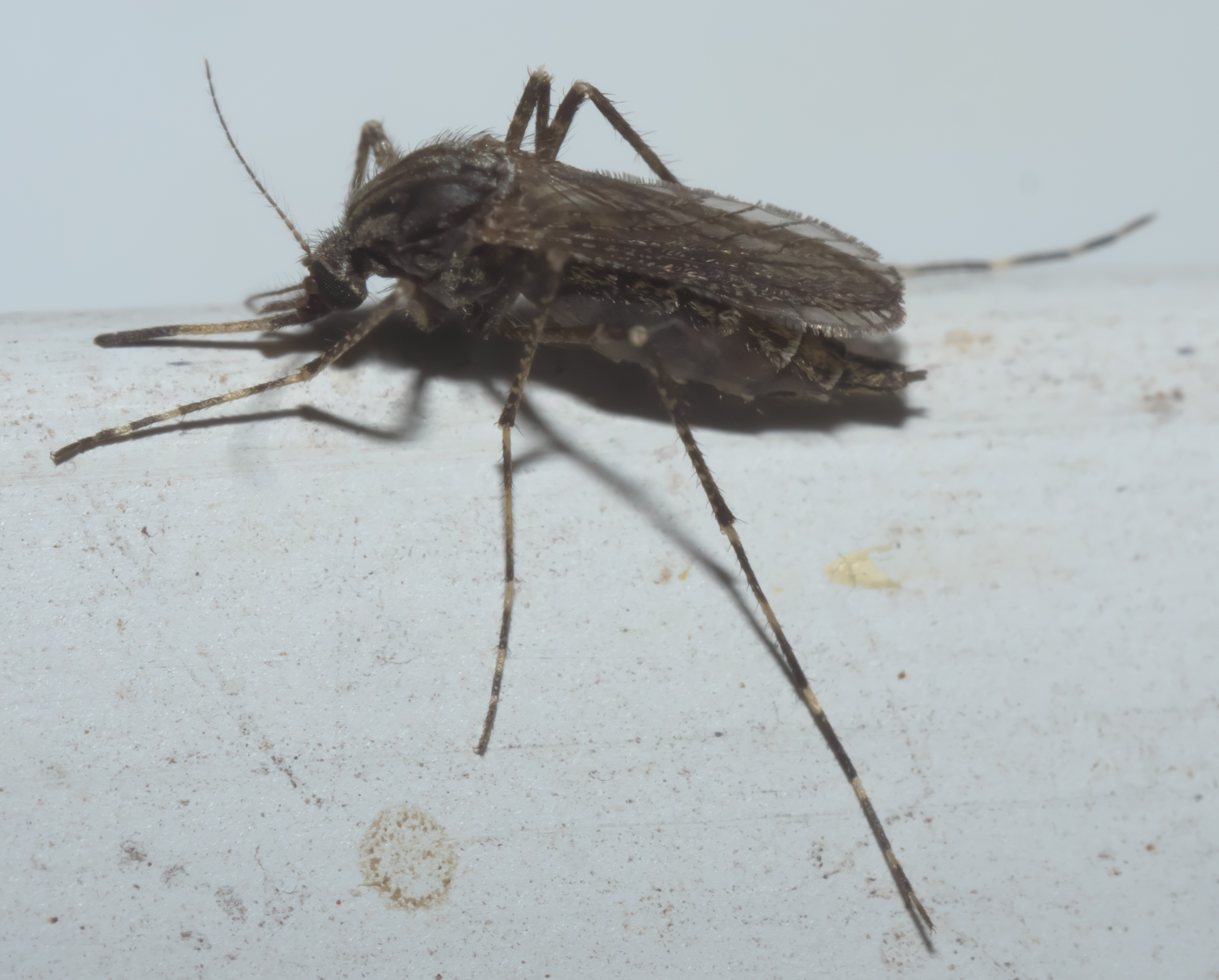

Scientific classification
- Kingdom: Animalia
- Phylum: Arthropoda
- Class: Insecta
- Order: Diptera
- Family: Culicidae
- Genus: Psorophora
- Species: P. columbiae

Binomial name
- Psorophora columbiae (Dyar & Knab, 1906)

Synonyms
- Janthinosoma columbiae Dyar and Knab, 1906; Janthinosoma floridense Dyar and Knab, 1906; Janthinosoma texanum Dyar and Knab, 1906

= Psorophora columbiae =

Species of fly

Psorophora columbiae, known generally as the dark ricefield mosquito or glades mosquito, is a species of mosquito in the family Culicidae. They can be found in North America, primarily in the southern United States, such as Arkansas, Louisiana, and Texas.

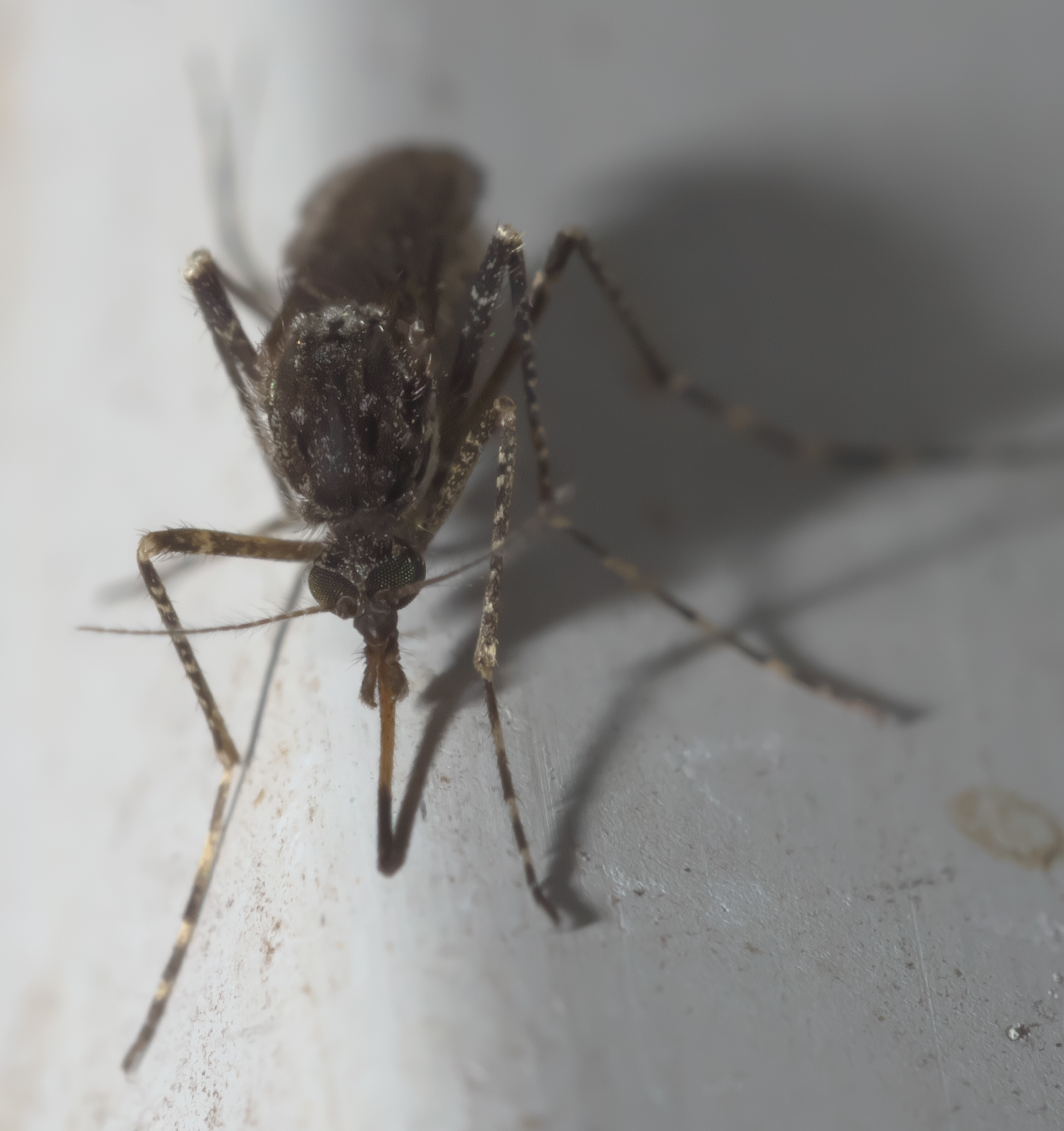
Dark ricefield mosquito, Psorophora columbiae

== Effective repellents ==
30% or more lemon eucalyptus is effective for this difficult-to-repel mosquito.
