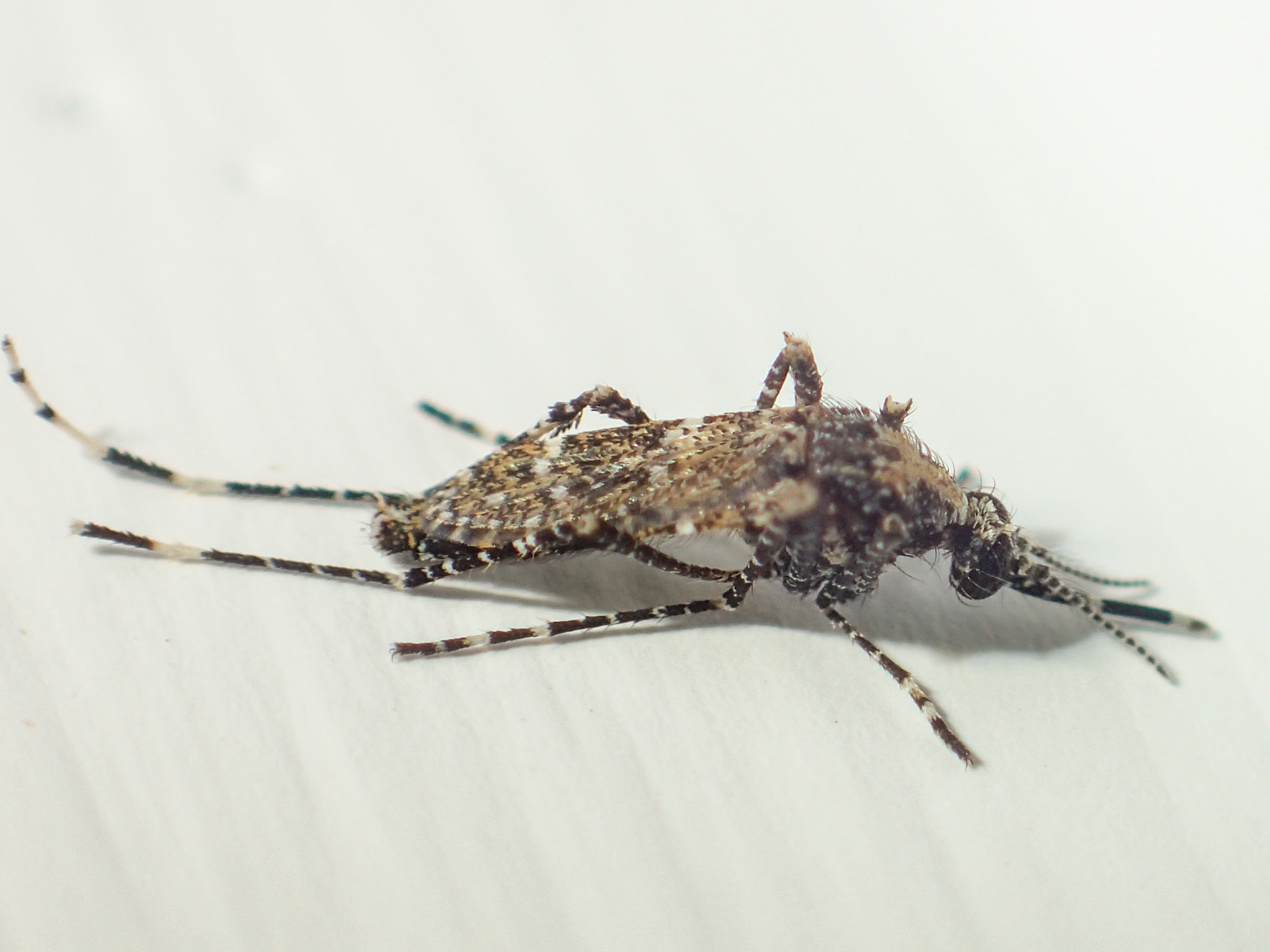
- Aedeomyia catasticta

Scientific classification
- Kingdom: Animalia
- Phylum: Arthropoda
- Clade: Pancrustacea
- Class: Insecta
- Order: Diptera
- Family: Culicidae
- Subfamily: Culicinae
- Tribe: Aedeomyiini
- Genus: Aedeomyia; Theobald, 1901

Synonyms
- Aedomyia Edwards, 1912; Aedomyia Giles, 1902

= Aedeomyia =

Genus of mosquitoes

Aedeomyia is a genus of mosquitoes in the family Culicidae, comprising seven recognized species. These mosquitoes are distributed across tropical and subtropical regions worldwide, including Africa, Asia, Australia, and the Americas. Certain species, notably A. squamipennis, are vectors of arboviruses such as the Gamboa virus and potentially the Venezuelan Equine Encephalitis virus.

== Description ==
Aedeomyia mosquitoes are distinguished by their broad scales and antennal structures. Females possess stout antennal flagellomeres, while males exhibit thickened apical flagellomeres. The larvae are identifiable by their swollen, strongly curved antennae, which exceed the length of the head capsule.

== Distribution ==
Species of Aedeomyia inhabit tropical and subtropical zones across multiple biogeographical regions: - Afrotropical: Sub-Saharan Africa (e.g., A. africana). - Australasian: Australia and nearby islands (e.g., A. venustipes). - Nearctic: North America (recently, A. squamipennis in Florida, USA). - Neotropical: Central America and South America, including the Caribbean (e.g., A. squamipennis). - Oriental: Southeast Asia and parts of Asia.

A. squamipennis, originally endemic to Central and South America, has expanded its range into Florida, USA, as documented in recent studies.

== Species ==
The genus Aedeomyia includes the following seven species:

- Aedeomyia africana Neveu-Lemaire, 1906
- Aedeomyia catasticta Knab, 1909
- Aedeomyia furfurea (Enderlein, 1923)
- Aedeomyia madagascarica Brunhes, Boussès & Ramos, 2011
- Aedeomyia pauliani Grjebine, 1953
- Aedeomyia squamipennis (Lynch Arribalzaga, 1878)
- Aedeomyia venustipes (Skuse, 1889)

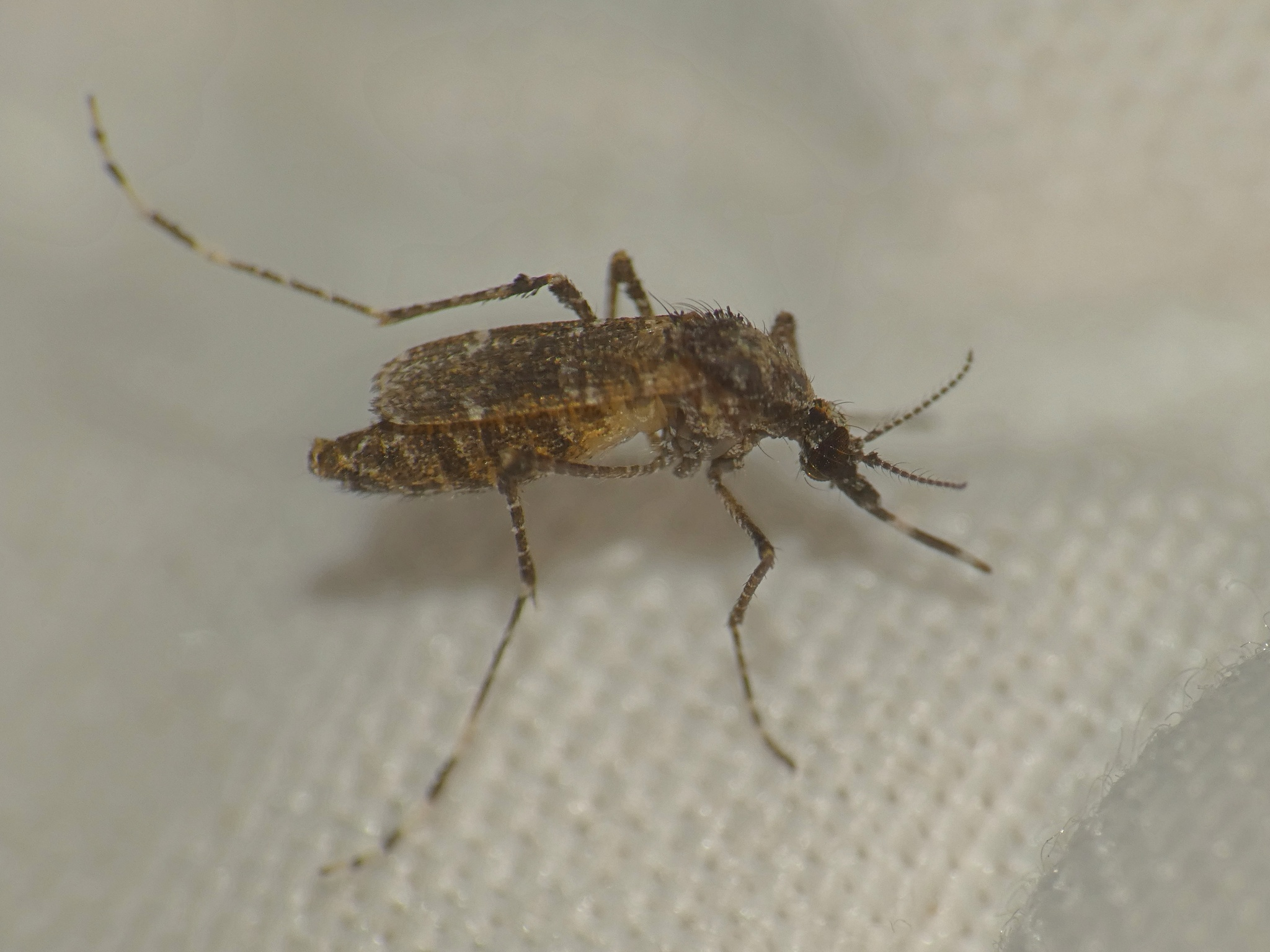
Aedeomyia venustipes

== Biology ==
Aedeomyia mosquitoes are primarily nocturnal. They predominantly feed on birds in forest canopies, though species like A. africana and A. furfurea have been recorded biting humans, particularly in forested areas. The larvae develop in shaded freshwater habitats with abundant floating vegetation, such as ponds containing Pistia or Salvinia, or tree holes, often alongside other mosquito genera like Aedes, Culex, and Uranotaenia.

== Medical Importance ==
A. squamipennis transmits the Gamboa virus (a bunyavirus) and is suspected to carry the Venezuelan Equine Encephalitis (VEE) virus, which can cause encephalitis in horses and human. It is also an avian malaria vector.
