= Eretmapodites =

Scientific classification
- Kingdom: Animalia
- Phylum: Arthropoda
- Clade: Pancrustacea
- Class: Insecta
- Order: Diptera
- Family: Culicidae
- Tribe: Aedini
- Genus: Eretmapodites; Theobald, 1901

Genus of flies

The Afrotropical mosquito genus Eretmapodites contains species that exhibit facultative cannibalism in their larval developmental stages. The genus was first described in 1901 by Frederick Vincent Theobald. The type species is Eretmapodites quinquevittatus Theobald

== Bionomics ==
Eretmapodites larvae feed primarily on decaying organic matter, but become cannibalistic when other food becomes scarce, and sometimes even in the presence of abundant other food material.

Larval breeding-places include small collections of water in larger fallen leaves, old tins and bottles, snail shells, plant axils, cut bamboo, and rarely tree holes. Some species seem to breed exclusively in plant axils; the majority are most frequently found in fallen leaves in forest habitat. They are strongly bottom-dwelling, so much so that when the water is poured out of a leaf containing them, most remain on the surface of the leaf until washed off; larvae of species collected in Uganda and Sierra Leone have been observed crawling over the surface of the leaf.

When they become cannibalistic, they are predatory on other mosquito larvae, aquatic larvae of other small Diptera, and aquatic oligochaetes and nematodes. Smaller mosquito larvae are consumed whole, but larger ones have their internal contents sucked out, probably due to the difficulty of masticating their chitinous exoskeletons. Predatory larvae also attack pupae, seizing them by the tail and keeping them under water until they drown. Killed pupae are not eaten immediately, but left intact until partly decomposed and then eaten.

Predatory larvae have a thickened, comb-like modification of a group of the hairs on the medioventral aspect of the mouth brushes resembling those found in the predatory species Lutzia tigripes. After seizing their prey, Eretmapodites larvae hold it between the half-flexed head and the ventral surface of the thorax and consume it rapidly, devouring a large larva in about 10 minutes.

== Medical importance ==
Eretmapodites species have been demonstrated to be laboratory vectors of yellow fever and chikungunya. Viruses isolated from wild-caught Eretmapodites include Rift Valley fever, Semliki forest, Spondweni, Nyando, Okola, Middleburg, Nkolbisson, and Bunyamwera viruses and an undefined viral agent, MTMP 131.

== Species ==
Species listed by the Walter Reed Biosystematics Unit:

- Eretmapodites adami Ferrara and Eouzan
- Eretmapodites angolensis da Cunha Ramos and Ribeiro
- Eretmapodites argyrurus Edwards
- Eretmapodites brenguesi Rickenbach and Lombrici
- Eretmapodites brottesi Rickenbach
- Eretmapodites caillardi Rickenbach, Ferrara, and Eouzan
- Eretmapodites chrysogaster Graham
- Eretmapodites corbeti Hamon
- Eretmapodites dracaenae Edwards (syn. Eretmapodites ferox Haddow)
- Eretmapodites dundo da Cunha Ramos and Ribeiro
- Eretmapodites eouzani Rickenbach and Lombrici
- Eretmapodites ferrarai Rickenbach and Eouzan
- Eretmapodites forcipulatus Edwards
- Eretmapodites germaini Rickenbach and Eouzan
- Eretmapodites gilletti van Someren
- Eretmapodites grahami Edwards
- Eretmapodites grenieri Hamon and van Someren
- Eretmapodites haddowi van Someren
- Eretmapodites hamoni Grjebine
- Eretmapodites harperi van Someren
- Eretmapodites hightoni van Someren
- Eretmapodites inornatus Newstead
- Eretmapodites intermedius Edwards
- Eretmapodites jani Rickenbach and Lombrici
- Eretmapodites lacani Rickenbach and Eouzan
- Eretmapodites leucopous Graham
- Eretmapodites mahaffyi van Someren
- Eretmapodites marcelleae Adam and Hamon
- Eretmapodites mattinglyi Hamon and van Someren
- Eretmapodites melanopous Graham
- Eretmapodites mortiauxi Cunha Ramos and Ribeiro
- Eretmapodites oedipodeios Graham (syn. Eretmapodites stanleyi Edwards)
- Eretmapodites parvipluma Edwards
- Eretmapodites pauliani Grjebine
- Eretmapodites penicillatus Edwards
- Eretmapodites plioleucus Edwards
- Eretmapodites ssp. brevis Edwards
- Eretmapodites productus Edwards
- Eretmapodites quinquevittatus Theobald (syn. Eretmapodites austenii Theobald, Eretmapodites condei Ventrillon, Eretmapodites ravissei Rickenbach and Eouzan)
- Eretmapodites rickenbachi Ferrara and Eouzan
- Eretmapodites salauni Rickenbach, Ferrara & Eouzan
- Eretmapodites semisimplicipes Edwards
- Eretmapodites silvestris Ingram & de Meillon (subsp. Eretmapodites conchobius Edwards)
- Eretmapodites subsimplicipes Edwards
- Eretmapodites tendeiroi da Cunha Ramos, Ribeiro and de Barros Machado
- Eretmapodites tonsus Edwards
- Eretmapodites vansomereni Hamon
- Eretmapodites wansoni Edwards (subsp. Eretmapodites douceti Adam and Hamon)
