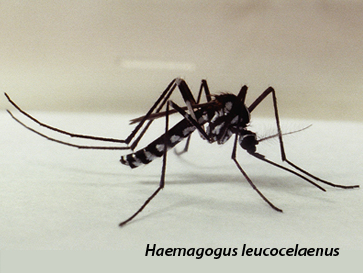
- Haemagogus leucocelaenus

Scientific classification
- Kingdom: Animalia
- Phylum: Arthropoda
- Clade: Pancrustacea
- Class: Insecta
- Order: Diptera
- Family: Culicidae
- Subfamily: Culicinae
- Tribe: Aedini
- Genus: Haemagogus; Williston, 1896

Type species
- Haemagogus splendens Williston, 1896

Synonyms
- Cacomyia Coquillett, 1906

= Haemagogus =

Genus of flies

Haemagogus is a genus of mosquitoes in the dipteran family Culicidae. They mainly occur in Central America and northern South America (including Trinidad), although some species inhabit forested areas of Brazil, and range as far as northern Argentina. In the Rio Grande Do Sul area of Brazil, one species, H. leucocelaenus, has been found carrying yellow fever virus. Several species have a distinct metallic sheen.

Species of this genus are vectors in the transmission of sylvan or "jungle" yellow fever, which is often carried by monkeys in the forest canopies. Haemagogus species have also been found to carry the Mayaro virus and Ilhéus virus. As these mosquitoes, in general, have relatively long lives, they can transmit viruses for long periods.

They tend to live in the canopy of forests, where the female lays eggs in between layers of tree bark or in cut bamboo. The eggs adhere to the surface and when submerged by rain water develop into larvae.

== Species ==
- Haemagogus acutisentis Arnell, 1973
- Haemagogus aeritinctus Galindo & Trapido, 1967
- Haemagogus albomaculatus Theobald, 1903
- Haemagogus anastasionis Dyar, 1921
- Haemagogus andinus Osorno-Mesa, 1944
- Haemagogus argyromeris Dyar & Ludlow, 1921
- Haemagogus baresi Cerqueira, 1960
- Haemagogus boshelli Osorno-Mesa, 1944
- Haemagogus capricornii Lutz, 1904
- Haemagogus celeste Dyar & Nunez Tovar, 1926
- Haemagogus chalcospilans Dyar, 1921
- Haemagogus chrysochlorus Arnell, 1973
- Haemagogus clarki Galindo, Carpenter and Trapido, 1952
- Haemagogus equinus Theobald, 1903
- Haemagogus iridicolor Dyar, 1921
- Haemagogus janthinomys Dyar, 1921
- Haemagogus leucocelaenus Dyar & Shannon, 1924
- Haemagogus leucophoebus Galindo, Carpenter and Trapido, 1952
- Haemagogus leucotaeniatus Komp, 1938
- Haemagogus lucifer Howard, Dyar & Knab, 1912
- Haemagogus mesodentatus Komp & Kumm, 1938
- Haemagogus nebulosus Arnell, 1973
- Haemagogus panarchys Dyar, 1921
- Haemagogus regalis Dyar & Knab, 1906
- Haemagogus soperi Levi-Castillo, 1955
- Haemagogus spegazzinii Brethes, 1912
- Haemagogus splendens Williston, 1896
- Haemagogus tropicalis Cerqueira & Antunes, 1938

== Yellow fever epidemics involving Haemagogus species ==
The discovery in 1953 by two scientists from the Trinidad Regional Virus Laboratory of a sick red howler monkey that was found to be suffering from yellow fever provided the first indication that yellow fever was still endemic in Trinidad although there had not been a case reliably reported from Trinidad since an outbreak in 1914. Blood specimens taken from over 4,500 humans in late 1953 and early 1954 and checked to detect the presence of a wide variety of known viruses showed that 15% had antibodies to the yellow fever virus. A form of the disease, termed "jungle yellow fever", was shown to be carried by red howler monkeys (Alouatta seniculus insulanus Elliot) that provided a continuous reservoir for the disease, which was then spread by the Haemagogus s. spegazzini mosquito which normally inhabits rainforest regions, both at ground level and in the treetops.

After government felling of large stands of native forest, yellow fever virus was isolated from a patient from Cumaca in the northern range in 1954. The infection soon spread to other humans and into the Aedes aegypti mosquito population, greatly increasing transmission. Warnings were made that an epidemic was imminent and Dr. Wilbur Downs and Dr. A. E. (Ted) Hill, a specialist in tropical medicine, began a program of inoculating health workers and stockpiling vaccine. Trinidad health authorities followed up with large-scale vaccination and intensive anti-aegypti measures including public education, regular inspection for breeding sites, and spraying of domestic residences with DDT. In spite of these measures, and the fact that an estimated 80% of the population of Port of Spain were immune to yellow fever and dengue, several more cases were soon reported. Most probably due to the health measures taken, it did not develop into a widespread epidemic in Trinidad itself.

An attempt was made to totally quarantine the island just before Christmas, 1954, but the disease spread to the nearby mainland of Venezuela and, from there, all the way to southern Mexico, probably killing several thousand people in the process.

In 1998 an epidemic of yellow fever killed many howler monkeys near the city of Altamira, Pará in the eastern Amazon basin, in Brazil. The virus was isolated in specimens of Haemagogus janthinomys mosquitoes.
