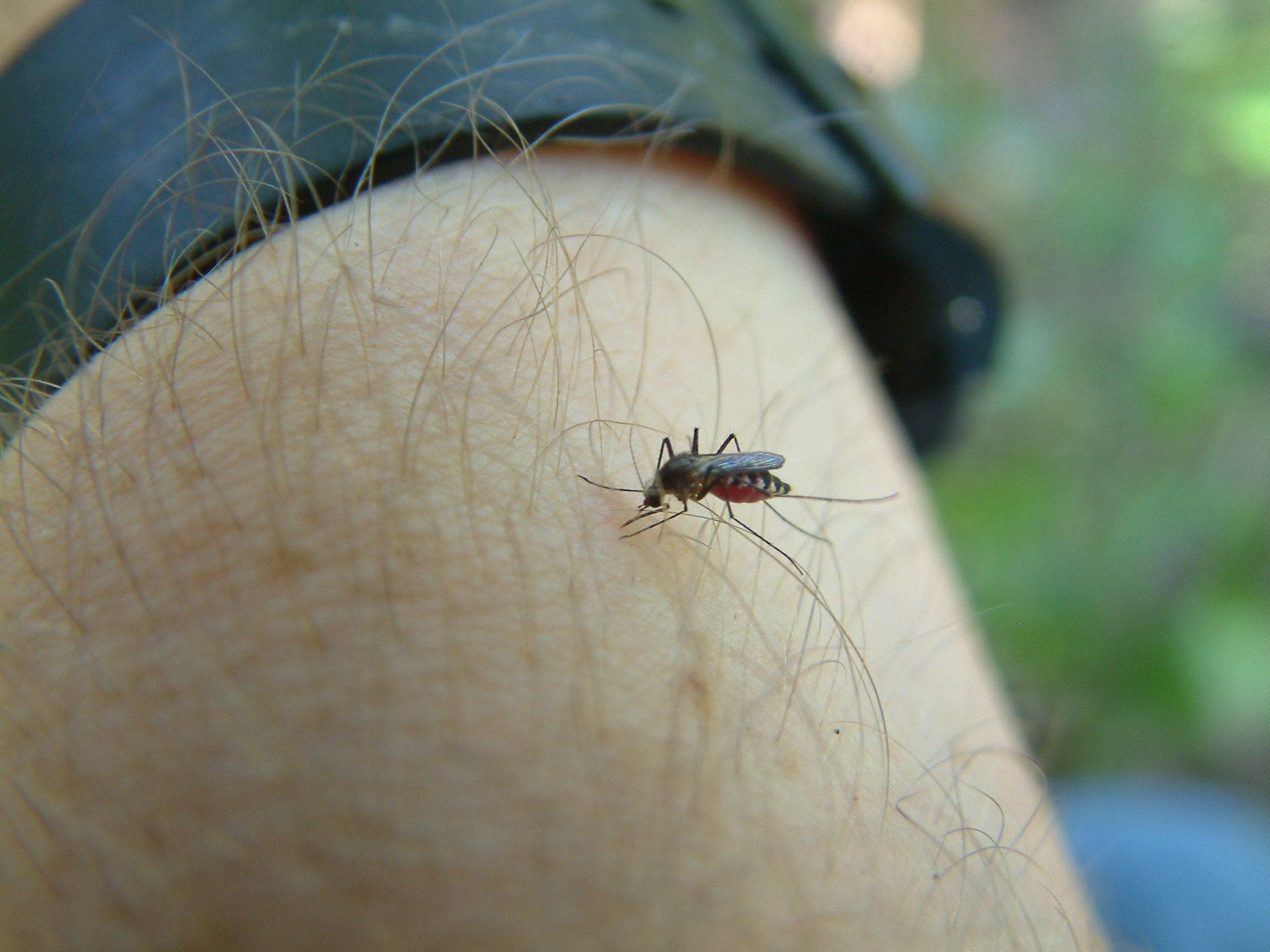
- Skusea pembaensis biting a human arm.

Scientific classification
- Kingdom: Animalia
- Phylum: Arthropoda
- Clade: Pancrustacea
- Class: Insecta
- Order: Diptera
- Family: Culicidae
- Genus: Aedes
- Subgenus: Skusea; Theobald, 1903

Species
- Skusea cartroni; Skusea lambrechti; Skusea moucheti; Skusea pembaensis

= Skusea =

Genus of flies

Skusea is a mosquito genus (or a subgenus of Aedes) in the family Culicidae. Before the reclassification of aedine genera, Skusea pembaensis was known as Aedes pembaensis.

== See also ==
- List of mosquito genera
