= Aedes (Fredwardsius) =

Scientific classification
- Kingdom: Animalia
- Phylum: Arthropoda
- Class: Insecta
- Order: Diptera
- Family: Culicidae
- Genus: Aedes
- Subgenus: Fredwardsius; Reinert, 2000

Species
- Aedes vittatus

Synonyms
- Fredwardsius Reinert, 2000

Subgenus of insects

Aedes (Fredwardsius) is a subgenus of the genus Aedes with distribution in southern Europe, southern Asia, and Africa. The subgenus was erected in 2000 after a comparison of specimens of Aedes vittatus with all other recognized genera and subgenera in the mosquito tribe Aedini indicated that the species had sufficiently unusual and unique morphological and other features of subgeneric rank significance to merit stand-alone status. Aedes vittatus was established as the type species, and is currently (2016) the only species in the subgenus, making Fredwardsius a monotypic taxon.

The subgenus was named to honor British entomologist Frederick Wallace Edwards, who during over 30 years of work at the British Museum of Natural History, now the Natural History Museum, London, published numerous articles on the systematics of the Culicidae establishing the basic generic and subgeneric framework of the family Culicidae.

The three-letter abbreviation for the subgenus is Fre.

== Species ==
- Aedes vittatus (Bigot, 1861)
