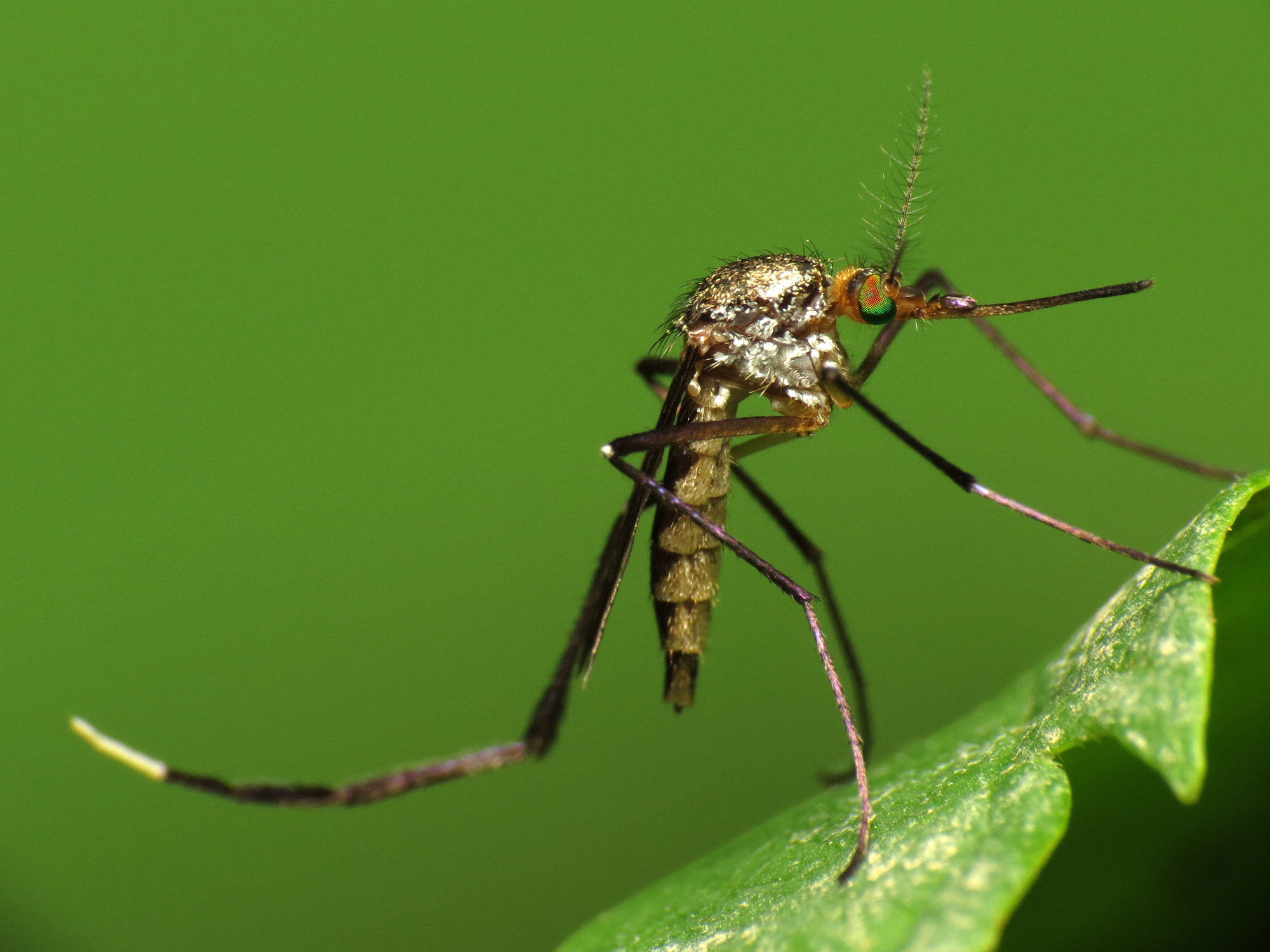
- Psorophora ferox female

Scientific classification
- Kingdom: Animalia
- Phylum: Arthropoda
- Clade: Pancrustacea
- Class: Insecta
- Order: Diptera
- Family: Culicidae
- Tribe: Aedini
- Genus: Psorophora; Robineau-Desvoidy, 1827

Type species
- Culex ciliatus (Fabricius, 1794)

= Psorophora =

Genus of mosquitoes

Psorophora is a genus of mosquitoes in the subfamily Culicinae and tribe Aedini, described by French entomologist Robineau-Desvoidy in 1827. The subgenera and species included within Psorophora are listed below.

== Subgenera and species ==
=== Subgenus Psorophora ===
- Psorophora ciliata
- Psorophora cilipes
- Psorophora holmbergii
- Psorophora howardii
- Psorophora lineata
- Psorophora ochripes
- Psorophora pallescens
- Psorophora pilipes
- Psorophora saeva
- Psorophora stonei

=== Subgenus Janthinosoma ===
- Psorophora albigenu
- Psorophora albipes
- Psorophora amazonica
- Psorophora champerico
- Psorophora circumflava
- Psorophora cyanescens
- Psorophora discrucians
- Psorophora ferox
- Psorophora fiebrigi
- Psorophora forceps
- Psorophora horrida
- Psorophora johnstonii
- Psorophora lanei
- Psorophora longipalpus
- Psorophora lutzii
- Psorophora mathesoni
- Psorophora melanota
- Psorophora mexicana
- Psorophora pilosa
- Psorophora pseudoalbipes
- Psorophora pseudomelanota
- Psorophora totonaci
- Psorophora varipes

=== Subgenus Grabhamia ===
- Psorophora cingulata
- Psorophora columbiae
- Psorophora confinnis
- Psorophora dimidiata
- Psorophora discolor
- Psorophora funiculus
- Psorophora infinis
- Psorophora insularius
- Psorophora jamaicensis
- Psorophora leucocnemis
- Psorophora paulli
- Psorophora santamarinai
- Psorophora pygmaea
- Psorophora signipennis
- Psorophora tolteca
- Psorophora varinervis

== Gallery ==
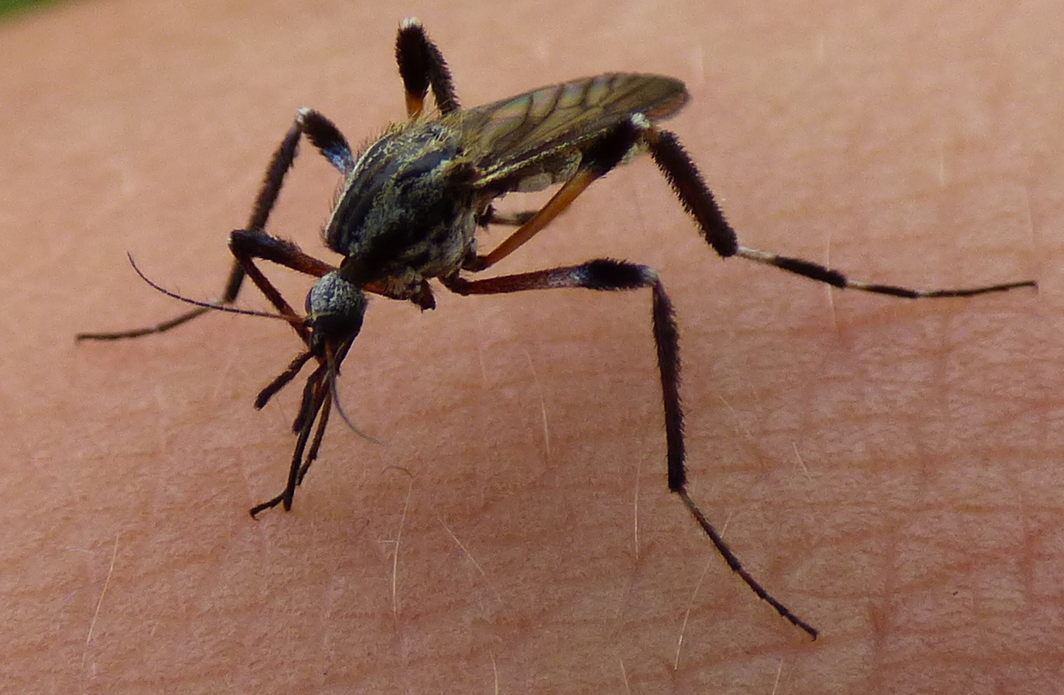
P. holmbergi

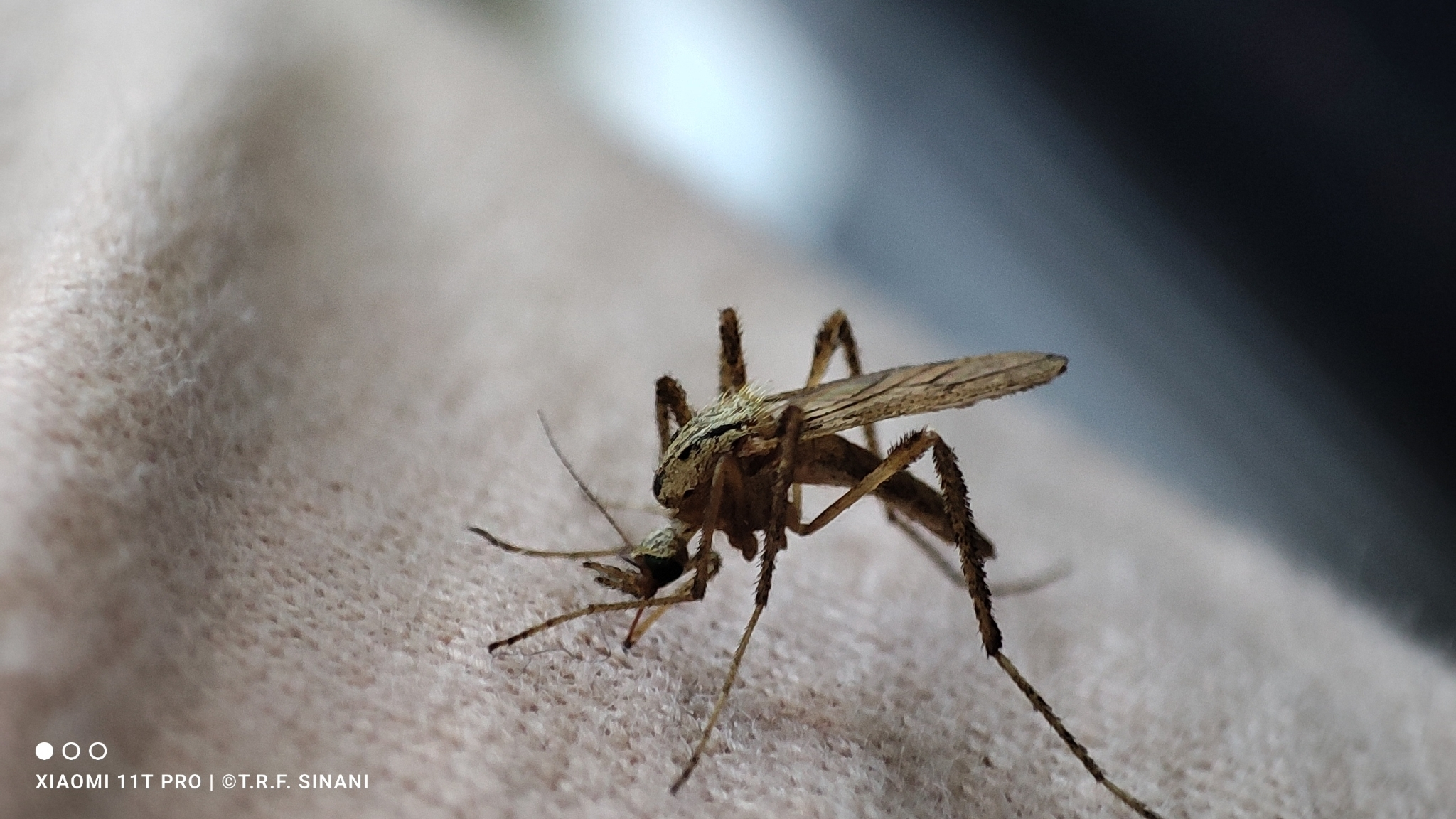
P. pallescens

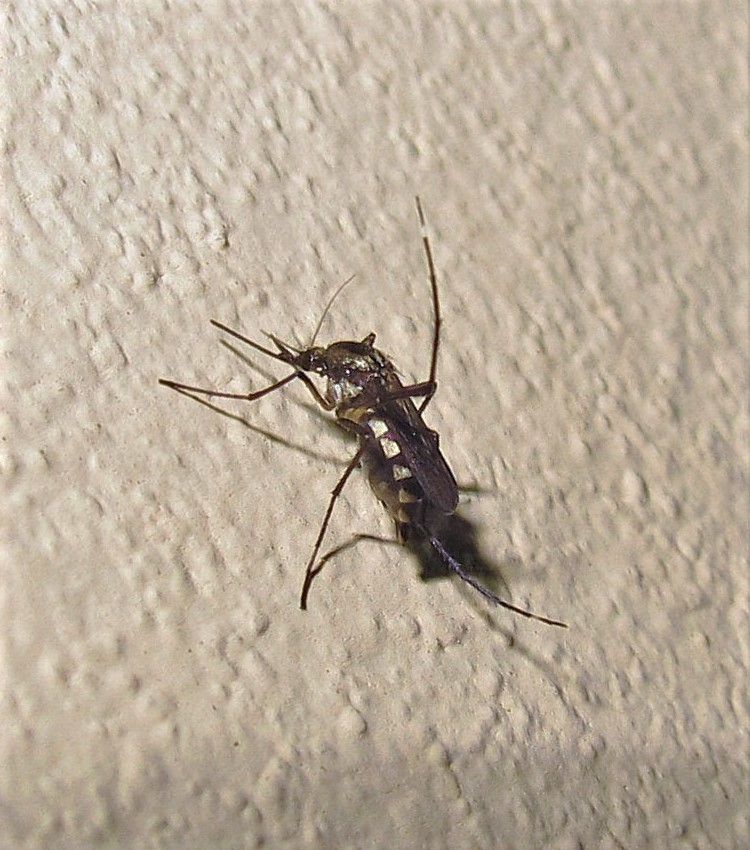
P. albigenu

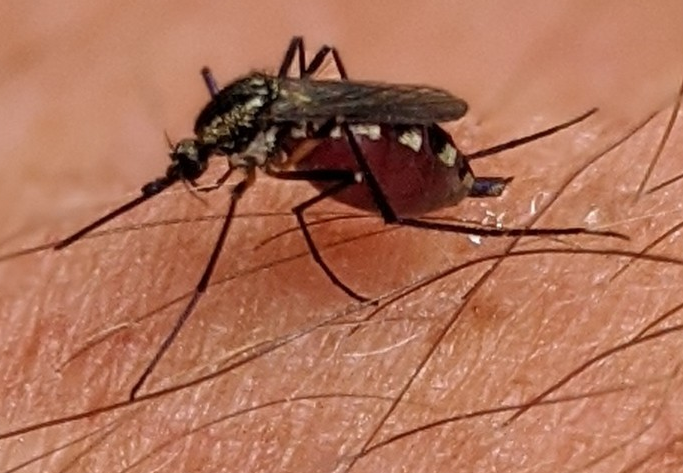
P. mathesoni

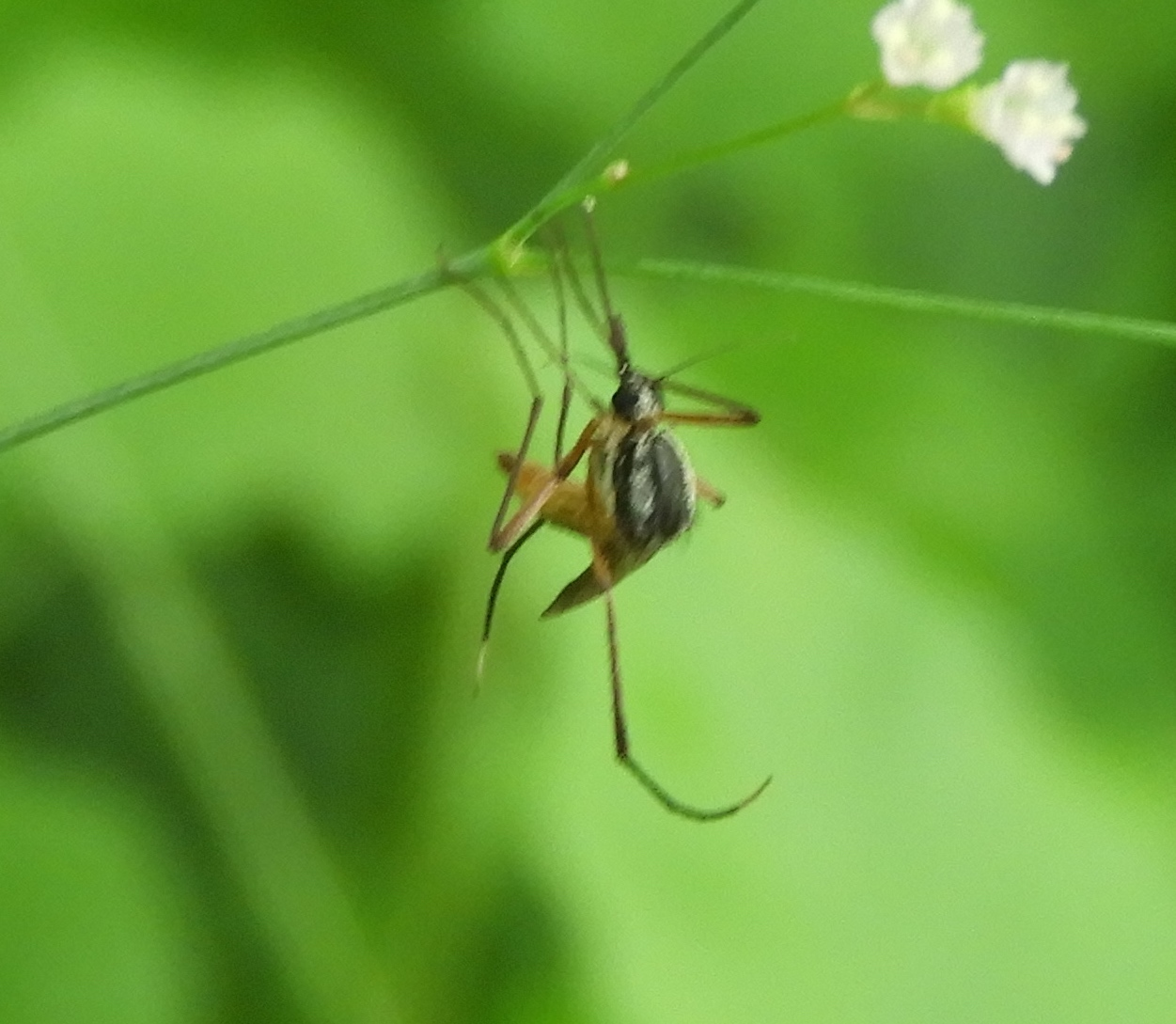
P. albipes

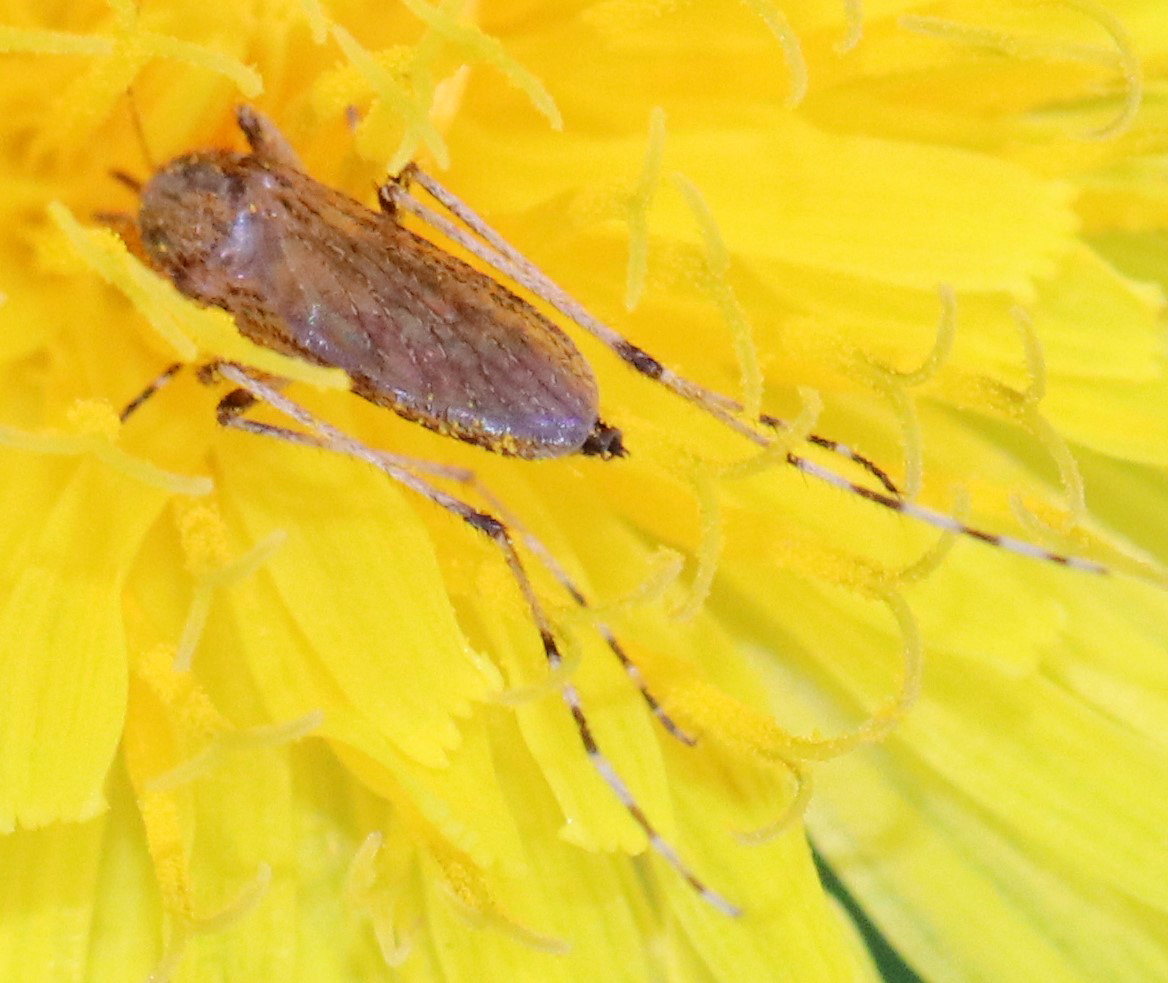
P. discolor
