= Aedes (Scutomyia) =

Scientific classification
- Kingdom: Animalia
- Phylum: Arthropoda
- Class: Insecta
- Order: Diptera
- Family: Culicidae
- Genus: Aedes
- Subgenus: Scutomyia; Theobald, 1904

Subgenus of mosquitoes

Scutomyia is a subgenus of Aedes.

== Species ==
- Aedes albolineatus (Theobald, 1904)
- Aedes arboricolus Knight and Rozeboom, 1946
- Aedes bambusicolus Knight and Rozeboom, 1946
- Aedes boharti Knight and Rozeboom, 1946
- Aedes hoogstraali Knight and Rozeboom, 1946
- Aedes impatibilis (Walker, 1859)
- Aedes laffooni Knight and Rozeboom, 1946
- Aedes platylepidus Knight and Hull, 1951
- Aedes pseudoalbolineatus Brug, 1939
