= Kompia (subgenus) =

Scientific classification
- Domain: Eukaryota
- Kingdom: Animalia
- Phylum: Arthropoda
- Class: Insecta
- Order: Diptera
- Family: Culicidae
- Genus: Aedes
- Subgenus: Kompia; Aitken, 1941

Subgenus of insects

Kompia is a subgenus of the mosquito genus Aedes.

== Species ==
- Aedes purpureipes Aitken, 1941
