= Rampa Rattanarithikul =

Thai entomologist

Rampa Rattanarithikul (Thai: รำภา รัตนฤทธิกุล; born 1939) is a Thai entomologist and taxonomist. She is a leading expert on mosquitoes, having discovered 24 new species and identifying at least 420 during her career. She was the lead author of the six-volume Illustrated Keys to the Mosquitoes of Thailand. The mosquito species Anopheles rampae and Uranotaenia rampae are named for her.

== Career ==
Rattanarithikul started her career as a lab technician in 1959 for a malaria mosquito research project of the Southeast Asia Treaty Organization (SEATO). She directed lab assistants in making preliminary identifications of specimens, mounting and labelling them, and maintaining records. Through SEATO, she worked as a taxonomist for the Smithsonian Institution's mosquito collection during the summer of 1965. By the early 1970s, she had become a senior laboratory technician. She then worked as a medical entomologist with the Armed Forces Research Institute of Medical Sciences (AFRIMS). With AFRIMS, she studies vector species and maintains a mosquito collection at the AFRIMS museum in Bangkok.

She studied medical entomology and Japanese in Kobe University in Japan, earning her doctorate in 1996.

Specimens that Rattanarithikul have collected number in the hundreds of thousands. Many of her specimens were sent to the Walter Reed Biosystematics Unit at the Smithsonian Institution, and her contributions account for as much as half of their 1.5 million specimens. During her career, she discovered 24 new species and identified at least 420 species of mosquito.

Rattanarithikul is the lead author of the Illustrated Keys to the Mosquitoes of Thailand, a six-volume work detailing the distribution and characteristics of mosquitoes in Thailand. It was published by The Southeast Asian Journal of Tropical Medicine and Public Health in 2006. She has also consulted for a project to develop a national entomology collection for Thailand at the Queen Sirikit Botanical Garden.

== Awards and honours ==
Rattanarithikul was presented with the American Mosquito Control Association's John N. Belkin Memorial Award in 2011 for "meritorious contributions to the field of mosquito systematics and/or biology".

Two species of mosquito are named after Rattanarithikul, the Rampa Thai Nail Mosquito (Anopheles rampae) and Uranotaenia rampae. The subgenus Rampamyia is also named for her.

== Personal life ==
Rattanarithikul lives in Chiang Mai. Her husband is Manop Rattanarithikul, a lawyer and malaria expert.

She founded the Museum of World Insects and Natural Wonders in Chiang Mai with her husband in 1999. The museum serves as a cabinet of curiosities for their collection of fossils, petrified wood, stones, and carvings as well as insect species. The museum has 10,000 species from 315 genera.

== Selected publications ==
- Rattanarithikul, Rampa; Green, C.A. (1987). "Formal recognition of the species of the Anopheles maculatus group (Diptera: Culicidae) occurring in Thailand, including the descriptions of two new species and a preliminary key to females" (PDF). Mosquito Systematics. 18 (3–4): 246–278.
- Rattanarithikul, R; Harrison, BA; Panthusiri, P; Coleman, RE (2005). "Illustrated keys to the mosquitoes of Thailand I. Background; geographic distribution; lists of genera, subgenera, and species; and a key to the genera". The Southeast Asian Journal of Tropical Medicine and Public Health. 36 (Suppl 1): 1–80. PMID 15916030.
- Harbach, Ralph E.; Rattanarithikul, Rampa; Harrison, Bruce A. (21 February 2017). "Anopheles prachongae, a new species of the Gigas Complex of subgenus Anopheles (Diptera: Culicidae) in Thailand, contrasted with known forms of the complex". Zootaxa. 4236 (1): 65. doi:10.11646/zootaxa.4236.1.3. hdl:10141/622190. PMID 28264338.
