= Armigeres =

Scientific classification
- Kingdom: Animalia
- Phylum: Arthropoda
- Clade: Pancrustacea
- Class: Insecta
- Order: Diptera
- Family: Culicidae
- Genus: Armigeres; Theobald, 1901

Genus of mosquitoes

Armigeres is a genus of mosquito belonging to the family Culicidae. Certain species of Armigeres within this genus have the ability to raise their hindlegs and create an egg raft, which they use to transport and deposit eggs onto the water's surface.

Species of Armigeres are found in Southeastern Asia and Northern Australia.

Species:

- Armigeres alkatirii (Toma, Miyagi & Syafruddin, 1995)
- Armigeres annulipalpis (Theobald, 1910)
- Armigeres annulitarsis (Leicester, 1908)
- Armigeres apoensis (Bohart & Farner, 1944)
- Armigeres aureolineatus (Leicester, 1908)
- Armigeres azurini (Basio, 1971)
- Armigeres baisasi (Stone & Thurman, 1958)
- Armigeres balteatus (Macdonald, 1960)
- Armigeres bhayungi (Thurman & Thurman, 1958)
- Armigeres breinli (Taylor, 1914)
- Armigeres candelabrifer (Brug, 1939)
- Armigeres chrysocorporis (Hsieh & Liao, 1956)
- Armigeres cingulata (Leicester, 1908)
- Armigeres confusus (Edwards, 1915)
- Armigeres conjungens (Edwards, 1914)
- Armigeres denbesteni (Brug, 1925)
- Armigeres dentatus (Barraud, 1927)
- Armigeres digitatus (Edwards, 1914)
- Armigeres dolichocephalus (Leicester, 1908)
- Armigeres durhami (Edwards, 1917)
- Armigeres ejercitoi (Baisas, 1935)
- Armigeres fimbriatus (Edwards, 1930)
- Armigeres flavus (Leicester, 1908)
- Armigeres foliatus (Brug, 1931)
- Armigeres giveni (Edwards, 1926)
- Armigeres hybridus (Edwards, 1914)
- Armigeres inchoatus (Barraud, 1927)
- Armigeres joloensis (Ludlow, 1904)
- Armigeres jugraensis (Leicester, 1908)
- Armigeres kesseli (Ramalingam, 1987)
- Armigeres kinabaluensis (Ramalingam, 1972)
- Armigeres kuchingensis (Edwards, 1915)
- Armigeres lacuum (Edwards, 1922)
- Armigeres laoensis (Toma & Miyagi, 2003)
- Armigeres lepidocoxitus (Dong, Zhou & Dong, 1995)
- Armigeres longipalpis (Leicester, 1904)
- Armigeres magnus (Theobald, 1908)
- Armigeres maiae (Edwards, 1917)
- Armigeres malayi (Theobald, 1901)
- Armigeres manalangi (Baisas, 1935)
- Armigeres maximus (Edwards, 1922)
- Armigeres menglaensis (Dong Xueshu, Zhou Hongning & Dong Limin, 2002)
- Armigeres milnensis (Lee, 1944)
- Armigeres moultoni (Edwards, 1914)
- Armigeres obturbans (Walker, 1859)
- Armigeres omissus (Edwards, 1914)
- Armigeres pallithorax (Dong, Zhou & Dong, 2004)
- Armigeres papuensis (Peters, 1963)
- Armigeres pectinatus (Edwards, 1914)
- Armigeres pendulus (Edwards, 1914)
- Armigeres sembeli (Toma & Miyagi, 2002)
- Armigeres seticoxitus (Luh & Li, 1981)
- Armigeres setifer (Delfinado, 1966)
- Armigeres subalbatus (Coquillett, 1898)
- Armigeres theobaldi (Barradu, 1934)
- Armigeres traubi (Macdonald, 1960)
- Armigeres vimoli (Thurman & Thurman, 1958)
- Armigeres yunnanensis (Dong, Zhou & Dong, 1995)
