= Phinizy Swamp Nature Park =

Nature park in Augusta, Georgia, US

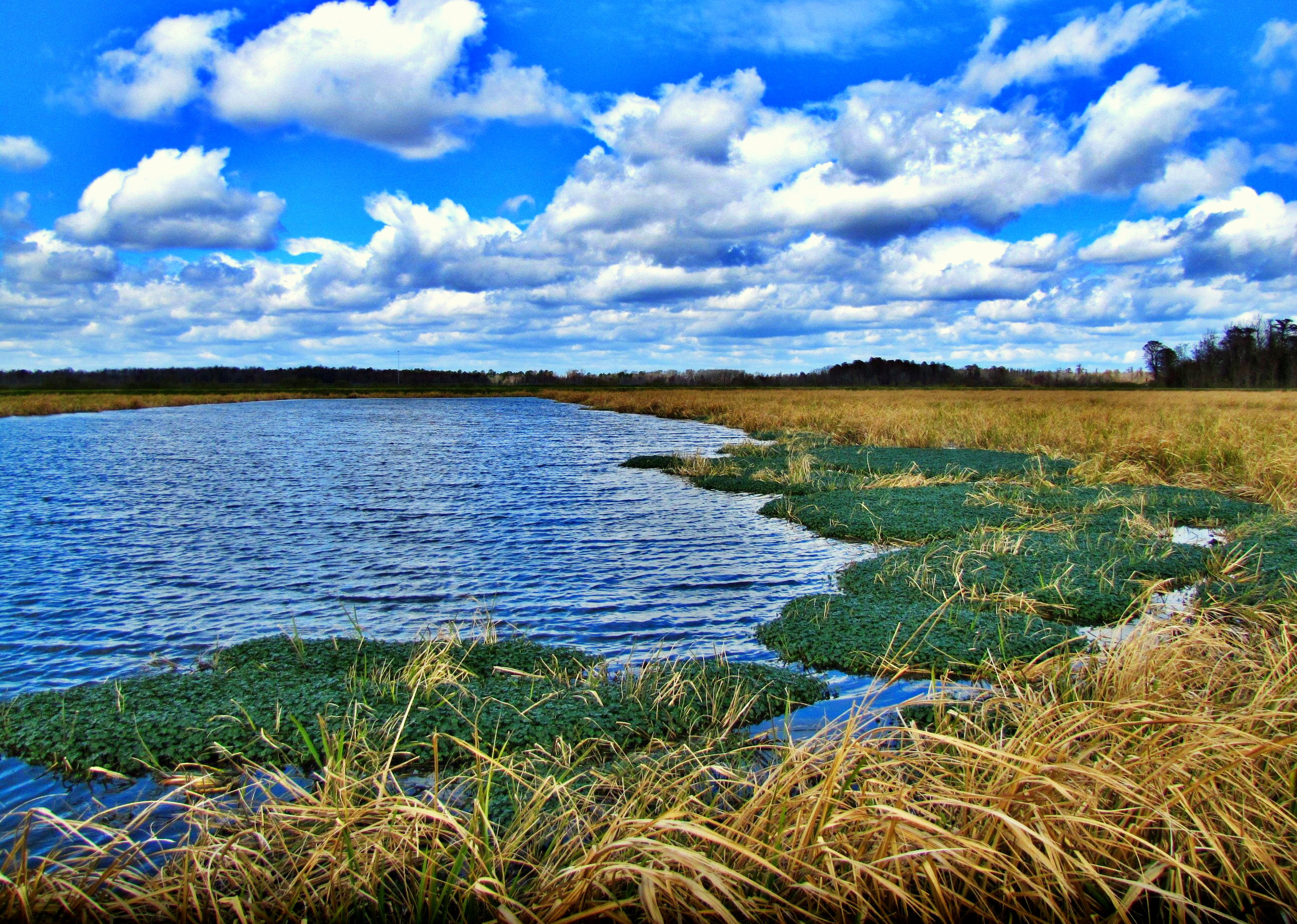
- Phinizy Swamp Floodplain

- Location within Georgia
- Location: Augusta, Georgia
- Coordinates: 33°23′25″N 81°57′31″W
- Area: 1,100 acres (450 ha)
- Governing body: Phinizy Center for Water Sciences
- Website: phinizycenter.org

Phinizy Swamp Nature Park is a 1,100-acre (450 ha) nature park in Augusta, Georgia. The park contains wetlands and woodlands and has a campus for water research and environmental education, which includes a visitor center. It has many bald cypresses draped in Spanish moss and forests of loblolly trees. Birds commonly found at Phinizy Swamp include: red-shouldered hawks, great blue herons, sora, wood ducks and bald eagles. Sometimes the park yields rarities for Georgia, including black-bellied whistling ducks, which nested in the park in 2010, and a cave swallow, in 2004.

== History ==
As part of a floodplain of the Savannah River, the area known as Phinizy Swamp is a 7,000-acre (2,800 ha) natural wetland created by the confluence of Butler Creek and the Savannah River. The swamp derives its name from Victor Francois Phinizy and his family, who owned a homestead on the land, first settling in 1778. During the 19th and 20th centuries, the wetlands were converted to farm fields and cattle pastures, and in the 1950s and 60s they were part of a beef farm for the Gracewood state-run mental health institution. In 1973, the city of Augusta acquired the land, but it remained unused until 1993, when the city was ordered to update its wastewater treatment system. The city decided to restore the site to a wetlands ecosystem and use it as a tertiary treatment stage for water from the nearby wastewater treatment plant. As part of the construction of the wetlands, the city also established the Southeastern Natural Sciences Academy, which later became the Phinizy Center for Water Sciences.

== Wildlife ==
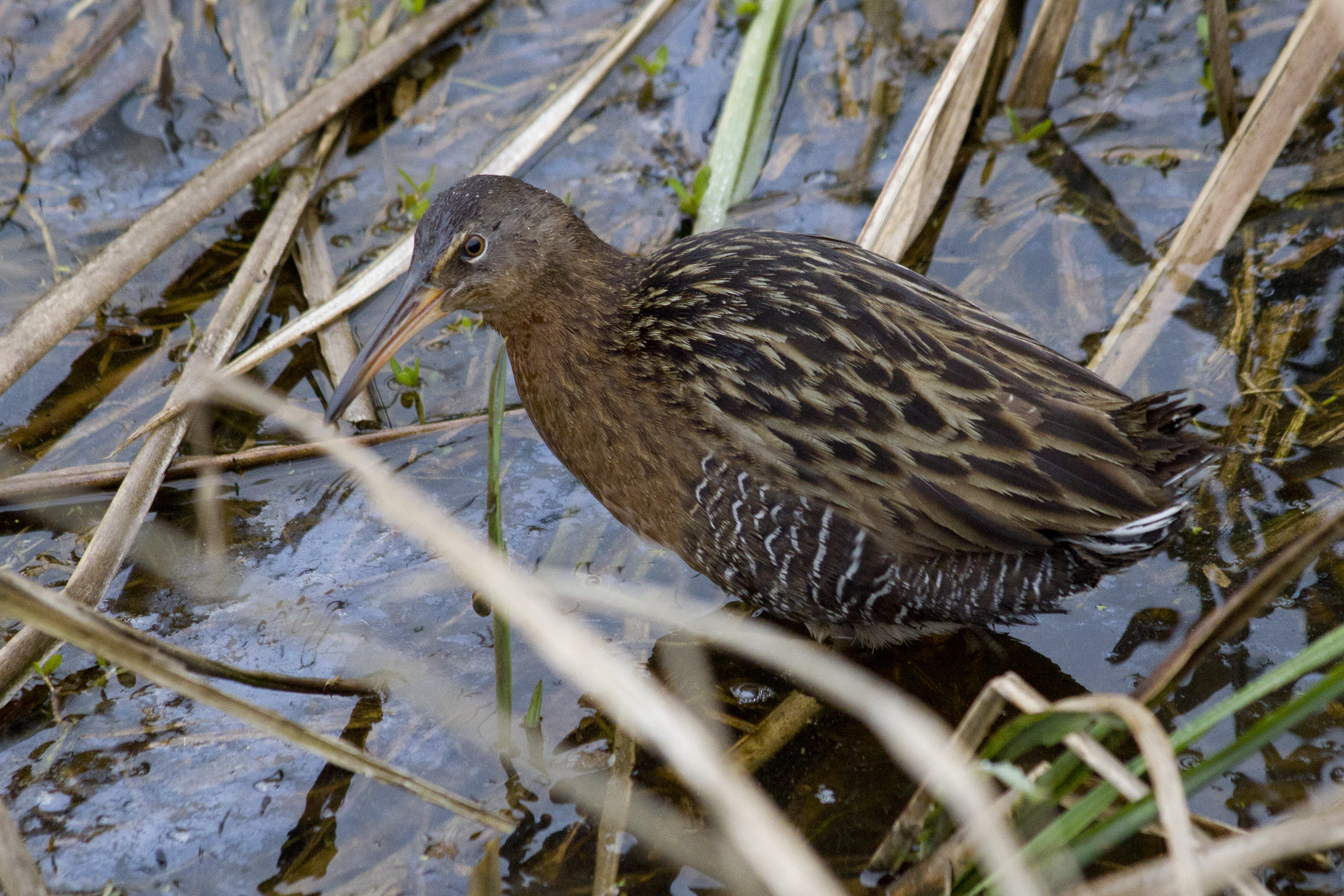
Close views of King Rails are one of the main draws for birders visiting Phinizy Swamp Nature Park.

Phinizy Swamp is designated an Important Bird Area by BirdLife International and hosts over 240 species of birds.

Arthropod diversity is also high, with many odonate species occupying the wetland cells. Mosquitoes are abundant at dusk, predominantly Culex salinarius. Both Uranotaenia sapphirina and lowii have been documented here.
