= Uranotaenia campestris =

Scientific classification
- Domain: Eukaryota
- Kingdom: Animalia
- Phylum: Arthropoda
- Class: Insecta
- Order: Diptera
- Family: Culicidae
- Tribe: Uranotaeniini
- Genus: Uranotaenia
- Subgenus: Uranotaenia
- Species: U. campestris

Binomial name
- Uranotaenia campestris Leicester, 1908

Synonyms
- Uranotaenia callithotrys Dyar, 1908

Species of mosquito

Uranotaenia (Uranotaenia) campestris is a species of mosquito belonging to the genus Uranotaenia. It is found in Thailand, Sri Lanka, Bangladesh, Cambodia, India, Indonesia, Malaysia, Nepal, Timor, and Vietnam.
