= Uranotaenia rutherfordi =

Scientific classification
- Domain: Eukaryota
- Kingdom: Animalia
- Phylum: Arthropoda
- Class: Insecta
- Order: Diptera
- Family: Culicidae
- Tribe: Uranotaeniini
- Genus: Uranotaenia
- Subgenus: Uranotaenia
- Species: U. rutherfordi

Binomial name
- Uranotaenia rutherfordi Edwards, 1922

Species of mosquito

Uranotaenia (Uranotaenia) rutherfordi is a species of zoophilic mosquito belonging to the genus Uranotaenia. It is endemic to Sri Lanka, and first documented from Peradeniya.
