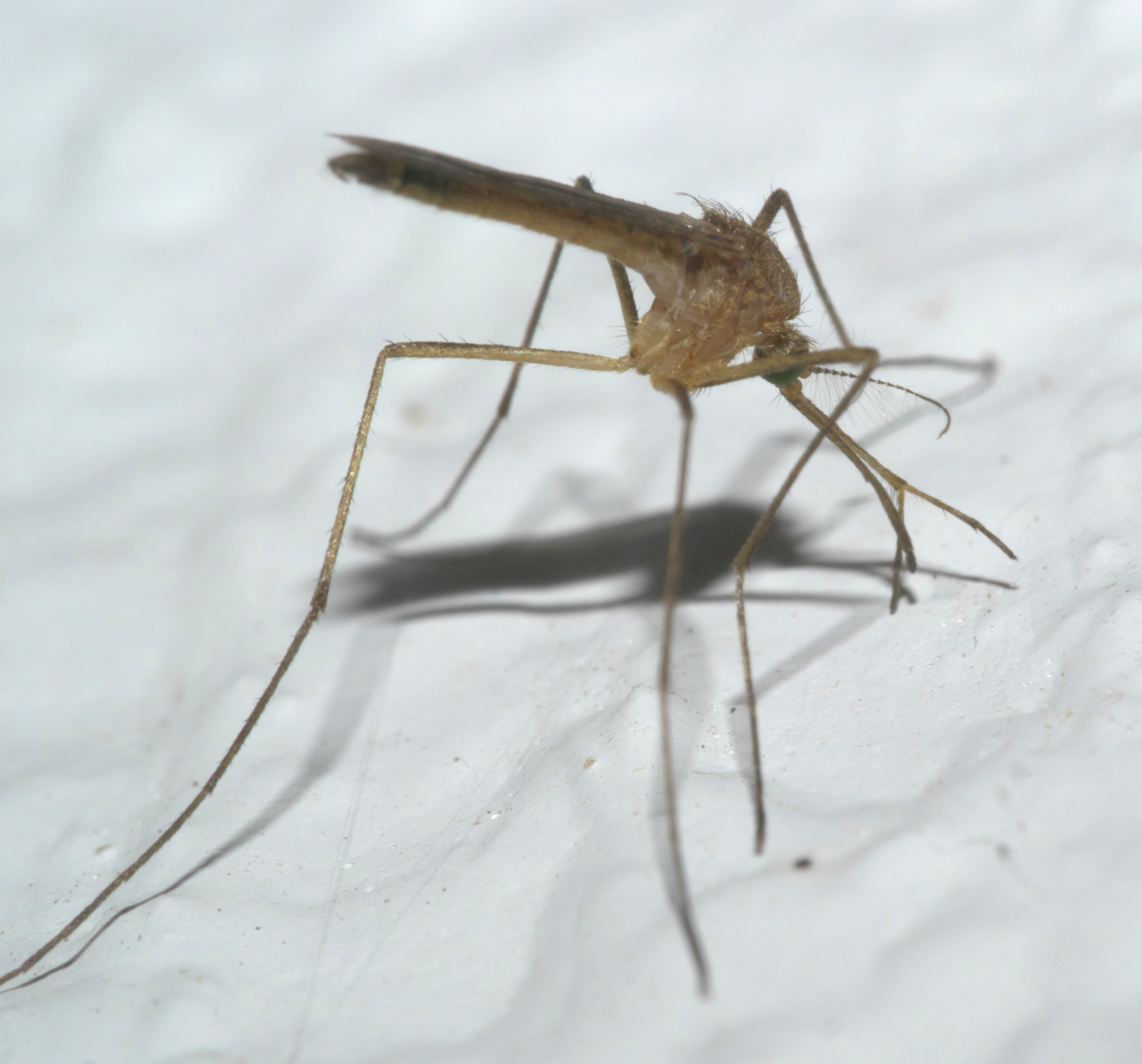
- Male Culiseta melanura, Oklahoma

Scientific classification
- Kingdom: Animalia
- Phylum: Arthropoda
- Clade: Pancrustacea
- Class: Insecta
- Order: Diptera
- Family: Culicidae
- Genus: Culiseta
- Species: C. melanura

Binomial name
- Culiseta melanura (Coquillett, 1902)

Synonyms
- Culex melanurus Coquillett, 1902

= Culiseta melanura =

Species of fly

Culiseta melanura, the black-tailed mosquito, is a species of mosquito in the family Culicidae. It is found mainly in the eastern and central United States. Adults are dark brown in color, with few markings. The proboscis of the adult female is long and curved.

Adult female C. melanura primarily take their blood meals from birds and are responsible for transmitting the eastern equine encephalitis virus between birds. Mammals can also become infected with the virus when other genera of mosquito, such as Aedes, Coquillettidia, and Culex, take blood meals first from infected birds and then from mammals, transferring the virus through their bite.

== Parasites ==
C. melanura is the principal enzootic vector of Eastern equine encephalitis virus. Scott & Lorez 1998 find EEEV vector infection is not benign, reducing C. melanura lifespan.
