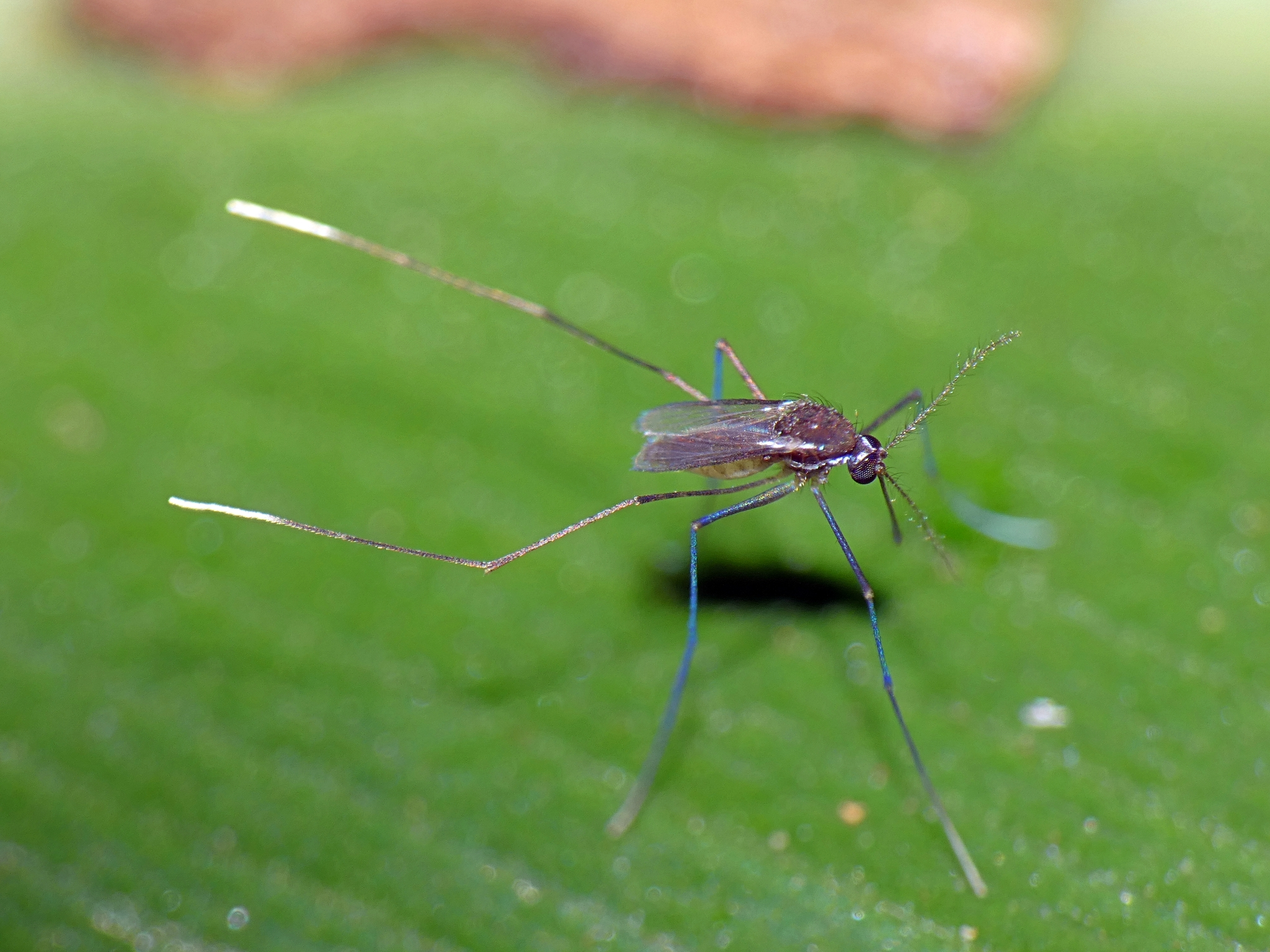

Scientific classification
- Domain: Eukaryota
- Kingdom: Animalia
- Phylum: Arthropoda
- Class: Insecta
- Order: Diptera
- Family: Culicidae
- Genus: Uranotaenia
- Subgenus: Uranotaenia
- Species: U. lateralis

Binomial name
- Uranotaenia lateralis Ludlow, 1905

Synonyms
- Uranotaenia cairnsensis Taylor; Uranotaenia cancer Leicester; Uranotaenia ceylonica Theobald; Uranotaenia propria Taylor

= Uranotaenia lateralis =

Species of mosquito

Uranotaenia lateralis is a species of zoophilic mosquito in the family Culicidae. It is found in Thailand, Sri Lanka, Japan, Australia, China, Indonesia, Malaysia, New Guinea, Papua New Guinea, Philippines, Solomon Islands, Thailand, Timor, and Vietnam. They are known to live in crab holes, prefer to live around banks of water pools and are known to feed on mudskippers.
