= Usutu =

Usutu may refer to:

- A character in Heroes, see List of Heroes characters#Usutu
- Usutu River, a name for Maputo River
- Usutu virus, a Flavivirus
