= Coquillettidia adamowiczi =

Scientific classification
- Kingdom: Animalia
- Phylum: Arthropoda
- Class: Insecta
- Order: Diptera
- Family: Culicidae
- Genus: Coquillettidia
- Species: †C. adamowiczi

Binomial name
- †Coquillettidia adamowiczi Szadziewski, Sontag et Szwedo, 2019

Extinct species of mosquito

Coquillettidia adamowiczi is an extinct species of mosquito within the genus Coquillettidia. It lived between 33.9 and 40.4 million years ago, in the Cenozoic and Late Eocene. It is named after Pawel Adamowicz, the mayor of Gdańsk.

The sole male specimen was found preserved in Baltic amber with a body length of 6.4 mm. It is possible that C. adamowiczi was a vector of avian malaria.
