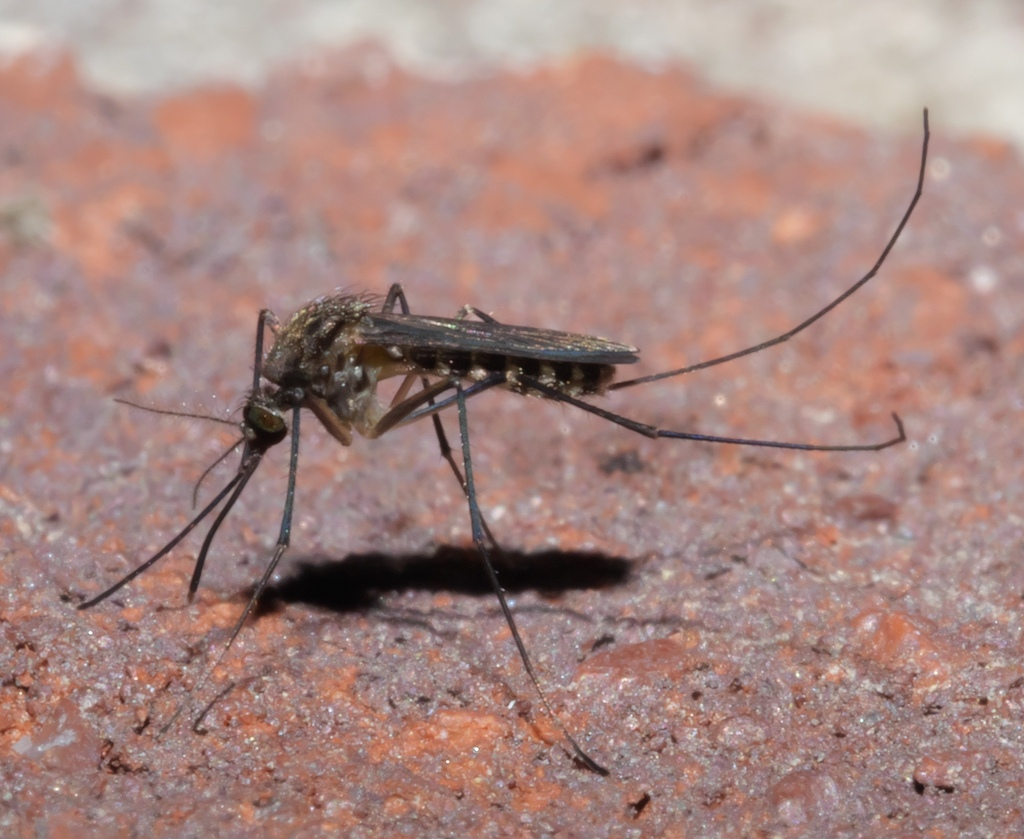

Scientific classification
- Kingdom: Animalia
- Phylum: Arthropoda
- Class: Insecta
- Order: Diptera
- Family: Culicidae
- Genus: Culex
- Species: C. erraticus

Binomial name
- Culex erraticus (Dyar & Knab, 1906)

Synonyms
- Culex degustator Dyar, 1921; Culex egberti Dyar and Knab, 1907; Culex homoepas Dyar and Ludlow, 1921; Culex peribleptus Dyar and Knab, 1918; Culex pose Dyar and Knab, 1918; Mochlostyrax erraticus Dyar and Knab, 1906

= Culex erraticus =

Species of mosquito

Culex erraticus, which translates in English to Erratic Mosquito, is a species of mosquito in the family Culicidae. It is widespread in Florida, but rare in the northeastern United States. The mosquito ranges in the north from Connecticut and Ontario, west to Nebraska, and south to Mexico, Central America, and South America. In addition, it is found in southernmost California.

The females can be aggressive biters. They take blood meals from birds, mammals, amphibians, and reptiles. The mosquito is frequently infected with the virus EEEV, and may be a public health concern for its potential to transmit this arbovirus to people.

Culex erraticus mosquitoes lay eggs in floating clusters called “egg rafts” on the edges of aquatic plant leaves. Examples of aquatic plants that they have been found to lay eggs on include Eichhornia crassipes, Salvinia molesta, Salvinia minima, and Lemna minor.

These mosquitoes are known overwinter in gopher tortoise burrows from October through February in Central Florida.
