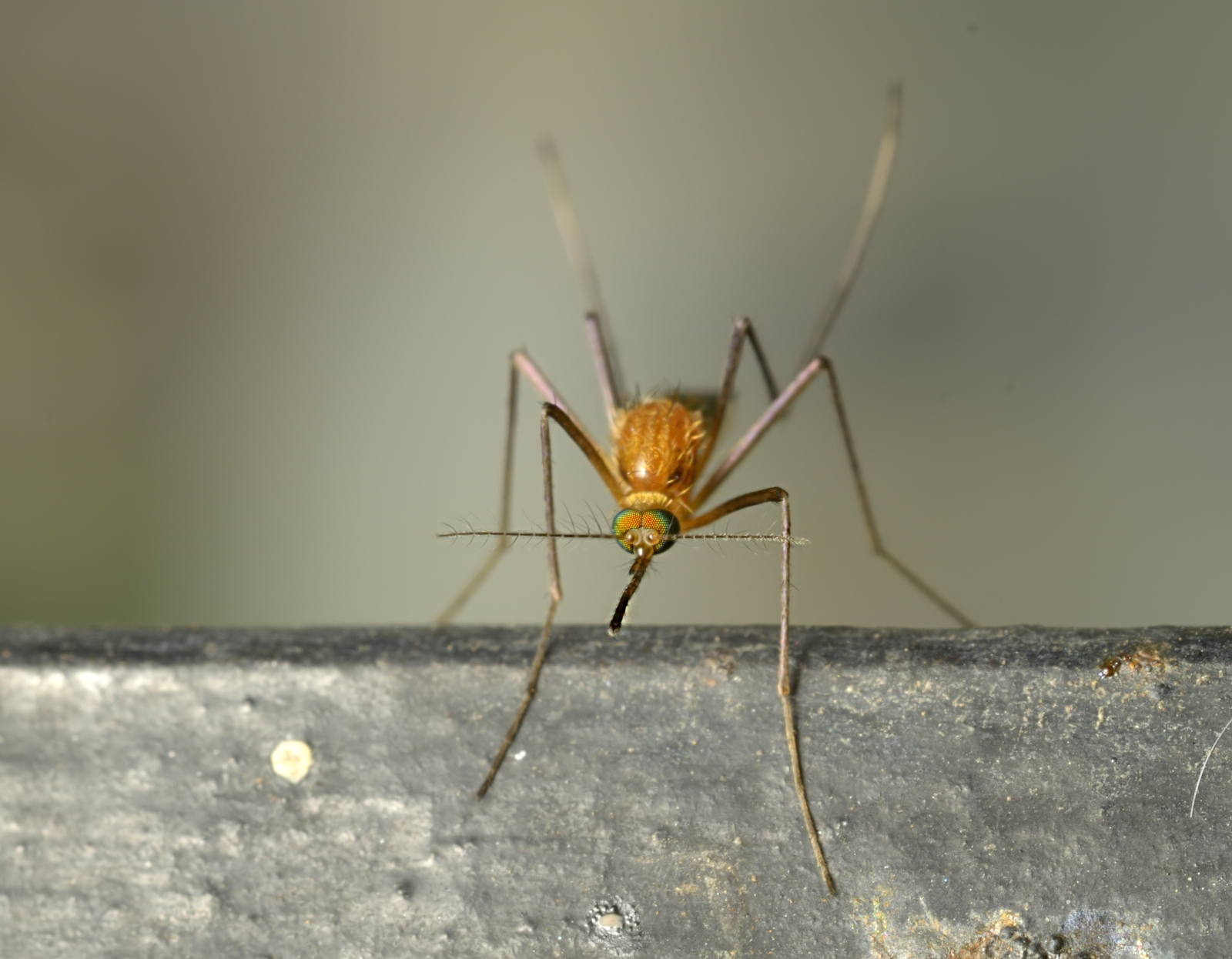

Scientific classification
- Kingdom: Animalia
- Phylum: Arthropoda
- Class: Insecta
- Order: Diptera
- Family: Culicidae
- Genus: Coquillettidia
- Subgenus: Coquillettidia
- Species: C. crassipes

Binomial name
- Coquillettidia crassipes (Wulp, 1881)

Synonyms
- Chrysoconops pygmaeus Theobald, 1908; Mansonia diaeretus Dyar, 1920; Taeniorhynchus brevicellulus Theobald, 1901; Mansonia crassipes

= Coquillettidia crassipes =

Species of insect

Coquillettidia (Coquillettidia) crassipes is a species complex of zoophilic mosquito belonging to the genus Coquillettidia.

== Distribution ==
It has a wide range of distribution from west to east. It is found in Sri Lanka, Australia, Bangladesh, Cambodia, China, Fiji, Guam, Hong Kong, India, Indonesia, Japan, Laos, Malaysia, Mariana Islands, Myanmar, Nepal, New Guinea (Island); Papua New Guinea, Pakistan, Philippines, Thailand, Vietnam, Ryukyu, Irian Jaya, and Maluku.

== Description ==
Female with brownish antenna, maxillary palpus, clypeus, and proboscis with violet sheen. Scutum yellowish, with narrow golden scales. Wings with narrow dark scales of purple reflections. Femora yellowish at base and purplish on apical parts. Male has maxillary palpus longer than proboscis.

== Parasites ==
Niles et al 1965 finds C. crassipes to be a natural vector of Plasmodium gallinaceum. It also vectors various other avian malaria organisms in Africa.

== Medical importance ==
It is a secondary vector of Brugian filariasis, a host to Cardofilaria nilesi.
