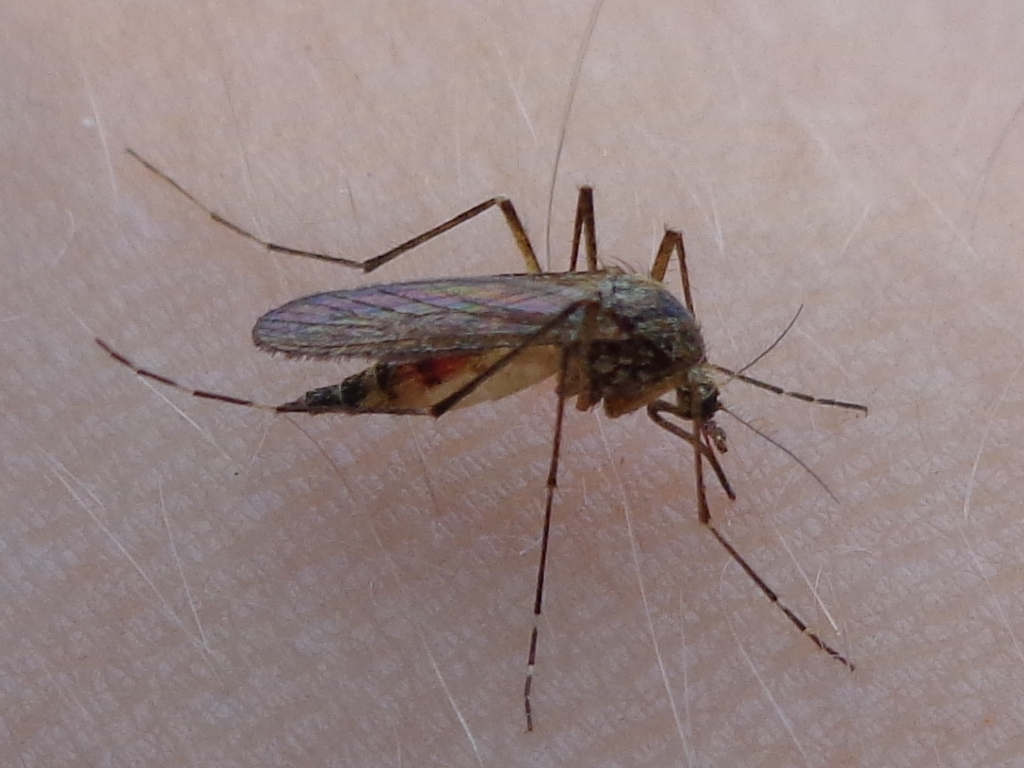
- Coquillettidia richiardii

Scientific classification
- Kingdom: Animalia
- Phylum: Arthropoda
- Clade: Pancrustacea
- Class: Insecta
- Order: Diptera
- Family: Culicidae
- Genus: Coquillettidia; Dyar, 1904

Species
- See article.

= Coquillettidia =

Genus of flies

Coquillettidia is a mosquito genus erected by entomologist Harrison Gray Dyar Jr. in 1904 based primarily on unique features of its "peculiar" male genitalia. The genus name honors Dyar's colleague Daniel William Coquillett.

The genus comprises three subgenera, Austromansonia, Coquillettidia, and Rhynochotaenia, and 57 species, of which Coquillettidia perturbans is perhaps the best known.

== Bionomics ==
Not all species have been well documented, but females of some are known to feed primarily on birds but will also bite cattle. The females bite primarily at night, and are most active during the early part of the night. They occasionally attack humans during daylight hours in shady places when their habitat is entered.

Adult females lay their eggs on the surface of water in areas of emergent vegetation to which hatchling larvae attach themselves with a modified siphon, on the roots or submerged stems, and where they remain throughout development; pupae also attach themselves the plants by means of a modified respiratory trumpet, and remain there until the adult is ready to emerge.

Species in the subgenus Coquillettidia are primarily Afrotropical, but some are found in the Asian and Australasian Regions, one occurs in North America and two occur in the Palearctic region. Austromansonia occurs only in New Zealand, while species of subgenus Rhynchotaenia are confined to the Neotropical Region.

== Medical importance ==
Coquillettidia perturbans is considered a vector of eastern equine encephalitis; other species are secondary or suspected vectors of Brugia malayi the cause of lymphatic filariasis, and Rift Valley fever.

Coquillettidia venezuelensis transmits Oropouche virus, the cause of Oropouche fever.

== Species ==
=== Subgenus (Coquillettidia) Dyar, 1905 ===
- †Coquillettidia adamowiczi Szadziewski, Sontag et Szwedo, 2019
- Coquillettidia annettii Theobald, 1901
- Coquillettidia aurata Dobrotworsky, 1962
- Coquillettidia aurea Edwards, 1915
- Coquillettidia aureosquammata Ludlow, 1909
- Coquillettidia aurites Theobald, 1901
- Coquillettidia buxtoni Edwards, 1923
- Coquillettidia chrysosoma Edwards, 1915
- Coquillettidia crassipes van der Wulp, 1881
- Coquillettidia cristata Theobald, 1904
- Coquillettidia fijiensis Belkin, 1962
- Coquillettidia flavocincta Edwards, 1936
- Coquillettidia fraseri Theobald, 1911
- Coquillettidia fuscopennata Theobald, 1903
- Coquillettidia fuscopteron Theobald, 1911
- †Coquillettidia gedanica Szadziewski, Sontag et Szwedo, 2019
- Coquillettidia giblini Taylor, 1914
- Coquillettidia grandidieri Blanchard, 1905
- Coquillettidia hodgkini Wharton, 1962
- Coquillettidia iracunda Walker, 1848

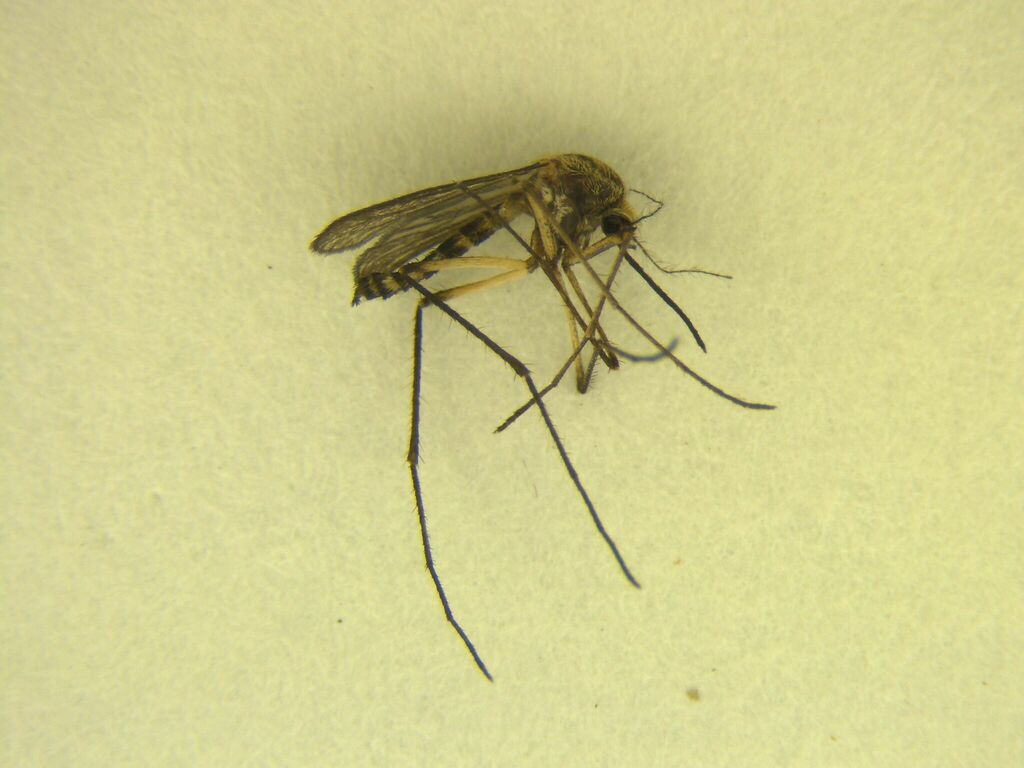
C. iracuda

- Coquillettidia karandalaensis Wolfs, 1951
- Coquillettidia linealis Skuse, 1889
- Coquillettidia lutea Belkin, 1962
- Coquillettidia maculipennis Theo đóbald, 1911
- Coquillettidia memorans Bonne-Wepster, 1930
- Coquillettidia metallica Theobald, 1901
- Coquillettidia microannulata Theobald, 1911
- Coquillettidia nigritarsis Wolfs, 1958
- Coquillettidia nigrithorax Theobald, 1910
- Coquillettidia nigrochracea Bonne-Wepster, 1930
- Coquillettidia nigrosignata Edwards, 1917
- Coquillettidia novochracea Barraud, 1927
- Coquillettidia ochracea Theobald, 1903
- Coquillettidia perturbans Walker, 1856
- Coquillettidia pseudoconopas Theobald, 1910
- Coquillettidia richiardii Ficalbi, 1889
- Coquillettidia rochei Doucet, 1951
- Coquillettidia samoaensis Stone, 1966
- Coquillettidia saotomensis Lien, Lin, Lin and Tseng, 2008
- Coquillettidia schoutedeni Wolfs, 1948
- Coquillettidia vanoyei Wolfs, 1948
- Coquillettidia variegata Dobrotworsky, 1962
- Coquillettidia versicolor Edwards, 1913
- Coquillettidia voltaensis Danilov, 1982
- Coquillettidia wahlbergi Edwards, 1936
- Coquillettidia xanthogaster Edwards, 1924

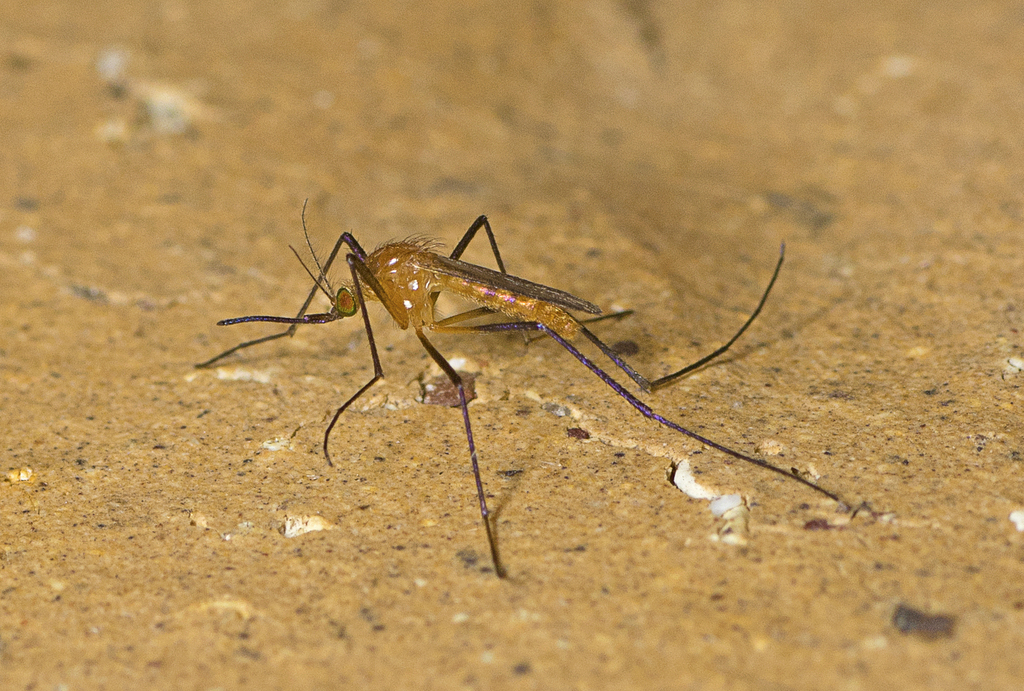
C. xanthogaster

=== Subgenus (Austromansonia) Belkin, 1968 ===
- Coquillettidia tenuipalpis (Edwards, 1924)

=== Subgenus (Rhynchotaenia) Brèthes, 1910 ===
- Coquillettidia albicosta Chagas in Peryassú, 1908
- Coquillettidia albifera Prado, 1931
- Coquillettidia arribalzagae Theobald, 1903
- Coquillettidia chrysonotum Peryassú, 1922

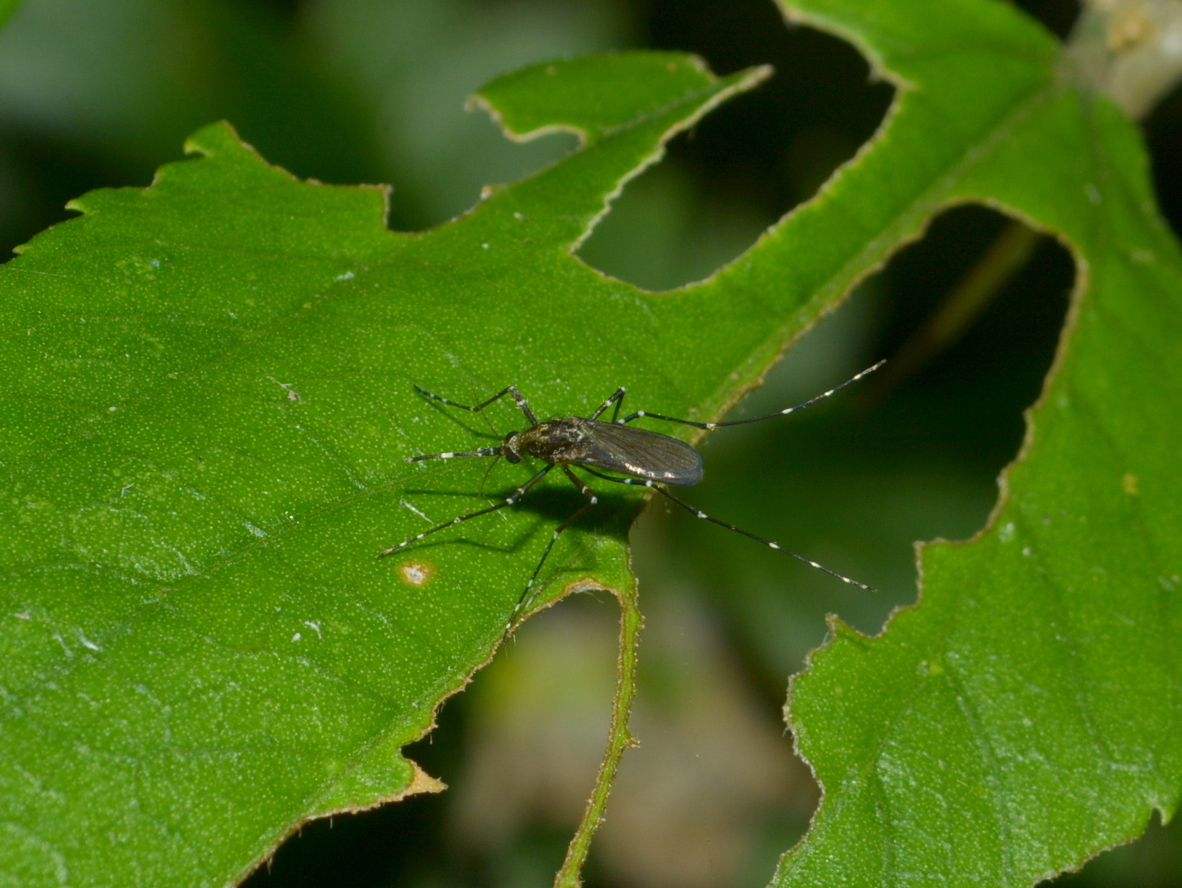
C. chrysonotum

- Coquillettidia fasciolata Lynch Arribálzaga, 1891
- Coquillettidia hermanoi Lane and Coutinho, 1940
- Coquillettidia juxtamansonia Chagas, 1907
- Coquillettidia lynchi Shannon, 1931
- Coquillettidia neivai Lane and Coutinho, 1940
- Coquillettidia nigricans Coquillett, 1904
- Coquillettidia nitens Cerqueira, 1943
- Coquillettidia shannoni Lane and Antunes, 1937

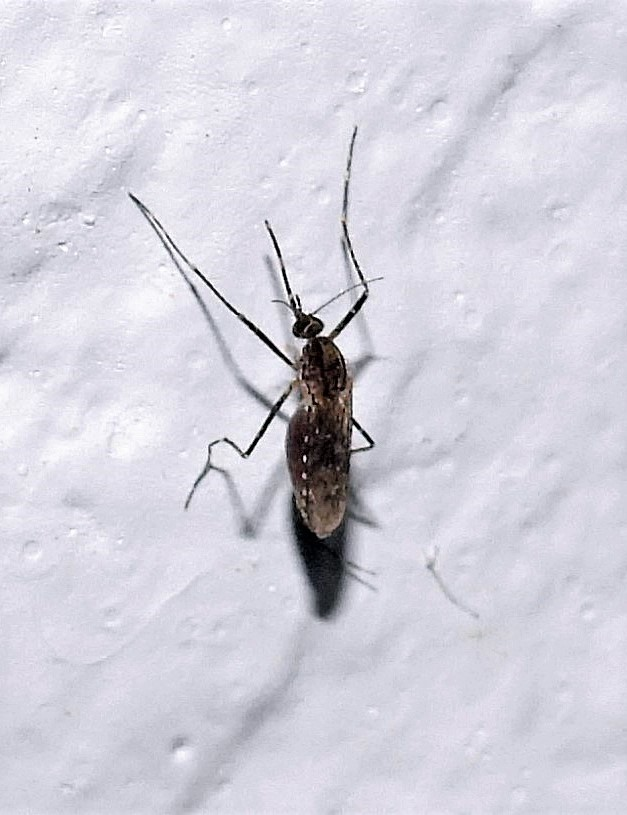
C. shannoni

- Coquillettidia venezuelensis Theobald, 1912

=== Uncertain ===
- †Coquillettidia cockerelli Edwards 1923
- †Coquillettidia martinii (Statz, 1944)
- †Coquillettidia varivestita (Statz, 1944)

== See also ==
- Mosquito control
