= Coquillettidia aurites =

Scientific classification
- Kingdom: Animalia
- Phylum: Arthropoda
- Class: Insecta
- Order: Diptera
- Family: Culicidae
- Genus: Coquillettidia
- Species: C. aurites

Binomial name
- Coquillettidia aurites (Theobald, 1901)

Synonyms
- Mansonia aurites Theobald, 1901

Species of insect

Coquillettidia aurites is a species complex of zoophilic mosquito belonging to the genus Coquillettidia.

== Distribution ==
Coquillettidia aurites has been found in Benin, Kenya, Nigeria, Senegal, South Africa, and Uganda. It has been detected in meadows, forests, and swamps.

== Medical importance ==
It is a vector of Plasmodium, West Nile virus, and Usutu virus, of which was first isolated in Uganda.
