= Eastern equine encephalitis =

Viral disease

- Other names: Triple E, sleeping sickness
- Specialty: Infectious diseases
- Symptoms: fever, headache, altered mental state, nausea, vomiting, fatigue, photophobia, encephalitis, seizures, paralysis
- Complications: coma, death, long-term neurological damage
- Usual onset: 3–10 days after exposure to virus
- Duration: usually a few days
- Causes: Eastern equine encephalitis virus and Madariaga virus
- Risk factors: Age; disease is more severe in young children and the elderly
- Diagnostic method: mainly ELISA of anti-EEEV antibodies and plaque reduction neutralization test
- Prevention: insecticides, larvicides; a vaccine for horses
- Prognosis: often poor; 30–75% case fatality rate depending on age
- Frequency: very rare in typical years; periodic outbreaks

Eastern equine encephalitis (EEE), also called triple E and sleeping sickness, is a viral disease caused mainly by the Eastern equine encephalitis virus (EEEV). Most infections in humans are asymptomatic, but about 5% of the time the infection progresses to severe neuroinvasive disease. Symptoms typically appear 3–10 days after being bitten by an infected mosquito and initially include fever, headache, nausea, vomiting, fatigue, muscle pain, and joint pain. Neurological symptoms usually appear a few days later and include altered mental state, encephalitis, photophobia, seizures, paralysis, and loss of consciousness and coma. The case fatality rate is 30–75% depending on age, with disease severity greatest in young children and the elderly. About 50 to 90% of survivors experience long-term neurological complications that range from minor to severe. EEE is most common in horses, in which the disease carries a 70–90% case fatality rate and permanent brain damage for survivors.

Most human cases are caused by EEEV. Traditionally, four lineages of EEEV were recognized: I, II, III, and IV. Lineage I corresponds to EEEV and the other lineages are classified as a different virus: Madariaga virus (MADV). EEEV is found in North America, the Caribbean, and Central America, and MADV is found in Central America and South America. While both EEEV and MADV cause disease in horses, it is very rare for MADV to cause disease in humans. EEEV and MADV are single-stranded, positive-sense RNA viruses of the genus Alphavirus in the family Togaviridae. Alphaviruses are sorted into Old World alphaviruses and New World alphaviruses, and considered arthritogenic (affecting the joints) or encephalitic (affecting the brain). EEEV and MADV are New World encephalitic alphaviruses. Among encephalitic alphaviruses, EEEV causes the most severe disease in humans.

EEEV is maintained in nature in an enzootic cycle between natural reservoirs of the virus and mosquitos that feed on the blood of those animals. In North America, passerine birds are the main reservoirs of the virus, and Culiseta melanura is the main enzootic vector. In South America, rodents and marsupials may be reservoirs of MADV, and Culex mosquitos of the subgenus Melanoconion are likely the main enzootic vectors. The disease is occasionally transmitted to mammals and other non-reservoir species by other species of mosquitos, called bridge vectors. These mosquitos feed on the blood of both avian and mammalian hosts and include Coquillettidia perturbans and various species of the Aedes, Anopheles, and Culex genera. Humans, horses, and other incidental carriers of EEEV are considered dead-end hosts because they cannot transmit the virus back to mosquitos.

EEE is usually diagnosed by using enzyme-linked immunosorbent assay (ELISA) to test for anti-EEEV antibodies in serum or cerebrospinal fluid. The results of ELISA are then verified with plaque reduction neutralization tests. Other methods such as viral cultures and nucleic acid amplification assays may be used post-mortem. Neuroimaging and electroencephalogram (EEG) tests are useful for identify the severity of disease. There are no specific antiviral drugs used to treat EEE, so treatment is supportive in nature and includes corticosteroids, anti-convulsant drugs, intravenous fluids, tracheal intubation, and fever-reducing drugs. Physical therapy, occupational therapy, and speech therapy are often needed during the recovery process. Prevention methods include insecticides, larvicides, and eliminating mosquito breeding sites. A vaccine that protects against EEEV, but not MADV, is available for horses.

EEE was first recorded during an outbreak in horses in Massachusetts, USA in 1831. EEEV was first isolated from horse brains and linked to EEE during another outbreak in 1933. The first documented human cases were in 1938 in Massachusetts, and isolation from mosquitos first came in 1949 from Cq. perturbans and then in 1951 from Cs. melanura. The disease occurs along the eastern side of the Americas, mainly in the USA in states bordering the Atlantic Ocean, Gulf of Mexico, and Great Lakes. Fewer than ten human cases occur in a typical year, usually in close proximity to hardwood freshwater swamps and marshes where Cs. melanura and other vectors lives. Periodic outbreaks occur in years following years with heavy rainfall, likely due to creating a favorable environment for Cs. melanura. Outbreaks in horses usually precede those in humans, so an increase in cases in horses may be predictive of an upcoming human outbreak.

== Signs and symptoms ==
In most cases, infection with Eastern equine encephalitis virus (EEEV) is self-limiting with no symptoms. In about 5% of cases, though, the virus invades the central nervous system, where it causes Eastern equine encephalitis (EEE), also called triple E or sleeping sickness. This disease is severe and carries with it a high likelihood of death or long-term neurological complications for survivors. Neuroinvasive disease is most likely to occur for people under the age of 15 and over the age of 50. Symptoms usually appear 3–10 days after being bitten by an infected mosquito, but may appear up to three weeks later.

The early phase of EEE has a median duration of about 5 days but ranges from 0 to 28 days in duration. Acute symptoms include fever headache, nausea, vomiting, chills, fatigue, lethargy, malaise, muscle pain, joint pain, and swelling of lymph nodes. Usually within a few days, central nervous system involvement becomes apparent due to the emergence of neurological symptoms such as alterations in mental state, heightened irritability and agitation, personality changes, confusion, encephalitis, convulsions, seizures, paralysis, and loss of consciousness and coma. Localized neurological symptoms may occur as well, such as paralysis of cranial nerves, facial drooping, myoclonic jerks, and weakness in specific parts of the body, or on one side of the body. A stiff neck is indicative of infection in the meninges and meningitis.

Most seizures that occur are generalized, and most of these are tonic-clonic, followed by twitching. Focal seizures are less common, and complex seizures are the least common. In severe cases, status epilepticus may occur, in which there are prolonged seizures or multiple seizures consecutively without regaining consciousness between them. Elevated heart rate (tachycardia), elevated respiration rate (tachypnea), language difficulties (aphasia), and a strong desire to sleep (drowsiness or somnolence) may occur. Stupor or coma occur in most cases. Fluid may accumulate in the brain (cerebral edema), particularly in young children. Other possible symptoms include shock, which may be refractory, flaccid paralysis, difficulty speaking due to muscle weakness (dysarthria), discomfort to bright lights (photophobia), and diarrhea.

== Virology ==
Eastern equine encephalitis virus
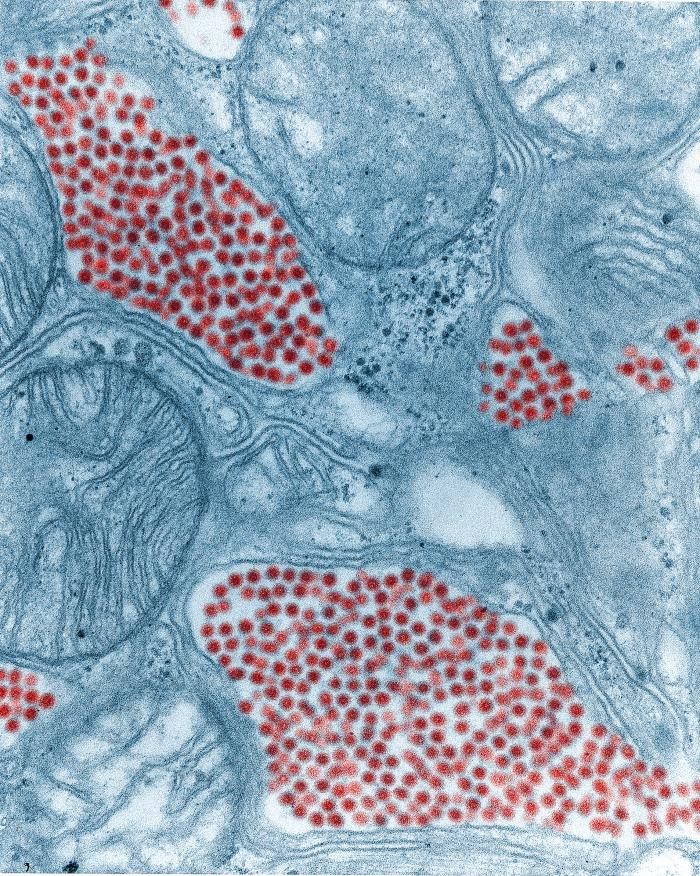
- Colourised TEM micrograph of a mosquito salivary gland: The virus particles (virions) are coloured red. (83,900x magnification)

Virus classification
- (unranked): Virus
- Realm: Riboviria
- Kingdom: Orthornavirae
- Phylum: Kitrinoviricota
- Class: Alsuviricetes
- Order: Martellivirales
- Family: Togaviridae
- Genus: Alphavirus
- Species: Alphavirus eastern

Synonyms
- Eastern equine encephalitis virus

EEE is caused primarily by Eastern equine encephalitis virus (EEEV) and secondarily by Madariaga virus (MADV). EEEV and MADV belong to the genus Alphavirus in the family Togaviridae. Alphaviruses are often sorted into Old World alphaviruses and New World alphaviruses, the latter of which includes EEEV and MADV. They are also sorted into arthritogenic (affecting the joints) or encephalitic (affecting the brain). Unlike arthritogenic alphaviruses, encephalitic alphaviruses are associated with mortality, especially EEEV, which is the most severe alphavirus to affect humans.

=== Genome and structure ===
The genome of EEEV comprises a positive-sense, single-stranded RNA strand about 12 kilobases in length. The genome starts with a non-coding region, followed by a single open reading frame (ORF) that encompasses two-thirds of the genome and encodes non-structural proteins. A second ORF encodes all structural proteins, separated from the non-structural ORF by a non-coding region. The structural ORF is followed by a non-coding region, and the genome then ends with a polyadenylated tail. The non-structural proteins are nsP1, nsP2, nsP3, and nsP4. The structural proteins are the capsid protein (CP), E3, E2, 6K/TF, and E1.

The functions of each protein are described hereafter.

- nsP1 is methyltransferase and guanyltransferase.
- nsP2 is a helicase and protease, and it interferes with the host immune response.
- nsP3 is a phosphoprotein, hydrolase, and interacts with host factors, including interfering with the host immune response.
- nsP4 is an RNA-dependent RNA polymerase and terminal adenylyltransferase.
- CP is the capsid protein and forms a protective shell around the genome.
- E2 and E1 are glycoproteins that form spikes on the surface of the viral envelope.
  - E2 binds to cellular receptors.
  - E1 mediates fusion of the viral envelope with the membrane of host endosomes.
- E3 is involved in translocating viral polyproteins, stabilizing E2-E1 spikes, and inhibiting premature membrane fusion.
- 6K has viroporin activity during budding and TF is a virulence factor.

The body (virion) of EEEV is about 70 nanometers in diameter and icosahedral in shape. It consists of the genome of the virus surrounded by a shell made of capsid proteins, called the capsid. The capsid is surrounded by a lipid membrane called an envelope, which contains spikes embedded in it that emanate from the surface of the envelope.

=== Life cycle ===
The replication cycle of EEEV begins when the E2 spike protein binds to receptors on the surface of a cell. The virion is then taken into the cell via endocytosis and stored in an endosome. A decrease in pH causes the viral envelope to fuse with the endosome, which empties the capsid into the host cell's cytosol. The capsid then disintegrates and releases viral RNA into the cytosol. The positive-sense genome is then used as messenger RNA (mRNA) by host cell ribosomes to translate the non-structural ORF to create a polyprotein that contains the non-structural proteins, P1234. A stop codon exists between the genes for nsP3 and nsP4, so many polyproteins are P123 without nsP4. For P1234 polyproteins, nsP2 uses its protease activity to self-cleave the polyprotein into P123 and nsP4. nsP4 then transcribes the positive-sense RNA genome to produce a negative-sense strand. Negative-sense RNA forms a duplex with positive-sense RNA and serves as a template for the synthesis of full-length positive-sense RNA for progeny viruses.

Synthesis of negative-sense RNA is followed by cis-cleavage of nsP1 and P23, the latter of which is cleaved in trans into nsP2 and nsP3. This causes a shift from producing primarily negative-sense RNA to primarily positive-sense RNA since nsP1, nsP2, and nsP3 are involved in the synthesis of positive-sense strands. Structural polyproteins are translated from sub-genomic mRNA. Usually, a CP/E3/E2/6K/E1 polyprotein is produced, but sometimes a ribosomal frameshift occurs that produces CP/E3/E2/TF without E1. These polyproteins are then cleaved by both viral and host proteases to produce the individual structural proteins. The spike proteins are translated in the endoplasmic reticulum (ER) and Golgi apparatus, inserted into the ER, and then translocated to the plasma membrane. Once sufficient capsid proteins exist, they assemble into capsids with viral RNA to form nucleocapsids in the cytosol. Capsids then bud from the membrane to obtain an envelope and leave the cell.

=== Lineages ===
Historically, four lineages or groups of EEEV were recognized: I, II, III, and IV. Group I is found in North America, the Caribbean, and Central America and is responsible for most human cases. The other types are found in Central America and South America, where they mainly cause disease in horses. Lineage I is Eastern equine encephalitis virus, while lineages II–IV are classified as a different species, Madariaga virus. Lineage II is distributed along the coasts of Central and South America, lineage III is found in the Amazon Basin, and lineage IV is in Brazil. North American strains are highly conserved genetically, as a single lineage has persisted as the dominant lineage since its isolation in 1933.

== Mechanism ==
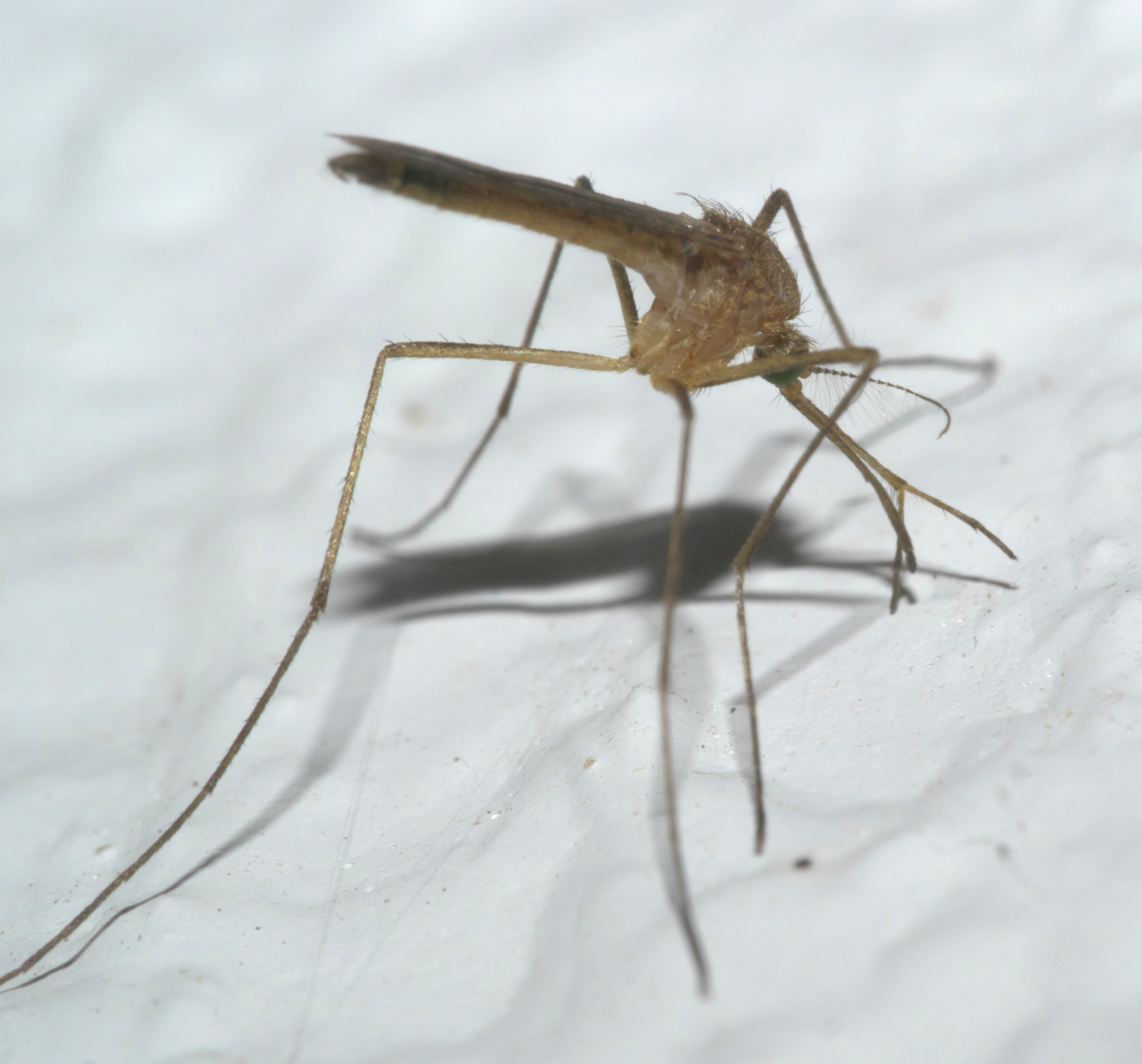
Culiseta melanura, the main enzootic vector of EEEV.

=== Transmission ===
Transmission of EEEV is maintained in the wild in an enzootic cycle between passerine birds and mosquitos that feed on passerines. These birds are the natural reservoirs of the virus and serve as amplification hosts since the virus multiplies easily in their bodies, especially in juveniles. Infection in passerines is asymptomatic, but because of high levels of viruses in the blood (viremia), they can transmit the virus to mosquitos that feed on them. The mosquito species Culiseta melanura is the main enzootic vector of EEEV. The virus is present in the saliva of infected mosquitos. When they feed on blood, their proboscis penetrates the skin, which causes saliva and EEEV to enter the body of their host. Cs. melanura mainly inhabits low-lying freshwater hardwood swamps, sphagnum bogs, and marshlands, environments favorable for growth of mosquito larvae. Most transmission of EEEV occurs in these environments. Transmission peaks during late summer to early fall, which corresponds to mosquito breeding patterns.

Many bird species are natural reservoirs of the virus. The wood thrush (Hlocichia mustelina) and the American robin (Turdus migratorius) contribute disproportionately to virus transmission as these are the main bloodmeal sources for Cs. melanura. Nearly all passerines are capable of spreading the virus, except the common starling, which experiences severe infection with high mortality. Non-passerines can become infected but do not amplify the virus to the same degree as passerines, which are the preferred hosts of Cs. melanura in the northeastern United States. An exception is the green heron, which is a major host for Cs. melanura in Vermont during June and July. While it is not known whether green herons are infected or develop viremia, there is some evidence that certain migratory ardeids are susceptible to EEEV in the southern United States. Other species that are reservoirs of EEEV are:

- Baltimore oriole
- black-capped chickadee
- blue jay
- chipping sparrow
- common grackle
- common yellowthroat
- field sparrow
- gray catbird
- northern cardinal
- ovenbird
- red-eyed vireo
- rose-breasted grosbeak
- savannah sparrow
- scarlet tanager
- song sparrow
- songbirds
- swamp sparrow
- tufted titmouse
- veery

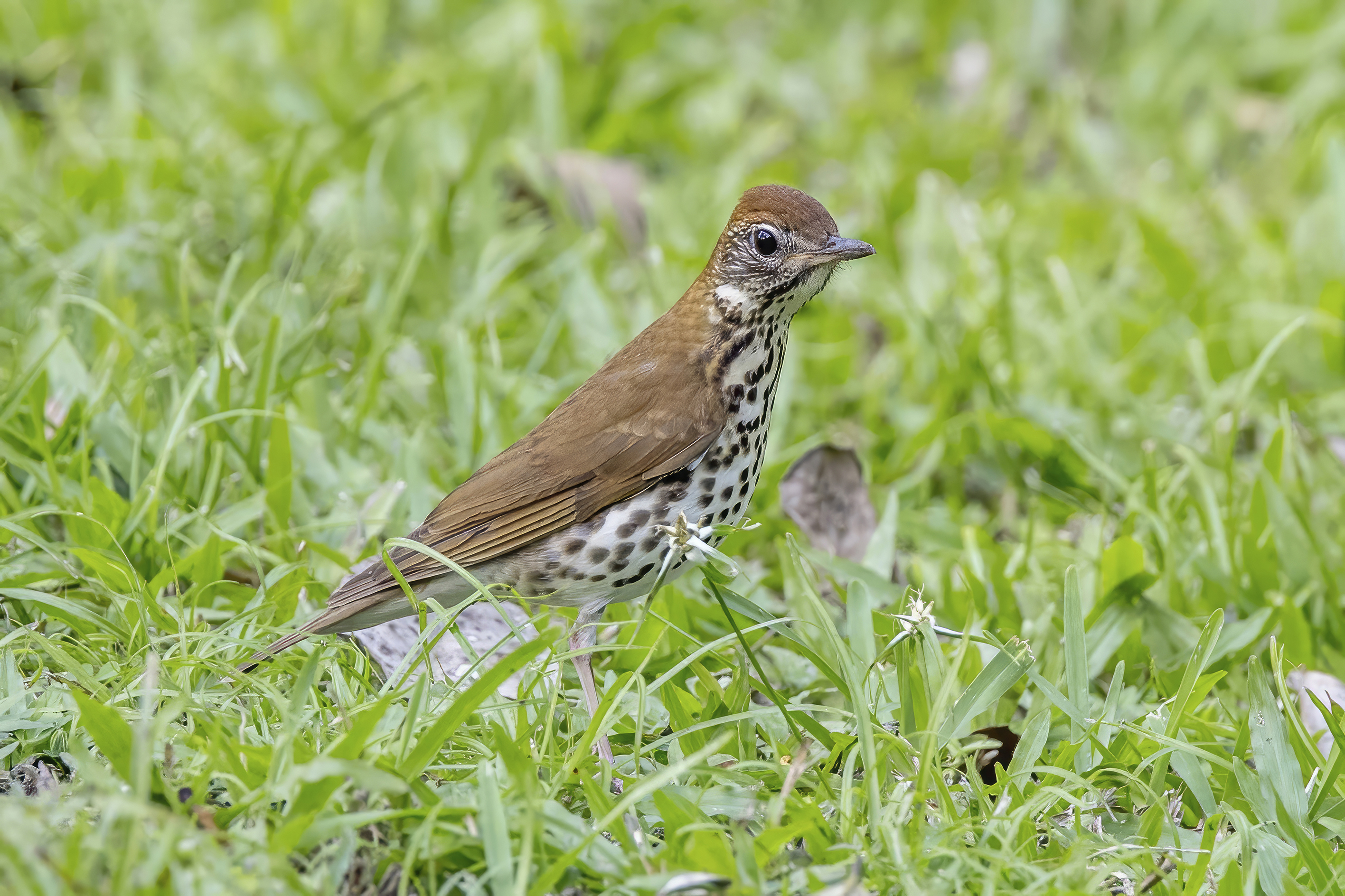
The wood thrush, a natural reservoir of EEEV.

While Cs. melanura usually feeds on passerine birds, it sometimes feeds on and spreads EEEV to other animals such as humans, equids, livestock, and other types of birds, including pheasants, galliforms, owls, and ratites. Cs. morsitans is a secondary enzootic vector of EEEV but is likely not involved in transmission of EEEV to mammals. These other hosts are considered dead-end hosts because infection does not result in sufficient viremia to infect feeding mosquitos, so they are not involved in the circulation of the virus. These spillover events occur irregularly and are usually due to bridge vectors that feed on both avian and mammalian hosts. Coquilletidia perturbans is suspected to be a major bridge vector. Other prominent bridge vectors include various Aedes, Anopheles, and Culex species, as well as Psorophora ferox and Uranotaenia sapphirina.

Epizootic transmission to humans and horses occurs in close proximity to habitats where EEEV circulates. Even though horses are considered dead-end hosts, some develop sufficient viremia to transmit EEEV back to mosquitos. In pheasants, feather picking and cannibalism contribute to the spread of the virus within flocks. Other possible means of transmission include organ transplantation and aerosols. At the cellular level, infection results in the formation of fibers extending from the surface of the cell membrane, which can aid in transmitting the virus without it being as exposed to the extracellular environment.

In North America, EEEV overwinters in temperate locations, but strains are periodically introduced from the southeast USA to temperate locations. In the northeast USA, EEEV strains persist for 1–5 years before becoming extinct in the region. New virus strains are then introduced to initiate new transmission cycles. This is likely due to migratory birds from Florida, where transmission occurs year-round. EEEV is thought to mainly circulate in southeastern states, which are reservoirs for distribution to other locations. In the southeast, where Cs. melanura isn't as common, Culex erraticus, Culex peccator, and Uranotaenia sapphirina may be enzootic vectors. These mosquitos feed on cold-blooded animals such as reptiles and amphibians, so these animals, including snakes, may play a role in enzootic transmission by hosting EEEV through winters.

Along with the aforementioned multi-year cycles, epidemics occur following periods of excess rainfall starting from the prior year. The high rainfall and accumulated water in swamps likely creates a more favorable environment for Cs. melanura. During years with a high number of human and equine cases, there is significantly increased carriage of EEEV by Cs. melanura. In South America, Madariaga virus is found mainly in Culex mosquitos, particularly those of the Melanoconion subgenus, which may serve as enzootic vectors. Rodents and marsupials may be the reservoirs of Madariaga virus.

=== Pathophysiology ===
Infection starts with replication in lymphoid tissues, then spreads through the bloodstream and olfactory nerves to the central nervous system, where EEEV causes encephalitis and other symptoms. The virus damages the blood-brain barrier, causes fluid buildup in the central nervous system and the death of neurons, and replicates in neurons and glial cells, which leads to inflammation. Injury of neurons occurs directly from viral toxicity and secondarily through inflammation in the CNS, which affects the basal ganglia, thalami, and cortex. Infected cells show decreased cellular mRNA accumulation, the addition of phosphoryl groups (phosphorylation) to eukaryotic initiation factor 2 alpha (eIF2α) proteins, and inhibition of host cell protein synthesis and expression of reporter genes due to the presence of the viral capsid.

EEEV can infect osteoblasts, dendritic cells, fibroblasts, skin proximal keratinocytes, ventricular interstitial cells, and ovarian stromal cells. EEEV binds efficiently to heparin sulfate receptors, which blocks it from infecting peripheral lymphoid tissues or myeloid cells. This, however, increases viral replication in the central nervous system, which contributes to the severity of symptoms during infection. In mosquitos, heparan sulfate binding promotes infection by increasing infectivity in the mosquito's gut epithelium after blood meals. Other receptors that EEEV binds to include the very-low-density lipoprotein receptor (VLDLR) and apolipoprotein E receptor 2 (ApoER2).

=== Immunology ===
The host immune response is driven by stimulation of macrophages, dendritic cells, T lymphocytes, B lymphocytes, microglia, and astrocytes. The first cells targeted during infection are dendritic cells and fibroblasts, which causes activation of pattern recognition receptors (PRRs) that recognize viral double-stranded RNA. This initiates a series of signals through mitochondrial antiviral-signaling proteins (MAVS) that leads to type 1 interferon (IFN) production. Type 1 IFNs activate the JAK-STAT pathway, which leads to the expression of interferon-stimulated genes (ISGs) that restrict viral replication and spread. If early infection is not resolved, then EEEV can invade the CNS. EEEV can infect macrophages, which triggers production of cytokines. Infection increases the amount of chemokines in circulation, which alters the blood brain barrier and allows immune cells to infiltrate the CNS. CD4+ and CD8+ cells move to the brain and release pro-inflammatory cytokines, which worsens damage.

EEEV can evade the immune response through various means. nsP2 suppresses the host interferon response, interferes with host nuclear import machinery, which degrades immune signaling molecules and represses transcription of ISGs, and it inhibits activation of transcription factors, such as STAT1, that are involved in the antiviral response. nsP2 causes downregulation of major histocompatibility complex (MHC) molecules, which hinders the ability of antigen-presenting cells to present viral antigens to T cells, which impairs activation of CD4+ and CD8+ T cells. Inhibition of nsP3 can interfere with the formation of stress granules, which prevents the host cell from effectively blocking viral replication. EEEV's interference with PRR and IFN signaling also creates an imbalance in the immune response—there is excessive production of pro-inflammatory cytokines, which contributes to disease severity.

== Prevention ==
Mosquito control methods such as insecticides, larvicides, elimination of mosquito breeding sites, and the use of insect repellents can reduce the spread of EEE and the likelihood of infection. Educating the public about how to avoid mosquito bites can also significantly reduce the risk of infection.

=== Vaccination ===
A vaccine is available for horses. This vaccine is an inactivated vaccine that uses the TC-83 strain of EEEV. It is usually given in combination with vaccines for Western equine encephalitis (WEE), Venezuelan equine encephalitis (VEE), and tetanus, and is also used by laboratory workers to protect from accidental exposure. The vaccine does not induce antibodies to South American forms of EEE. No vaccine specifically made for humans exists. Human vaccines that have been investigated for EEE include viral vector-based vaccines, plasmid DNA vaccines, and trivalent vaccines that protect against EEE, WEE, and VEE.

== Diagnosis ==
Early diagnosis of EEE is difficult since symptoms overlap with other viral encephalitides. Detection of EEEV RNA in early infection can diagnose EEE, especially in the absence of IgM antibodies since the presence of EEEV RNA indicates recent infection. The primary means of diagnosis, however, is by testing for anti-EEEV-specific IgM in serum or cerebrospinal fluid (CSF) via enzyme-linked immunosorbent assay (ELISA). Some other methods, usually used during autopsy, include isolation of EEEV in viral cultures, nucleic acid amplification assays, and immunohistochemical assays of infected CSF or brain tissue. Plaque reduction neutralization tests (PRNT) to detect EEEV-specific neutralizing antibodies can be performed for people who have elevated IgM titers to rule out false-positives. If samples are tested too soon, there may be false-negative results. Immunofluorescent assays may fail to diagnose EEE, in which case microparticle immunoassays can screen for EEEV IgM.

Neuroimaging is helpful for identifying the severity of disease. Fluid-attenuated inversion recovery (FLAIR) scans, a type of magnetic resonance imaging (MRI), show significant involvement of the cortex, basal ganglia, thalami, and brainstem. Viral infiltration of deep gray matter structures such as the basal ganglia and thalami is visible. This occurs with other arthropod-borne viral infections as well as prion diseases, rabies, and autoimmune encephalitides. EEE can be distinguished from these diseases based on geography, how quickly symptoms develop, exposure to vectors, and family history. In rare cases, the middle cerebellar peduncle may be affected. A distinctive feature of EEE often visible in T2-weighted images is areas of increased signal in the basal ganglia and thalami. Electrical activity in the brain can be analyzed with electroencephalogram (EEG) tests. EEG findings range from mild diffuse encephalopathy to non-convulsive status epilepticus, which is reflective of the degree of brain dysfunction. In more severe cases, EEG shows extremely depressed brain activity.

A lumbar puncture may be done to analyze CSF. EEEV infection has elevated opening pressure upon performing a lumbar puncture. Apart from antibody testing, analysis of CSF shows an increased prevalence of certain cells, particularly white blood cells (pleocytosis), in CSF. Initially, there is neutrophil-predominant pleocytosis, which shifts to lymphocyte-predominance. CSF contains elevated protein levels and normal glucose levels. Analysis of blood shows that in severe cases, there is too little sodium in the blood. Examination of central nervous system tissue shows infiltration of neutrophils and mononuclear cells, accumulation of inflammatory cells in perivascular space (perivascular cuffing), the presence of inclusion bodies, and necrosis of neurons. Autopsy results show severe loss of neurons and gliosis of the dorsal motor nucleus.

== Management ==
There are no antiviral drugs currently in use to treat EEE. Treatment of severe illness is supportive and includes corticosteroids, anti-convulsants to manage seizures, intravenous fluids, tracheal intubation to aid with respiration, and fever-reducing drugs (anti-pyretics). Intravenous immunoglobulin (IVIg) has been tested as a potential treatment by silencing auto-reactive T cells and neutralizing pathogenic antibodies. IVIg treatment is safe, but results are mixed on whether it is an effective treatment. Physical therapy, occupational therapy, and speech therapy are often needed after EEE to deal with issues related to motor skills, daily life, and communication.

== Prognosis ==
The case fatality rate of EEE in humans varies from 30% to 75% depending on age. Prognosis is worse in newborns under 1 year of age and in adults over 55, with death most likely in the elderly and least likely in middle-aged adults. Death is rapid and occurs 3–5 days after the start of infection. Very low levels of sodium in the blood and elevated white blood cell count in cerebrospinal fluid are associated with worse outcomes. A reduction in alertness and conscious upon hospital admission and seizures within 24 hours of symptoms appearing are associated with greater probability of death. Survival is more likely if bi-hemispheric or brainstem injury do not occur. The median duration of coma for those who recover from it is about 5 days.

50–90% of survivors experience long-term neurological damage or disability that ranges from minor to severe. Infants are the most likely to develop long-term neurological complications. Long-term complications include impaired language ability (aphasia), convulsions, seizures, paralysis, intellectual disability, personality and behavioral changes, emotional instability, memory loss, headaches, drowsiness, confusion, muscle twitching, photophobia, and sleep disorder. Coordination problems, abnormal muscle tightness (spasticity), and muscle weakness that can cause issues with balance and fine motor skills may also occur.

Some survivors develop seizure disorders, which require continual treatment with anti-seizure medication. Post-traumatic stress disorder, depression, and anxiety are more common in EEE survivors than people who haven't had EEE. Chronic exhaustion is common after EEE, as are problems with the nervous system and joints that can cause persistent pain or discomfort. Long-term neurological complications are caused by damage to the brain during infection. For example, seizures following EEE are associated with damage to the temporal lobe. Other complications may be attributable to the death of neurons, inflammation of blood vessels (vasculitis), blood clots (thrombosis), and gliosis in motor neurons.

== Epidemiology ==
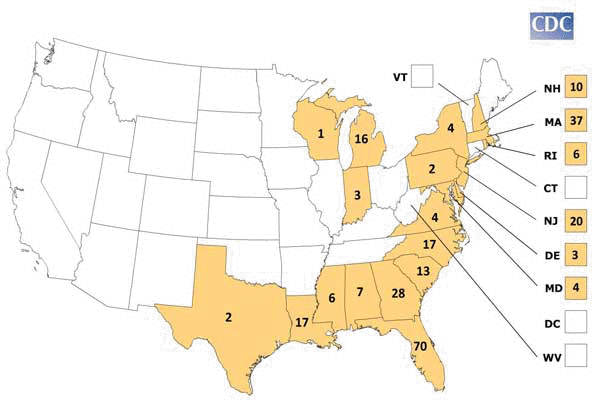
A disease-incidence map for human cases of EEE, 1964–2010.

EEE mainly occurs in the United States in states along the Atlantic Ocean, Gulf of Mexico, and in some areas near the Great Lakes. Not many people live in habitats where EEE vectors reside, so EEE cases are rare. Fewer than ten human cases are reported in a typical year in the US. This is estimated to be only about 4–5% of infections, though, since most infections are asymptomatic. Most cases occur in summer to early fall, when mosquito vectors are most active and transmission occurs in both subtropical and temperate regions. In Florida, however, cases in both humans and equids occur year-round. In more temperate regions, cases rarely occur prior to July and after October.

Although few cases occur in a typical year, periodic outbreaks do occur. For example, a large outbreak occurred in the summer of 2019. The year saw 38 confirmed cases, with 14 deaths, mostly in northeastern US states and Michigan. Outbreaks are associated with heavy rainfall during the preceding year and later summer precipitation during epidemic years, possibly due to bolstering the habitat of Cs. melanura larvae and bridge vectors. Horses are usually the first to develop EEE in outbreaks, so an increase in cases in horses may be predictive of an upcoming outbreak in humans.

EEE incidence became more common throughout the 2000s. The spread of EEE may be due to regeneration of local habitats, which are recovering from prolonged periods of environmental destruction for the agriculture and logging industries. With environmental rejuvenation, there is a more productive environment for Cs. melanura reproduction. This also benefits the population of birds that are amplification hosts of EEEV, such as the American robin. Furthermore, suburban and exurban development into these areas increases the likelihood of exposure. Climate change may also contribute to the spread of EEEV by permitting its vectors to survive later in the year and by expanding the geographic range of the virus to areas where its vectors did not previously inhabit.

In South America, Madariaga virus is found throughout humid tropical forest areas, the Pantanal wetland region of Brazil, in the Amazon Basin in Brazil, and in northern Argentina. In temperate regions of South America, such as Argentina, infections tend to occur in the summer; elsewhere, EEE is a year-round disease. Unlike in North America, human cases in Central America and South America are very rare and the disease is principally an equine disease. Even during major horse epizootics, it is rare for human cases to occur.

In general, EEEV is distributed along the eastern side of the Americas. In North America, EEEV has been identified in Canada in Quebec and Nova Scotia, the United States, and Mexico. Periodic outbreaks occur in the Caribbean, including Cuba and Hispaniola, though human infections in Cuba are rare. Cases have also been identified in Jamaica, but permanent enzootic circulation has not been verified there or in the Dominican Republic. In Central America, EEE cases have occurred in Panama. In South America, EEEV has been detected in Colombia, Ecuador, Venezuela, Guyana, Suriname, Brazil, and Argentina.

== In animals ==
In horses, symptoms appear 1–3 weeks after being bitten by an infected mosquito. Symptoms begin with a fever that usually lasts 1 to 2 days. Horses develop anorexia, hyper-excitability, blindness, decreased muscle coordination, severe mental depression, convulsions, and they lie down horizontally (recumbency). They then develop paralysis that makes it difficult for them to raise their head. Complete paralysis and subsequently death usually occur 2–4 days after symptoms appear. The case fatality rate in horses is 70–90%, and those that survive have permanent brain damage. Juveniles are more vulnerable to severe disease. Outbreaks of EEE are most common in horses.

Infection in birds is usually asymptomatic, but high mortality has been observed in chukar partridges, pheasants, egrets, glossy ibises, rock doves, house sparrows, psittacine birds, ratites, African penguins, chickens less than 14 days old, pigeons, Pekin ducks, and whooping cranes. Turkeys have high mortality and diseased egg production 2–3 days after infection, which lasts up to 15 days after the start of infection. Many domesticated birds develop encephalitis and disease in internal organs. Outbreaks sometimes occur in certain poultry such as pheasants, turkeys, ratites, and quails. Apart from birds, EEE has been observed in sheep, cattle, deer, llamas, alpacas, pigs, dogs, goats, bats, and small mammals such as rodents. Experimental studies in non-human primates show similar severe symptoms as those experienced by humans.

== History ==
EEEV was first recorded during an outbreak in horses in Massachusetts, USA in 1831. During the outbreak, 75 horses died to neurological disease from midsummer to early autumn in eastern Massachusetts. Another equine epizootic occurred in Long Island, New York in 1845. EEEV was first isolated from horse brains and linked to EEE during an epizootic in the coastal parts of Delaware, Maryland, New Jersey, and Virginia in 1933. It was shown to be distinct from virus strains isolated from horses in California, now known as Western equine encephalitis virus. Madariaga virus was first identified in 1936 from a horse in Argentina. The first human cases were identified in 1938 in Massachusetts, during an outbreak with 38 human cases and 248 horse cases. 25 of the 38 human cases resulted in death. That same year, an epizootic occurred in Connecticut and Rhode Island and involved dozens of horses and multiple pheasant flocks.

Southern New Jersey was historically an area greatly affected by EEE, with continual epizootics in the 1930s and epidemics in the following decades. The most severe was in 1959, in which 33 human cases of EEE occurred. Serological surveys of the population showed that only about 1 in 23 (4.3%) human infections resulted in encephalitis. EEEV was first isolated from a mosquito in 1949 in Cq. perturbans and in 1951 in Cs. melanura. Subsequent field studies showed that Cs. melanura was the primary enzootic reservoir of EEEV. Soon after EEV was discovered, birds were suspected as the primary amplification hosts of the virus. The virus was first isolated from domestic pheasants and pigeons in 1938 and then wild passerine birds in 1950.

The first human case in New York was identified in 1971 and then discovered in upstate New York near Oneida Lake, far away from the coastal areas typically affected by EEE. The first human case in Michigan was in 1980. Sporadic disease outbreaks have occurred in eastern Connecticut and Rhode Island since 1938 and possibly before then. More recently, human cases have been expanding northward into New Hampshire for the first time in 2005, Vermont in 2012, and Maine in 2014. The first European case of EEE occurred in 2007 after a Scottish man became infected in New Hampshire. In 2010, lineages II, III, and IV were reclassified as a distinct species from EEEV, Madariaga virus. Canada reported its first human case of EEE in 2016 in southwestern Ontario.
