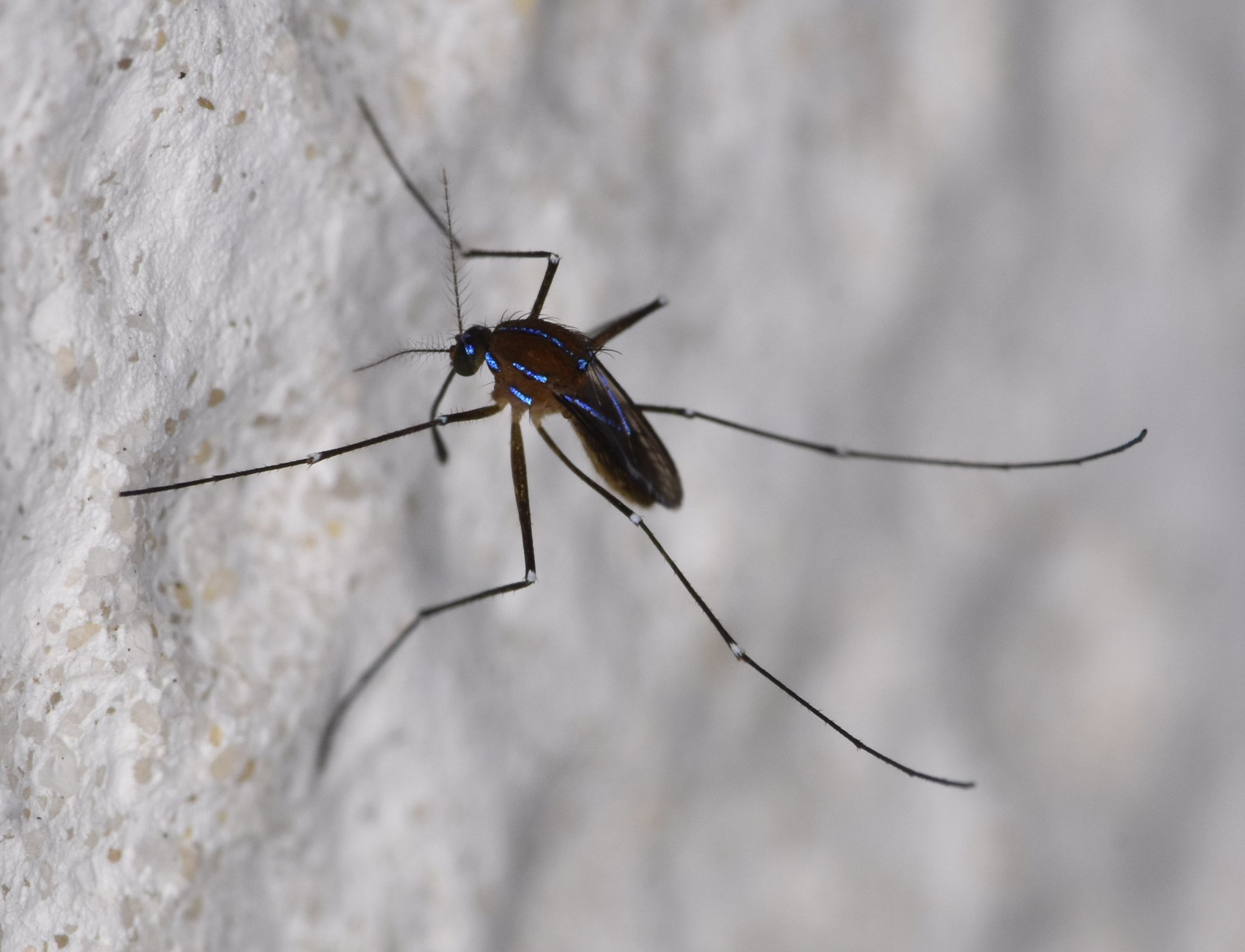

Scientific classification
- Kingdom: Animalia
- Phylum: Arthropoda
- Clade: Pancrustacea
- Class: Insecta
- Order: Diptera
- Family: Culicidae
- Genus: Uranotaenia
- Subgenus: Uranotaenia
- Species: U. sapphirina

Binomial name
- Uranotaenia sapphirina (Osten Sacken, 1868)

Synonyms
- Aedes sapphirina Osten Sacken, 1868; Uranotaenia coquilletti Dyar and Knab, 1906

= Uranotaenia sapphirina =

Species of fly

Uranotaenia sapphirina is a species of mosquito in the family Culicidae. It is a common species found throughout eastern North America. Uranotaenia sapphirina was found from an experiment to be unlike Uranotaenia lowii which feeds only on anurans (frogs and toads), instead feeding exclusively on annelid hosts such as earthworms and leeches.
