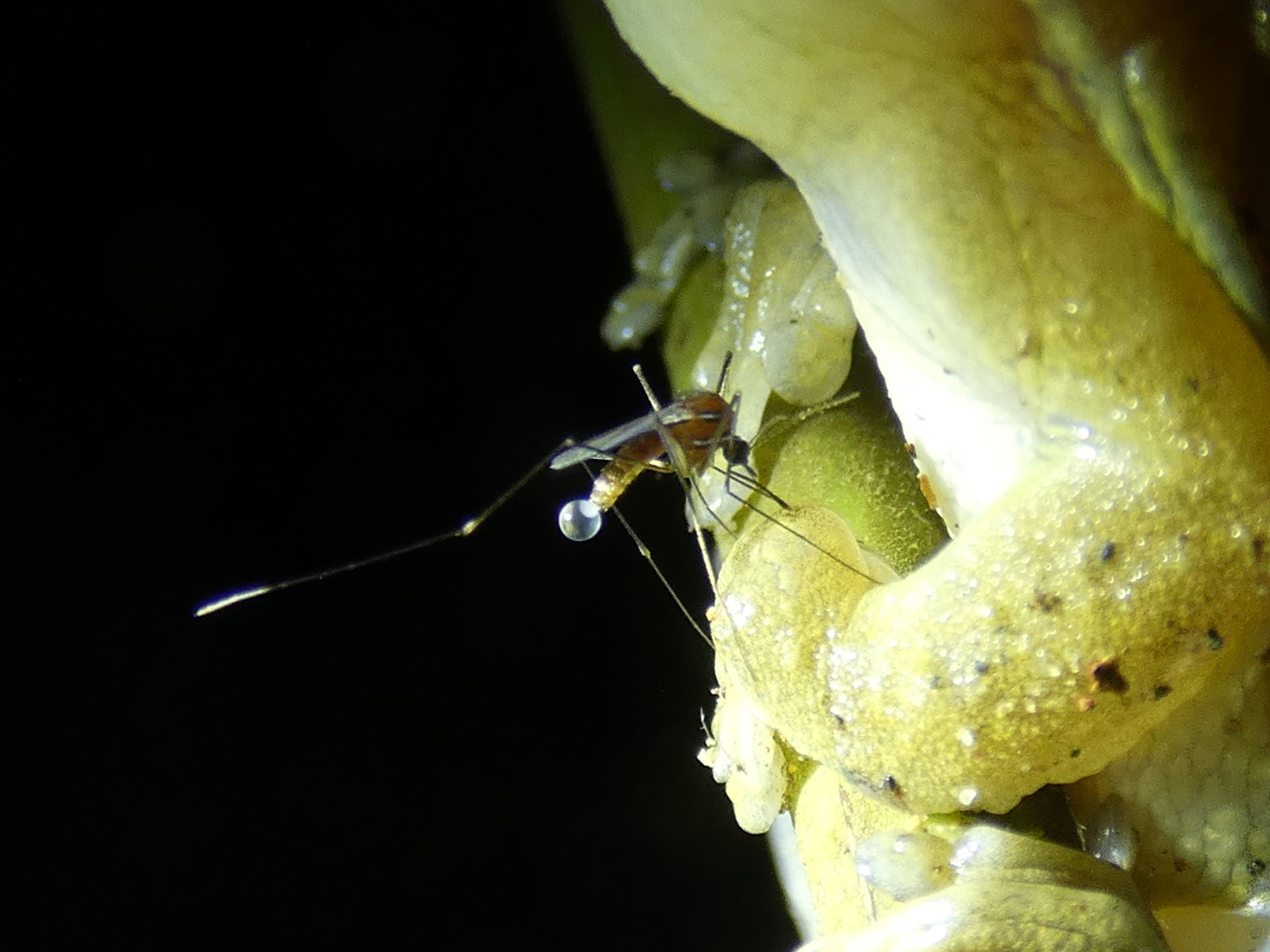
- Uranotaenia ditaenionota

Scientific classification
- Kingdom: Animalia
- Phylum: Arthropoda
- Class: Insecta
- Order: Diptera
- Family: Culicidae
- Tribe: Uranotaeniini
- Genus: Uranotaenia; Lynch Arribálzaga, 1891

= Uranotaenia (subgenus) =

Subgenus of flies

Uranotaenia is a subgenus of the mosquito genus Uranotaenia with 121 species:

== Species ==
Species include:

- Uranotaenia aequatorianna Leví-Castillo, 1953
- Uranotaenia alba Theobald, 1901
- Uranotaenia albescens Taylor, 1914
- Uranotaenia alboabdominalis Theobald, 1910
- Uranotaenia alboannulata (Theobald, 1905)
- Uranotaenia albocephala da Cunha Ramos & Brunhes, 2004
- Uranotaenia albosternopleura Peters, 1963
- Uranotaenia amiensis Peters, 1963
- Uranotaenia andavakae Doucet, 1950
- Uranotaenia angolensis da Cunha Ramos, 1985
- Uranotaenia annandalei Barraud, 1926
- Uranotaenia anopheloides Brunhes & Razafindrasolo, 1975
- Uranotaenia antennalis Taylor, 1919
- Uranotaenia apicalis Theobald, 1903
- Uranotaenia argentipleura da Cunha Ramos & Brunhes, 2004
- Uranotaenia arguellesi Baisas, 1935
- Uranotaenia argyrotarsis Leicester, 1908
- Uranotaenia balfouri Theobald, 1904
- Uranotaenia barnesi Belkin, 1953
- Uranotaenia benoiti Wolfs, 1964 (in Benoit, 1964)
- Uranotaenia bertii Cova García & Rausseo, 1964
- Uranotaenia bidentata da Cunha Ramos & Brunhes, 2004
- Uranotaenia bilineata Theobald, 1909
- Uranotaenia bimaculiala Leicester, 1908
- Uranotaenia bricenoi Cova García, Pulido, Escalante de Ugueto, Amarista & Mora, 1987
- Uranotaenia briseis Dyar, 1925
- Uranotaenia caeruleocephala Theobald, 1901
- Uranotaenia caliginosa Philip, 1931
- Uranotaenia calosomata Dyar & Knab, 1907
- Uranotaenia campestris Leicester, 1908
- Uranotaenia chorleyi Edwards, 1936
- Uranotaenia christophersi Barraud, 1926
- Uranotaenia civinskii Belkin, 1953
- Uranotaenia clara Dyar & Shannon, 1925
- Uranotaenia coatzacoalcos Dyar & Knab, 1906
- Uranotaenia connali Edwards, 1912
- Uranotaenia cooki Root, 1937
- Uranotaenia davisi Lane, 1943
- Uranotaenia diraphati Peyton & Klein, 1970
- Uranotaenia ditaenionota Prado, 1931
- Uranotaenia dumonti Doucet, 1949
- Uranotaenia edwardsi Barraud, 1926
- Uranotaenia falcipes Banks, 1906
- Uranotaenia fimbriata King & Hoogstraal, 1947
- Uranotaenia fraseri Edwards, 1912
- Uranotaenia gabaldoni Cova García, Pulido F., Escalante de Ugueto & Mora R., 1987
- Uranotaenia geniculata da Cunha Ramos & Brunhes, 2004
- Uranotaenia geometrica Theobald, 1901
- Uranotaenia gerdae Slooff, 1963
- Uranotaenia grassei da Cunha Ramos & Brunhes, 2004
- Uranotaenia hamoni Grjebine, 1953
- Uranotaenia hebes Barraud, 1931
- Uranotaenia hebrardi da Cunha Ramos & Brunhes, 2004
- Uranotaenia heiseri Baisas, 1935
- Uranotaenia hopkinsi Edwards, 1932
- Uranotaenia hystera Dyar & Knab, 1913
- Uranotaenia incognita Galindo, Blanton & Peyton, 1954
- Uranotaenia iriartei Cova García, Pulido F., Escalante de Ugueto & Mora R., 1987
- Uranotaenia joucouri da Cunha Ramos & Brunhes, 2004
- Uranotaenia lanei Martinez & Prosen, 1953
- Uranotaenia lateralis Ludlow, 1905
- Uranotaenia lebiedi da Cunha Ramos & Brunhes, 2004
- Uranotaenia leucoptera (Theobald, 1907)
- Uranotaenia longirostris Leicester, 1908
- Uranotaenia lowii Theobald, 1901
- Uranotaenia ludlowae Dyar & Shannon, 1925
- Uranotaenia macfarlanei Edwards, 1914
- Uranotaenia machadoi da Cunha Ramos, 1986
- Uranotaenia madagascarica da Cunha Ramos & Brunhes, 2004
- Uranotaenia mathesoni Lane, 1943
- Uranotaenia mayeri Edwards, 1912
- Uranotaenia mayottensis Brunhes, 1977
- Uranotaenia mendiolai Baisas, 1935
- Uranotaenia metatarsata Edwards, 1914
- Uranotaenia micans Leicester, 1908
- Uranotaenia moramangae da Cunha Ramos & Brunhes, 2004
- Uranotaenia moresbyensis Peters, 1963
- Uranotaenia nataliae Lynch Arribálzaga, 1891
- Uranotaenia neireti Edwards, 1920
- Uranotaenia neotibialis King & Hoogstraal, 1947
- Uranotaenia nivea Leicester, 1908
- Uranotaenia nivipes (Theobald, 1905)
- Uranotaenia novaguinensis Peters, 1963
- Uranotaenia orientalis Barraud, 1926
- Uranotaenia orthodoxa Dyar, 1921
- Uranotaenia oteizai Perez Vigueras, 1956
- Uranotaenia pallidocephala Theobald, 1908
- Uranotaenia pallidoventer Theobald, 1903
- Uranotaenia palmeirimi de Meillon & Rebêlo, 1941
  - Uranotaenia'' subspecies ''dundo da Cunha Ramos, 1993
  - Uranotaenia'' subspecies ''palmeirimi de Meillon & Rebêlo, 1941
- Uranotaenia paludosa Galindo, Blanton & Peyton, 1954
- Uranotaenia paralateralis Peters, 1964
- Uranotaenia paranovaguinensis Peters, 1963
- Uranotaenia philonuxia Philip, 1931
- Uranotaenia pifanoi Cova Garcia, Pulido F. & Escalante de Ugueto, 1981
- Uranotaenia prajimi Peyton & Rattanarithikul, 1970
- Uranotaenia pulcherrima Lynch Arribálzaga, 1891
- Uranotaenia pygmaea Theobald, 1901
- Uranotaenia rachoui Xavier, da Silva Mattos & da Silva, 1970
- Uranotaenia rampae Peyton & Klein, 1970
- Uranotaenia reyi Baisas, 1935
- Uranotaenia riverai Duret, 1970
- Uranotaenia roberti da Cunha Ramos & Brunhes, 2004
- Uranotaenia rutherfordi Edwards, 1922
- Uranotaenia sapphirina (Osten Sacken, 1868)
- Uranotaenia setosax King & Hoogstraal, 1947
- Uranotaenia sexaueri Belkin, 1953
- Uranotaenia socialis Theobald, 1901
- Uranotaenia solomonis Belkin, 1953
- Uranotaenia sombooni Peyton & Klein, 1970
- Uranotaenia subnormalis Martini, 1920
- Uranotaenia subtibioclada King & Hoogstraal, 1947
- Uranotaenia telmatophila Galindo, Blanton & Peyton, 1954
- Uranotaenia testacea Theobald, 1905
- Uranotaenia tibialis Taylor, 1919
- Uranotaenia tibioclada King & Hoogstraal, 1947
- Uranotaenia trapidoi Galindo, Blanton & Peyton, 1954
- Uranotaenia trilineata Leicester, 1908
- Uranotaenia typhlosomata Dyar & Knab, 1907
- Uranotaenia unimaculiala Leicester, 1908
- Uranotaenia wysockii Belkin, 1953
- Uranotaenia yunnanensis Dong, Dong & Wu, 2004
