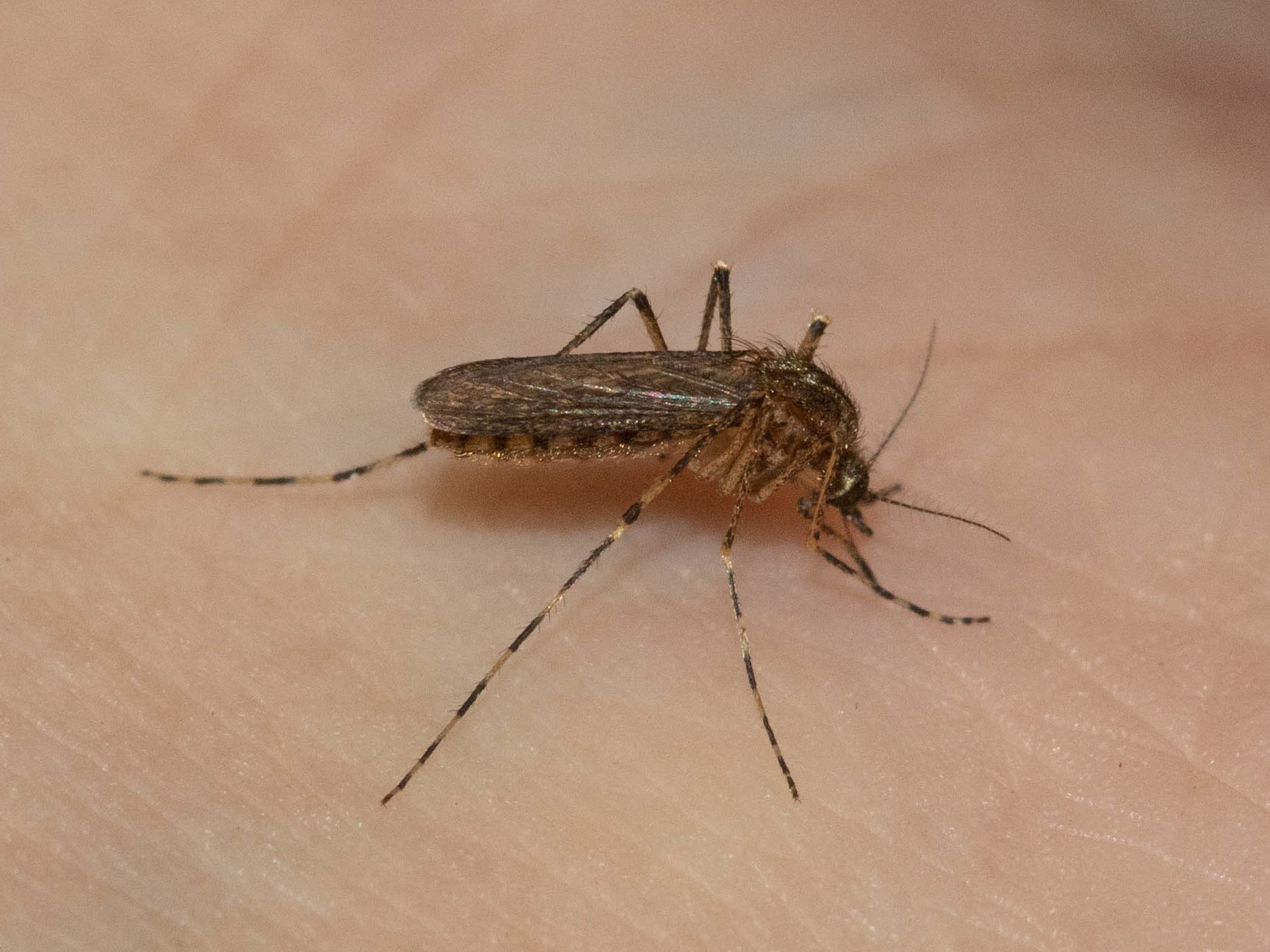

Scientific classification
- Kingdom: Animalia
- Phylum: Arthropoda
- Clade: Pancrustacea
- Class: Insecta
- Order: Diptera
- Family: Culicidae
- Genus: Coquillettidia
- Subgenus: Coquillettidia
- Species: C. perturbans

Binomial name
- Coquillettidia perturbans (Walker, 1856)

= Coquillettidia perturbans =

Species of fly

Coquillettidia perturbans is a species of mosquito that have been documented in every continent except Antarctica. This mosquito is a known vector of West Nile virus and Eastern equine encephalomyelitis. The geographic range of C. perturbans is increasing due to the growing extensity of the feeding area. They are known to exist throughout the United States, mainly with a southern distribution, and are mammalophilic.

== Importance ==
Coquillettidia sp. are vectors for many diseases, including West Nile virus, and Eastern equine encephalomyelitis, among others. C. perturbans infected with Eastern equine encephalomyelitis (or EEE) have been discovered in the United States, eastern Canada, the Caribbean, and Central America. This mosquito is implicated in transmitting EEE to humans, horses, resident birds, and sometimes emus, and also transmitting Jamestown Canyon virus while feeding on deer. Though C. perturbans are not usually the primary vector of EEE, it still influences the spread of this disease due to its ability to fly long distances and feed on large animals, including humans. The climate where this disease transmission takes place most often can be defined as swamp and/or hardwood forest habitat.

== Anatomy ==
Coquillettidia perturbans is a mosquito that can range from 2.0 mm to (10.0–15.0 mm) in length. The body of this species contains three segments consisting of a head, thorax, and abdomen. The prominent identifying characteristics of C. perturbans consist of: dark and light scales of the legs in an alternating pattern, the sides of the thorax covered with groups of or scale bristles, while the scales of the wings and palps can be defined as tear-drop in shape and located around the veins and outer edges of the wings, alternating in color. General characteristics of C. perturbans include, but are not limited to: a small head, wedge-shaped thorax, elongated and slim wings, a lengthened and almost cylindrical abdomen, plumose antennae in males and pilose antennae in females, along with a long and slender proboscis, enabling this species with a piercing and sucking apparatus in order to obtain blood meals. The larva and pupa of C. perturbans are small and contain a siphon modified for respiration through underwater, aquatic plant life.

== Habitat ==
Coquillettidia perturbans are most commonly found in areas of low elevation and high vegetation that have warm summers and a high degree of humidity in the air. This allows for the swamp-like habitat to exist for the growth of cattails (Typha latifolia) and also Juncus sp. C. perturbans prefer in order for prime larval and pupal development to occur. The water quality of the area also plays an important factor for the Coquillettidia sp.: the water must not have current, it also must have a neutral pH, low salt concentration, and a low level of suspended particle matter. The distribution of this species is growing due to the growing area of feeding range, and disease transmission experienced.

== Life cycle ==
Coquillettidia perturbans lay their eggs in the form of an egg raft in a marsh or swamp habitat. This raft usually contains around 100 eggs, which generally hatch after several days depending on the temperature of the environment. The larvae and pupae are adapted with an abdominal segment capable of piercing the inner gaseous tissue of the aquatic plant life, or aerenchyma, located within this environment, such as cattails (Typha latifolia) and Juncus sp. This piercing allows access to the root epidermal cell layer of the plant, or the aerenchyma, in order to breathe, allowing the larvae and pupae to complete atmospheric oxygen uptake exclusive of the risk of being located near the surface of the water, as to avoid predators and insecticides. C. perturbans complete four aquatic larval instars while pupal development ranges from a few hours to a few weeks depending on the climate present. If the climate consists of cold weather, this could lengthen the larval period several months. The pupal stage can range from a few hours to several weeks, depending on the climate of the environment. Approximately twenty-four hours after the adult is released from the pupal case, the wings have completed the hardening process and are fully expanded, enabling it to fly. The life cycle takes around seven to sixteen days to complete, and the C. perturbans can live up to five or six months if the hibernation stage takes place.

== See also ==
- Mosquito control
