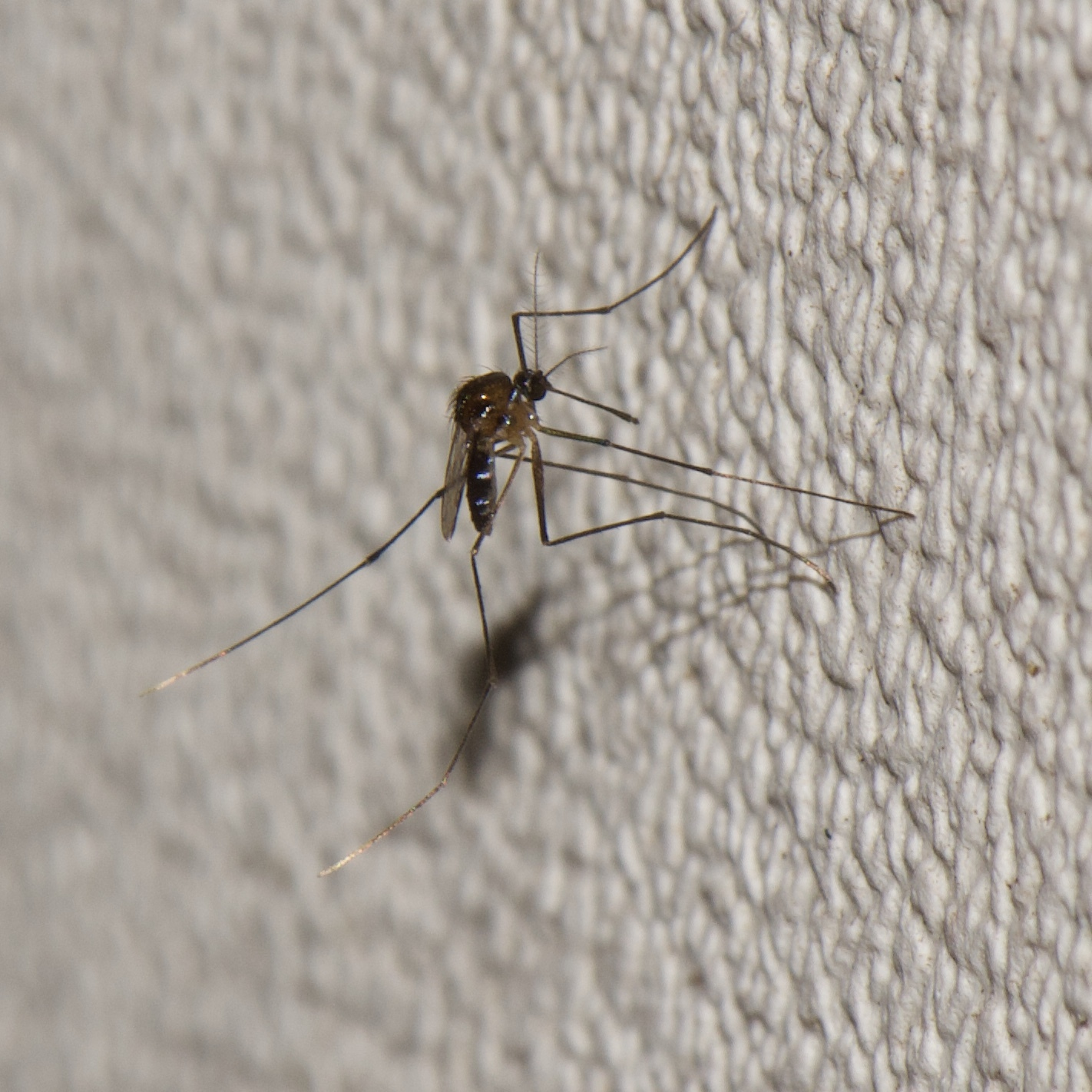

Scientific classification
- Domain: Eukaryota
- Kingdom: Animalia
- Phylum: Arthropoda
- Class: Insecta
- Order: Diptera
- Family: Culicidae
- Genus: Uranotaenia
- Subgenus: Uranotaenia
- Species: U. lowii

Binomial name
- Uranotaenia lowii Theobald, 1901

Synonyms
- Uranotaenia continentalis Dyar and Knab, 1906

= Uranotaenia lowii =

Species of fly

Uranotaenia lowii is a species of mosquito in the family Culicidae. It is found in North, Central, and South America.
