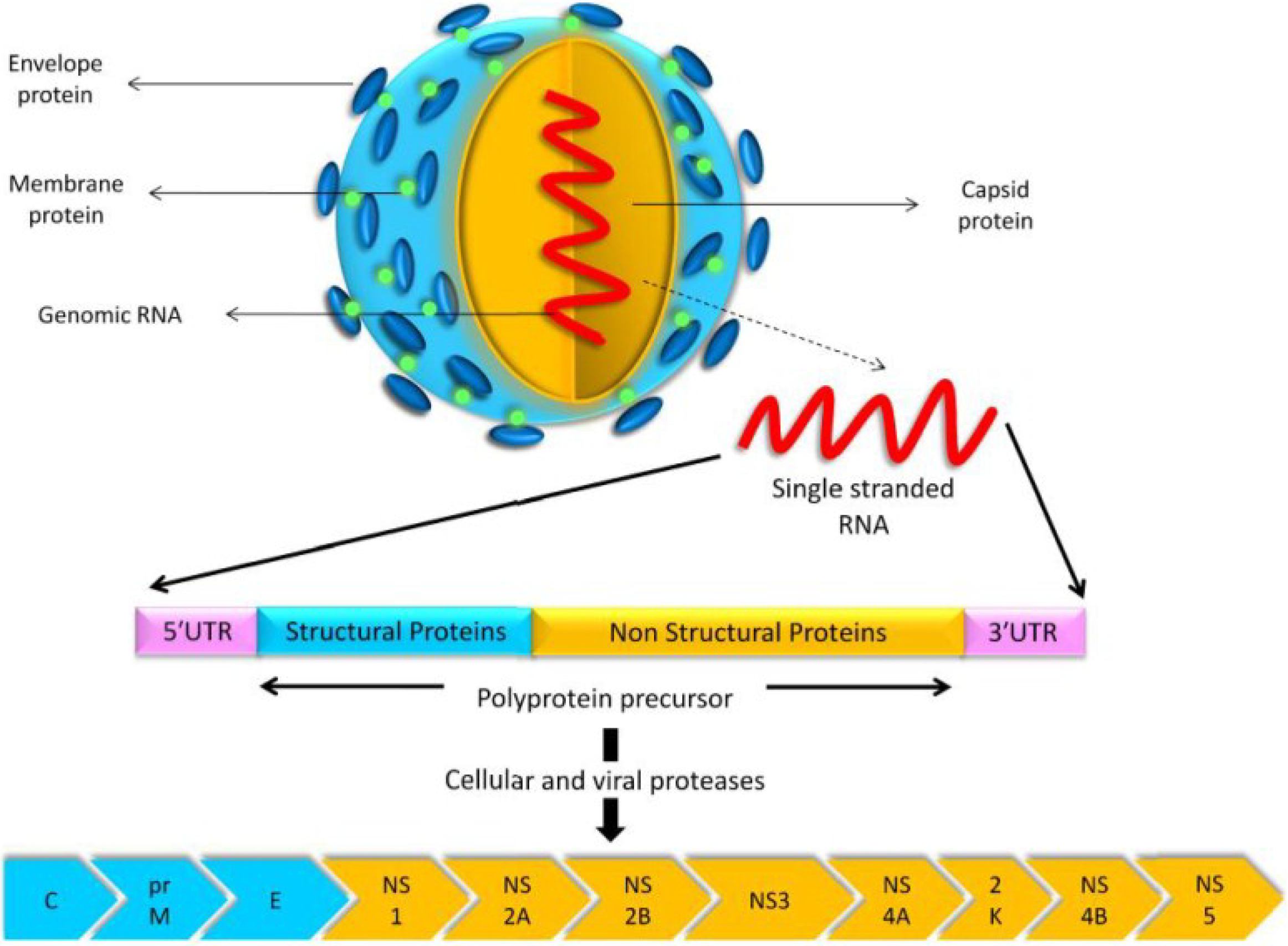

Virus classification
- (unranked): Virus
- Realm: Riboviria
- Kingdom: Orthornavirae
- Phylum: Kitrinoviricota
- Class: Flasuviricetes
- Order: Amarillovirales
- Family: Flaviviridae
- Genus: Orthoflavivirus
- Subgenus: Euflavivirus
- Species: Orthoflavivirus usutuense

= Usutu virus =

Species of virus

Usutu virus (USUV) is a flavivirus belonging to the Japanese encephalitis complex, which is an emerging zoonotic arbovirus of concern because of its pathogenicity to humans and its similarity in ecology with other emerging arboviruses such as West Nile virus. It mainly infects Culex mosquitoes and birds, while humans form a dead-end host. First identified in South Africa in 1959, the virus has caused outbreaks in birds across Europe since 1996. Nearly 50 cases in humans have been reported as of 2019, mainly in Europe. These are predominantly asymptomatic, but some people experience neurological symptoms.

== History ==
USUV was first identified by Bruce McIntosh in Culex neavei mosquitoes in South Africa in 1959, and is named after the Usutu River. The virus was later identified in Mansonia aurites mosquitoes in Uganda. In 1996, USUV was identified outside Africa for the first time, causing significant mortality among Old World blackbirds in Italy.

Only two human cases have been identified in Africa, in 1981 and 2004, with one benign and one severe case described. The first human case outside Africa was reported in Italy in 2009, where an immunocompromised patient was infected, causing encephalitis.

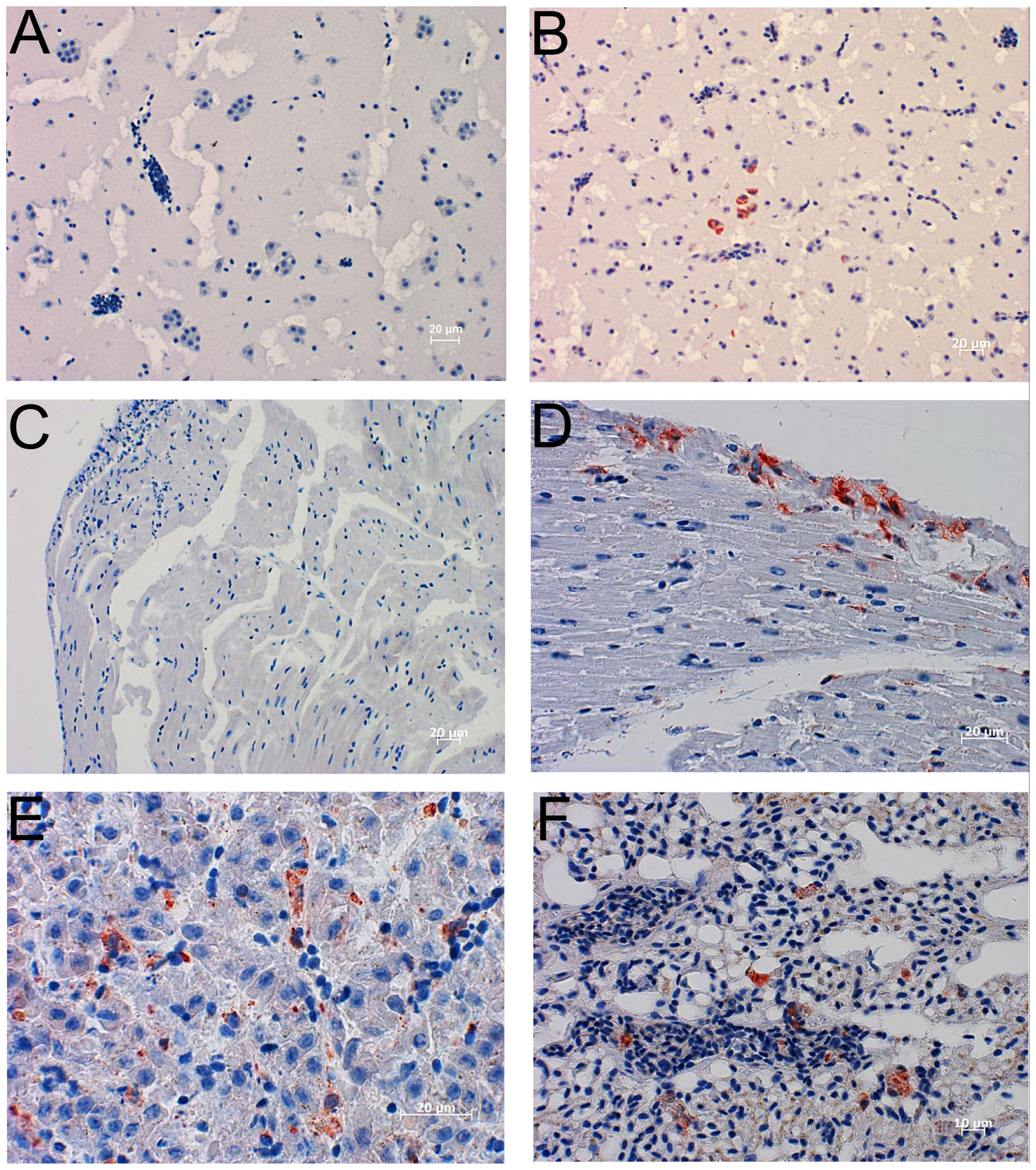
Immunohistochemistry (IHC) of USUV-uninfected (A, C) and –infected (B, D, F and F) blackbird organs using an USUV-specific murine monoclonal antibody. (A) USUV-uninfected blackbird brain. (B) USUV-infected blackbird brain showing a group of USUV-positive neurons (in red). (C) USUV-uninfected blackbird heart. (D) USUV-infected blackbird heart, USUV-positive cells are localized in the endocardium (in red). (E) USUV-infected blackbird liver, disseminated USUV-positive Kupffer cells (in red). (F) USUV-infected blackbird lung, disseminated USUV-positive cells (in red).

== Virology ==
USUV has a diameter of 40–60 nm and is enveloped. The genome is a +-sense, single-stranded RNA of 11,064 nucleotides with a 5′ N7-methylguanosine-triphosphate cap. There is one open reading frame, which encodes a 3434-amino acid polyprotein. This is processed to generate eleven proteins: three structural and eight non-structural proteins. Replication occurs in the cytoplasm of the host cell.The virus has eight lineages, five in Europe and three in Africa.

== Epidemiology and host range ==
USUV has been reported from several African countries including Burkina Faso, Central African Republic, Côte d'Ivoire, Morocco, Nigeria, Senegal, South Africa, Tunisia and Uganda, as well as from Israel. Since 1996, it has also been found in European countries, including Austria, Belgium, Croatia, Czech Republic, Denmark, France, Germany, Greece, Hungary, Italy, Serbia, Spain and Switzerland, and more recently the Netherlands, and was spreading across Europe in the late 2010s. Outbreaks are often simultaneous with those of the related West Nile virus.

USUV's host range includes primarily Culex mosquitoes and birds. The main bird hosts are blackbirds (Turdus merula), magpies (Pica pica) and owls, including the great grey owl (Strix nebulosa). In addition to humans, the virus has been isolated from Pipistrellus bats, and anti-USUV antibodies have been found in horses, dogs, deer, wild boar, rodents and shrews. Humans and horses are dead-end hosts. The vector is one of several mosquitoes that bite birds, in Europe particularly Culex pipiens. For example, a 2008–2009 survey of mosquitoes and birds in the Emilia-Romagna region of Italy detected USUV in 89 C. pipiens pools and in 2 Aedes albopictus pools, suggesting the possible involvement of A. albopictus in the virus cycle. The virus was also found in twelve wild birds, primarily Eurasian magpies (P. pica), hooded crows (Corvus cornix), and Eurasian jays (Garrulus glandarius). In Africa multiple Culex species are involved, as well as several species of Aedes and other mosquitoes.

In 2020 the virus was detected in London, and has spread in wild birds since.

In 2024 the virus was detected in blackbirds in Denmark for the first time.

== Disease ==
Two cases of symptomatic infection in humans have been reported from Africa, with fever and skin rash but no neurological symptoms. In Europe, 46 infections were detected up to 2019; these were mainly asymptomatic, but neurological symptoms including encephalitis and meningoencephalitis have been observed.

The virus is highly pathogenic in birds, causing central nervous system symptoms, enlargement of the liver and spleen, and infiltration by inflammatory cells in a wide range of organs.
