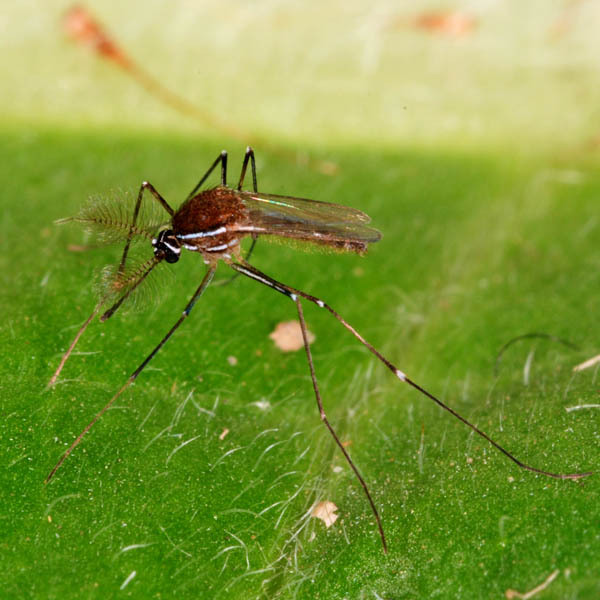
- Uranotaenia unguiculata

Scientific classification
- Kingdom: Animalia
- Phylum: Arthropoda
- Class: Insecta
- Order: Diptera
- Family: Culicidae
- Tribe: Uranotaeniini
- Genus: Uranotaenia; Lynch Arribálzaga, 1891

Type species
- Uranotaenia pulcherrima Lynch Arribálzaga, 1891

Diversity
- ≥270 species

= Uranotaenia =

Tribe and genus of mosquitoes

Uranotaenia is a genus of mosquitoes containing at least 270 species. It is the only member of the tribe Uranotaeniini. Larvae of this genus are distinctive among the Culicinae because they rest nearly parallel to the water surface rather than perpendicular to it, a posture similar to the Anophelinae, though unlike the Anophelinae they retain a functional siphon.

== Subgenera ==
The genus Uranotaenia contains the following two subgenera:

- Pseudoficalbia
- Uranotaenia
