= List of Aedes species =

The mosquito genus Aedes comprises over 950 known species, distributed worldwide except in Antarctica, with a strong presence in tropical and subtropical regions.

== Species ==
=== Subgenus (Abraedes) Zavortink, 1970 ===
- Aedes papago Zavortink, 1970

=== Subgenus (Acartomyia) Theobald, 1903 ===
- Aedes mariae (Sergent and Sergent, 1903)
- Aedes phoeniciae (Coluzzi and Sabatini, 1968)
- Aedes zammitii (Theobald, 1903)

=== Subgenus (Aedes) Meigen, 1818 ===
- Aedes alexandre Gornostaeva 2005
- Aedes cinereus Meigen, 1818
- Aedes dahuricus Danilov, 1987
- Aedes dmitryi Gornostaeva, 2005
- Aedes esoensis Yamada, 1921
- Aedes geminus Peus, 1970
- Aedes mubiensis Luh and Shih, 1958
- Aedes nataliae Gornostaeva, 2005
- Aedes rossicus Dolbeskin, Gorichaja and Mitrofanova, 1930
- Aedes sasai Tanaka, Mizusawa and Saugstad, 1975
- Aedes valeryi Gornostaeva, 2005
- Aedes yamadai Sasa, Kano and Takahashi, 1950
- Aedes perditus (Leicester, 1908)

=== Subgenus (Aedimorphus) Theobald, 1903 ===
- Aedes abnormalis (Theobald, 1909)
  - Aedes abnormalis abnormalis (Theobald, 1909)
  - Aedes abnormalis kabwachensis Edwards, 1941
- Aedes aerarius McIntosh, 1975
- Aedes albodorsalis Fontenille and Brunhes, 1985
- Aedes alboscutellatus (Theobald, 1905)
- Aedes alboventralis (Theobald, 1910)
- Aedes argenteoscutellatus Carter and Wijesundara, 1948
- Aedes bambiotai Geoffroy, 1987
- Aedes bancoi Geoffroy, 1987
- Aedes bevisi Edwards, 1915)
- Aedes caecus (Theobald, 1901)
- Aedes caliginosus (Graham, 1910)
- Aedes centropunctatus (Theobald, 1913)
- Aedes culicinus Edwards, 1922
- Aedes cumminsii (Theobald, 1903)
  - Aedes cumminsii cumminsii (Theobald, 1903)
  - Aedes cumminsii mesosticus Harbach, 2018
- Aedes dalzieli (Theobald, 1910)
- Aedes davidi Basio, 1971
- Aedes dentatus (Theobald, 1904)
- Aedes domesticus (Theobald, 1901)
- Aedes durbanensis Theobald, 1903)
  - Aedes durbanensis angolae Ribeiro and da Cunha Ramos, 1974
  - Aedes durbanensis durbanensis Theobald, 1903
- Aedes ebogoensis Rickenbach and Ferrara, 1965
- Aedes eritreae Lewis, 1942
- Aedes fowleri (de Charmoy, 1908)
- Aedes gibbinsi Edwards, 1935
- Aedes gouldi Reinert, 1972
- Aedes hirsutus (Theobald, 1901)
  - Aedes hirsutus adenensis Edwards, 1941
  - Aedes hirsutus hirsutus Theobald, 1901
- Aedes holocinctus Edwards, 1941
- Aedes jamesi Edwards, 1914)
- Aedes karooensis Muspratt, 1961
- Aedes leesoni Edwards, 1932
- Aedes leptolabis Edwards, 1936
  - Aedes leptolabis talangayensis Cornel, Kowo & Mayi, 2023
- Aedes leucarthrius (Speiser, 1909)
- Aedes longiseta Edwards, 1936
- Aedes lowisii (Theobald, 1910)
- Aedes mansouri Qutubuddin, 1959
- Aedes masoalensis Fontenille and Brunhes, 1985
- Aedes mathioti Fontenille and Brunhes, 1985
- Aedes mattinglyi Hamon and Rickenbach, 1954
- Aedes mediolineatus (Theobald,1901)
- Aedes natronius Edwards, 1932
- Aedes nigricephalus (Theobald, 1901)
- Aedes nigrostriatus (Barraud, 1927)
- Aedes oakleyi Stone, 1939
- Aedes ochraceus (Theobald, 1901)
- Aedes orbitae Edwards, 1922
- Aedes ovazzai Hamon and Adam, 1959
- Aedes pachyurus Edwards, 1936
- Aedes pallidostriatus (Theobald, 1907)
- Aedes pampangensis (Ludlow, 1905)
- Aedes pipersalatus (Giles, 1902)
- Aedes pubescens Edwards, 1925
- Aedes punctifemoris (Ludlow, 1921)
- Aedes quasiunivittatus (Theobald, 1901)
- Aedes rickenbachi Hamon and Adam, 1959
- Aedes semlikiensis van Someren, 1950
- Aedes senyavinensis Knight and Hurlbut, 1949
- Aedes stenoetrus (Theobald, 1907)
- Aedes subdentatus Edwards, 1936
- Aedes syntheticus Barraud, 1928
- Aedes taeniorhynchoides (Christophers, 1911)
- Aedes tauffliebi Rickenbach and Ferrara, 1965
- Aedes tricholabis Edwards, 1941
  - Aedes tricholabis bwamba van Someren, 1950
  - Aedes tricholabis tricholabis Edwards, 1941
- Aedes trimaculatus (Theobald,1905)
- Aedes trukensis Bohart, 1957
- Aedes vexans (Meigen, 1830) –vexans mosquito
  - Aedes vexans arabiensis Patton, 1905
  - Aedes vexans nipponii Theobald, 1907
  - Aedes vexans nocturnus Theobald, 1903
  - Aedes vexans vexans Meigen, 1830
- Aedes wigglesworthi Edwards ,1941
- Aedes suzannae Boussès, 2022
- Aedes stenostylus (Comel, Kowo & Mayi, 2023)

=== Subgenus (Alanstonea) Mattingly, 1960 ===
- Aedes brevitibia (Edwards, 1914)
- Aedes treubi (de Meijere, 1910)

=== Subgenus (Albuginosus) Reinert, 1987 ===
- Aedes capensis Edwards, 1924
- Aedes gilliesi van Someren, 1962
- Aedes haworthi Edwards, 1923
- Aedes kapretwae Edwards, 1941
- Aedes kennethi Muspratt, 1956
- Aedes marshallii (Theobald, 1901)
- Aedes ngong van Someren, 1950
- Aedes stokesi Evans, 1929
- Aedes teesdalei van Someren, 1954

=== Subgenus (Ayurakitia) Thurman, 1954 ===
- Aedes griffithi (Thurman, 1954)
- Aedes peytoni Reinert, 1972

=== Subgenus (Aztecaedes) Zavortink, 1972 ===
- Aedes ramirezi Vargas and Downs, 1950

=== Subgenus (Belkinius) Reinert, 1982 ===
- Aedes aurotaeniatus Edwards, 1922

=== Subgenus (Bifidistylus) Reinert, Harbach and Kitching, 2009 ===
- Aedes boneti Gil Collado,1936
  - Aedes boneti boneti Gil Collado, 1936
  - Aedes boneti kumbae Chwatt, 1948
- Aedes lamborni Edwards,1923

=== Subgenus (Borichinda) Harbach and Rattanarithikul, 2007 ===
- Aedes cavernicola (Rattanarithikul and Harbach, 2007)

=== Subgenus (Bothaella) Reinert, 1973 ===
- Aedes alongi Galliard and Ngu, 1947
- Aedes brownscutumus X. Dong, Zhou and L. Dong, 1999
- Aedes eldridgei Reinert, 1973
- Aedes helenae Reinert, 1973
- Aedes kleini Reinert, 1973
- Aedes manhi (Harbach and Cook, 2010)

=== Subgenus (Bruceharrisonius) Reinert, 2003 ===
- Aedes alektorovi Stackelberg, 1943
- Aedes aureostriatus (Doleschall, 1857)
- Aedes christophersi Edwards, 1922
- Aedes dooni Wattal, Bhatia and Kalra, 1958
- Aedes greeni (Theobald, 1903)
- Aedes hurlbuti Lien, 1967
- Aedes kobayashii Nakata, 1956
- Aedes okinawanus Bohart, 1946
- Aedes taiwanus Lien, 1968

=== Subgenus (Cancraedes) Edwards, 1929 ===
- Aedes cancricomes Edwards, 1922
- Aedes curtipes Edwards, 1915
- Aedes indonesiae Mattingly, 1958
- Aedes kohkutensis Mattingly, 1958
- Aedes mamoedjoensis Mattingly, 1958
- Aedes masculinus Mattingly, 1958
- Aedes palawanicus Mattingly, 1958
- Aedes penghuensis Lien, 1968
- Aedes simplex (Theobald, 1903)
- Aedes thurmanae Mattingly, 1958

=== Subgenus (Catageomyia) Theobald, 1903 ===
- Aedes adami Geoffroy, 1971
- Aedes argenteopunctatus (Theobald, 1901
- Aedes bedfordi Edwards,1936
- Aedes chamboni Cornet, 1968
- Aedes dialloi Hamon and Brengues, 1965
- Aedes falabreguesi Hamon, 1957
- Aedes filicis Ingram and De Meillon, 1927
- Aedes grenieri Hamon, Service, Adam and Taufflieb, 1961
- Aedes hopkinsi Edwards, 1936
- Aedes insolens Edwards, 1936
- Aedes irritans (Theobald, 1901
- Aedes lokojensis Service, 1959
- Aedes lottei Hamon and Brengues, 1965
- Aedes microstictus Edwards, 1936
- Aedes minutus (Theobald, 1901
- Aedes mixtus Edwards, 1936
- Aedes mutilus Edwards, 1936
- Aedes nyounae Hamon and Adam, 1959
- Aedes phyllolabis Edwards, 1929
- Aedes pseudotarsalis van Someren, 1946
- Aedes puntothoracis (Theobald, 1909
- Aedes reali Hamon and Adam, 1959
- Aedes smithburni van Someren, 1950
- Aedes stenoscutus Edwards, 1912
- Aedes tarsalis (Newstead, 1907
- Aedes veeniae McIntosh, 1975
- Aedes wendyae Service, 1959
- Aedes yangambiensis De Meillon and Lavoipierre, 1944
- Aedes yvonneae Edwards, 1941

=== Subgenus (Catatassomyia) Dyar and Shannon, 1925 ===
- Aedes meronephada (Dyar and Shannon, 1925)

=== Subgenus (Christophersiomyia) Barraud, 1923 ===
- Aedes annulirostris (Theobald, 1905)
- Aedes chionodes Belkin, 1962
- Aedes gombakensis Mattingly, 1959
- Aedes ibis Barraud, 1931
- Aedes thomsoni (Theobald, 1905)

=== Subgenus (Coetzeemyia) Huang, Mathis and Wilkerson, 2010 ===
- Aedes fryeri (Theobald, 1912)

=== Subgenus (Collessius) Reinert, Harbach and Kitching, 2006 ===
- Aedes banksi Edwards, 1922
- Aedes elsiae (Barraud, 1923)
- Aedes elsiae vicarius Lien, 1968
- Aedes hatorii Yamada, 1921
- Aedes macdougalli Edwards, 1922
- Aedes macfarlanei (Edwards, 1914)
- Aedes ningheensis Lei, 1989
- Aedes pseudotaeniatus (Giles, 1901)
- Aedes shortii (Barraud, 1923)
- Aedes tonkinensis Galliard and Ngu, 1947

=== Subgenus (Cornetius) Huang, 2005 ===
- Aedes cozi Cornet, 1973

=== Subgenus (Dahliana) Reinert, Harbach and Kitching, 2006 ===
- Aedes echinus (Edwards, 1920)
- Aedes geniculatus (Olivier, 1791) – tree hole mosquito
- Aedes gilcolladoi(Sánchez-Covisa, Rodríguez Rodríguez and Guillén Llera, 1985)

=== Subgenus (Danielsia) Theobald, 1904 ===
- Aedes albotaeniatus (Leicester, 1904)
- Aedes harperi Knight, 1948
- Aedes lepchanus (Barraud, 1923)

=== Subgenus (Dendroskusea) Edwards, 1929 ===
- Aedes kanarensis Edwards, 1934
- Aedes micropterus (Giles, 1901)
- Aedes periskelatus (Giles, 1902)
- Aedes ramachandrai Reuben, 1967
- Aedes reginae Edwards, 1922

=== Subgenus (Diceromyia) Theobald, 1911 ===
- Aedes adersi (Edwards, 1917)
- Aedes bananea (Wolfs, 1958)
- Aedes cordellieri Huang, 1986
- Aedes fascipalpis (Edwards, 1912)
- Aedes flavicollis Edwards, 1928
- Aedes furcifer (Edwards, 1913)
- Aedes mefouensis Ferrara, 1974
- Aedes taylori (Edwards, 1936)

=== Subgenus (Dobrotworkyius) Reinert, Harbach and Kitching, 2006 ===
- Aedes alboannulatus (Macquart, 1850)

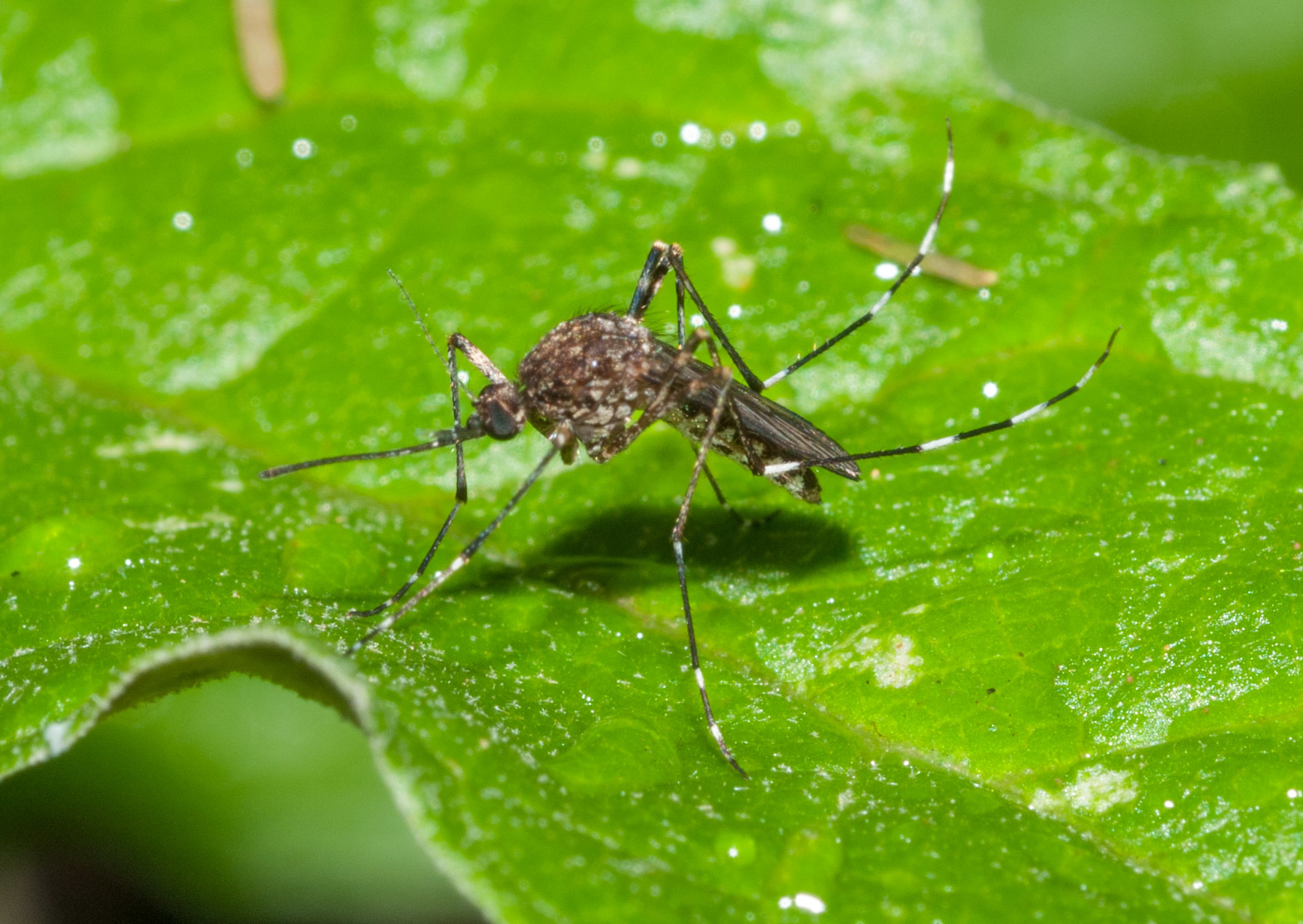
A. alboannulatus

- Aedes milsoni (Taylor, 1915)
- Aedes occidentalis (Skuse, 1889)
- Aedes rubrithorax (Macquart, 1850)

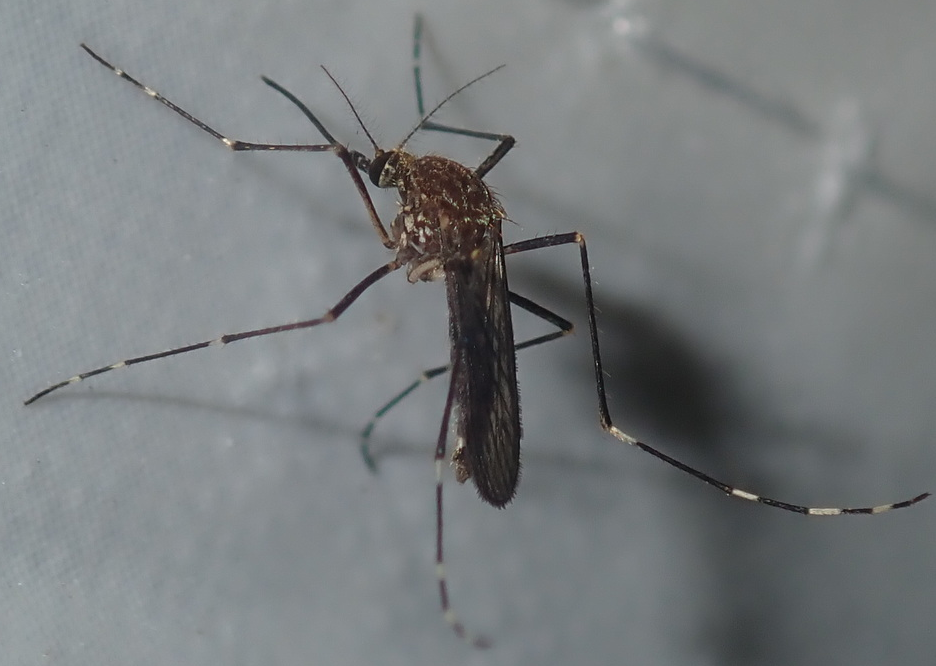
A. rubrithorax

- Aedes rupestris Dobrotworsky, 1959
- Aedes subbasalis Dobrotworsky, 1962
- Aedes tubbutiensis Dobrotworsky, 1959

=== Subgenus (Downsiomyia) Vargas, 1950 ===
- Aedes rajaveli (Natarajan, Gopalakrishnan, Kumar & Kumar, 2022)
- Aedes albolateralis (Theobald, 1908)
- Aedes alboniveus Barraud, 1934
- Aedes axitiosus Kulasekera, Knight and Harbach, 1990
- Aedes dorseyi Knight, 1946
- Aedes ganapathi Colless, 1958
- Aedes harinasutai Knight, 1978
- Aedes idjenensis Brug, 1934
- Aedes inermis Colless, 1958
- Aedes lacteus Knight, 1946
- Aedes laoagensis Knight, 1946
- Aedes leonis Colless, 1958
- Aedes litoreus Colless, 1958
- Aedes mikrokopion Knight and Harrison, 1988
- Aedes mjobergi (Edwards, 1926)
- Aedes mohani Knight, 1969
- Aedes nipponicus La Casse and Yam
- Aedes nippononiveus Sasa and Nakahashi, 1952
- Aedes nishikawai Tanaka, Mizusawa and Saugstad, 1979
- Aedes niveoides Barraud, 1934
- Aedes niveus (Ludlow, 1903)
- Aedes novoniveus Barraud, 1934
- Aedes omorii Lien, 1968
- Aedes pexus Colless, 1958
- Aedes pseudoniveus (Theobald, 1905)
- Aedes saperoi Knight, 1946
- Aedes shehzadae Qutubuddin, 1972
- Aedes sinensis Chow, 1950
- Aedes subniveus Edwards, 1922
- Aedes vanus Colless, 1958
- Aedes watteni Lien, 1968

=== Subgenus (Edwardsaedes) Belkin, 1962 ===
- Aedes bekkui Mogi, 1977
- Aedes imprimens (Walker, 1860)
- Aedes pingpaensis Chang, 1965

=== Subgenus (Elpeytonius) Reinert, Harbach and Kitching, 2009 ===
- Aedes apicoannulatus (Edwards, 1912)
- Aedes simulans (Newstead and Carter, 1911)

=== Subgenus (Finlaya) Theobald, 1903 ===
- Aedes alocasicola Marks, 1947
- Aedes ananae Knight and Laffoon, 1946
- Aedes avistylus Brug, 1939
- Aedes bougainvillensis Marks, 1947
- Aedes burnetti Belkin, 1962
- Aedes croceus Knight and Laffoon, 1946
- Aedes dobrotworskyi Marks, 1958
- Aedes fijiensis Marks, 1947
- Aedes flavipennis (Giles, 1904)
- Aedes franclemonti Belkin, 1962
- Aedes freycinetiae Laird, 1957
- Aedes fuscipalpis Belkin, 1962
- Aedes fuscitarsis Belkin, 1962
- Aedes gahnicola Marks, 1947

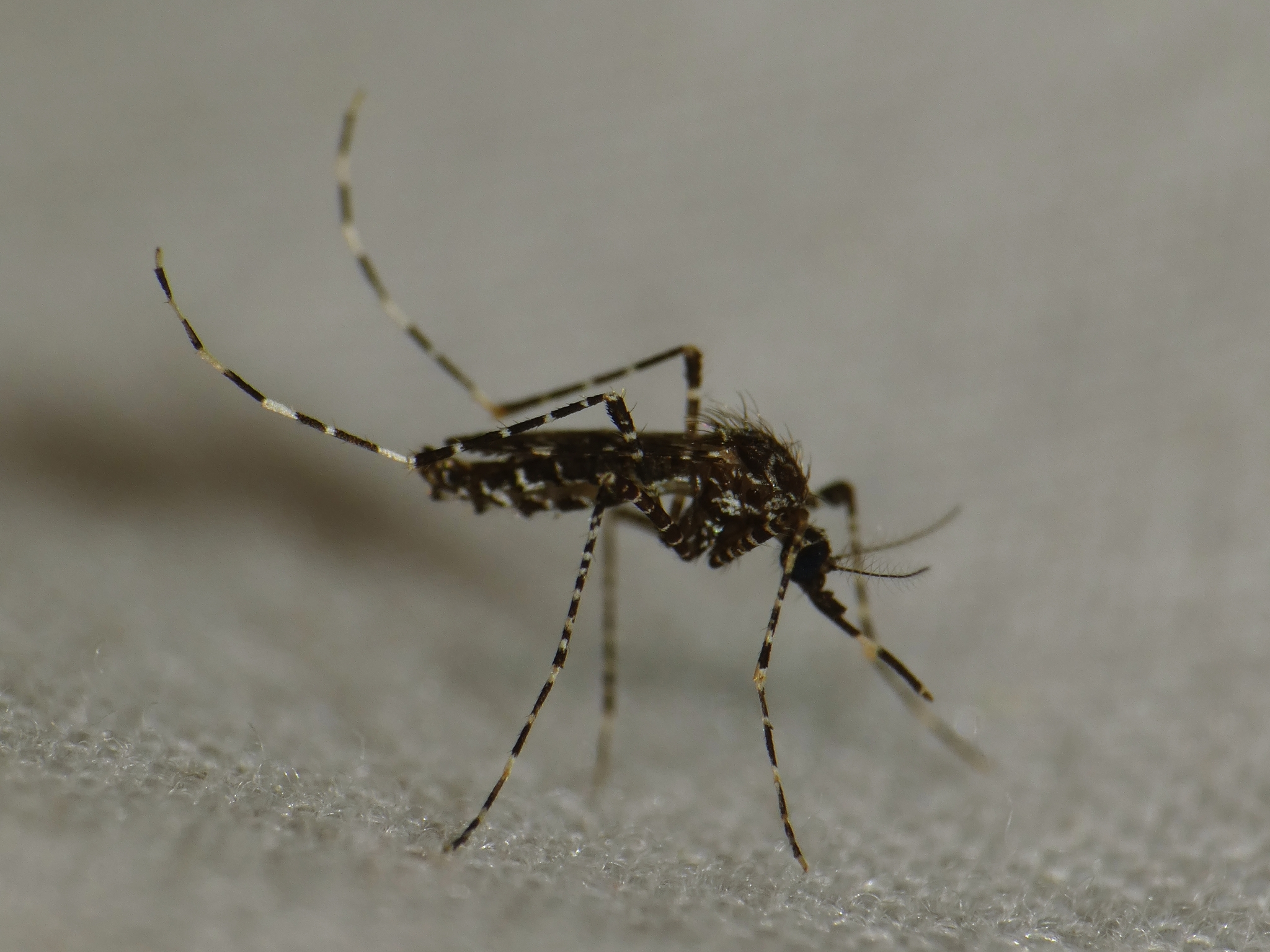
A. gahnicola

- Aedes gani Bonne- Wepster, 1940
- Aedes gressitti Bohart, 1957
- Aedes hollingsheadi Belkin, 1962
- Aedes horotoi Taylor, 1972
- Aedes hui Bohart, 1957
- Aedes josephinae Marks, 1958
- Aedes knighti Stone and Bohart, 1944
- Aedes kochi (Dönitz, 1901)

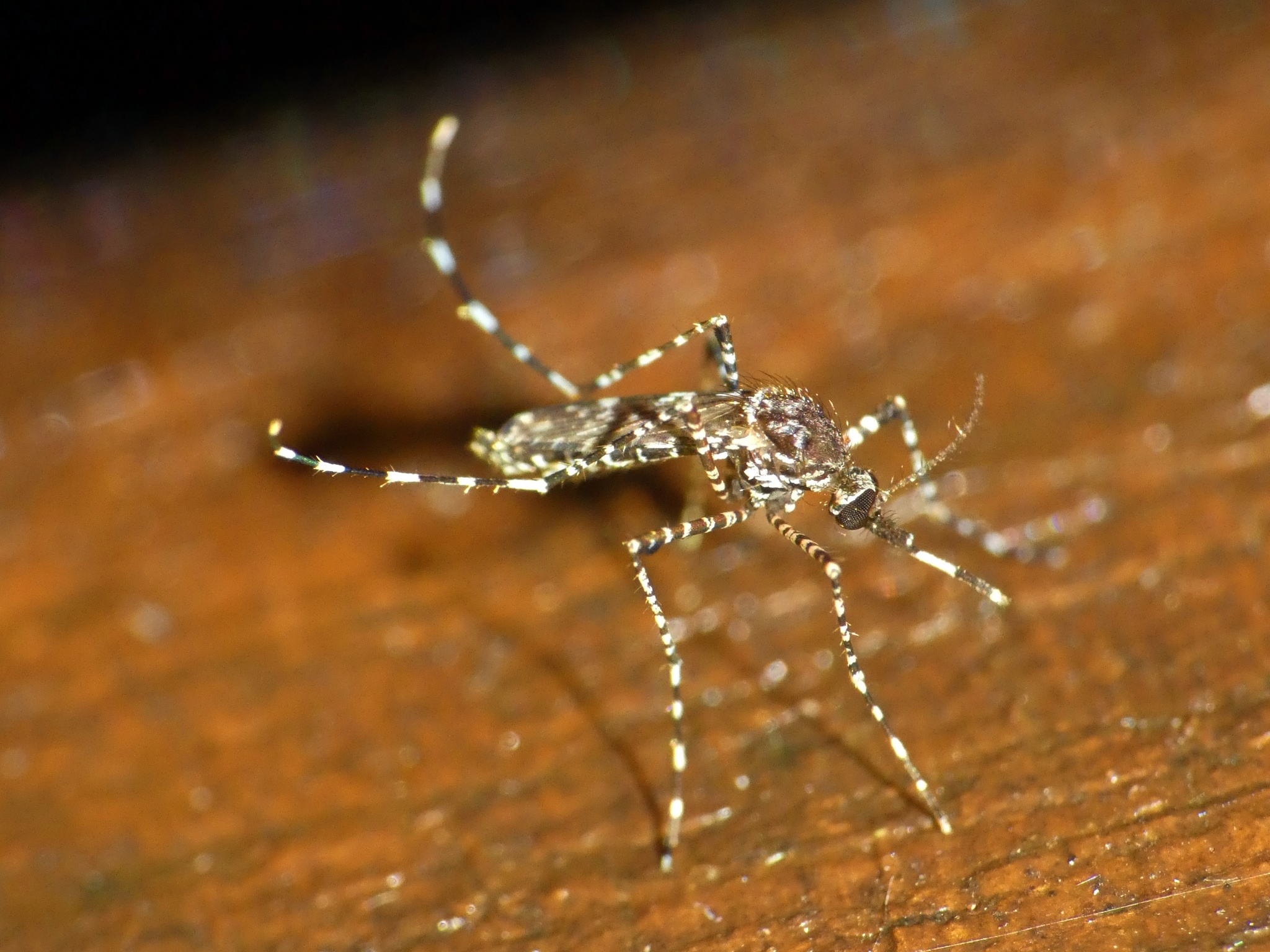
A. kochi

- Aedes lewelleni Starkey and Webb, 1946
- Aedes luteus (Ludlow, 1905)
- Aedes maffii Taylor and Tenorio, 1974
- Aedes medleri Knight and Laffoon, 1946
- Aedes neogeorgianus Belkin, 1962
- Aedes oceanicus Belkin, 1962
- Aedes poicilius (Theobald, 1903)

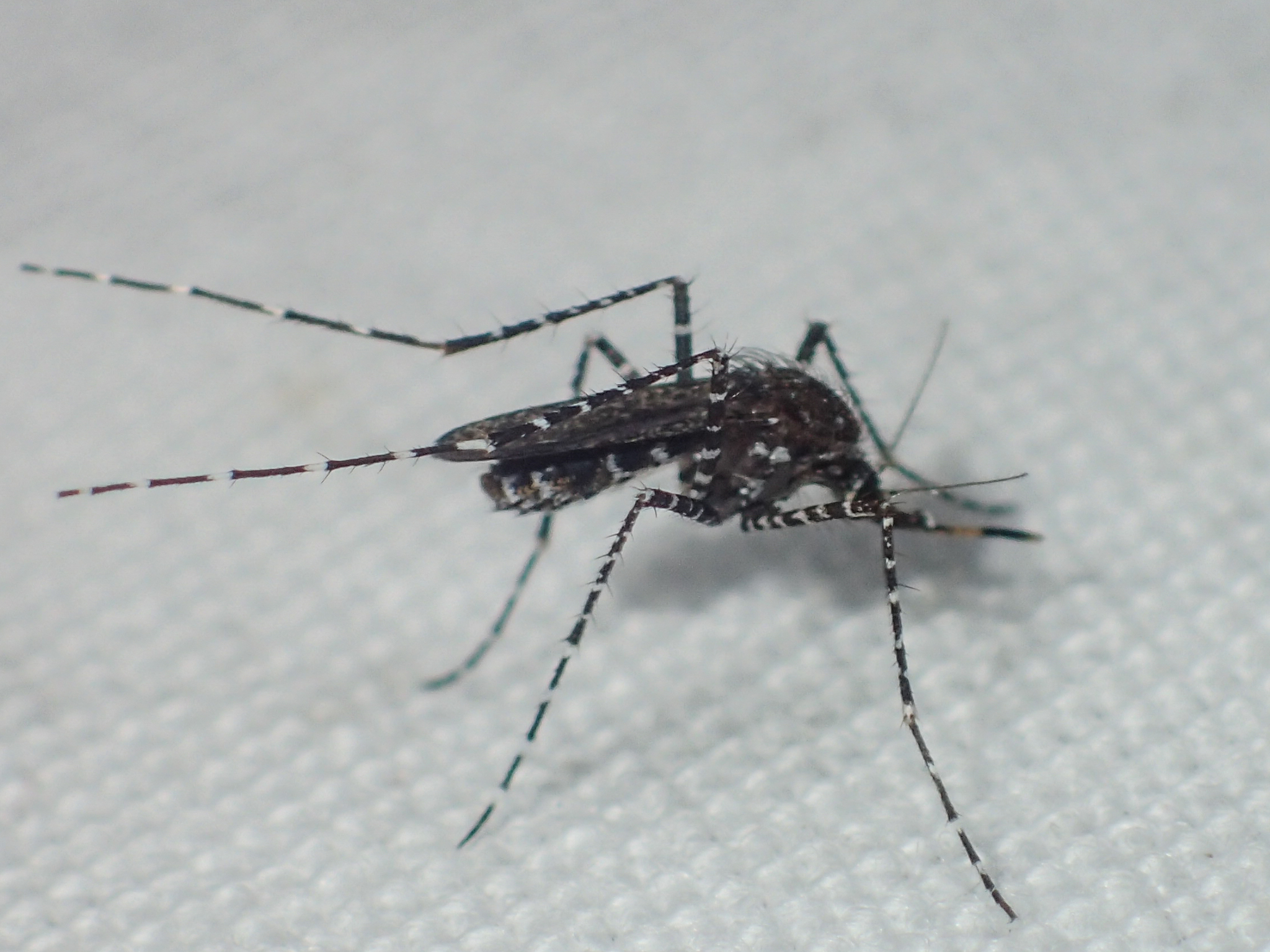
A. poicilius

- Aedes samoanus (Grünberg, 1913)
- Aedes schlosseri Belkin, 1962
- Aedes solomonis Stone and Bohart, 1944
- Aedes sorsogonensis Bañez and Jueco, 1966
- Aedes stonei Knight and Laffoon, 1946
- Aedes tutuilae Ramalingam and Belkin, 1965
- Aedes wallacei Edwards, 1926

=== Subgenus (Fredwardsius) Reinert, 2000 ===
- Aedes vittatus (Bigot, 1861)

=== Subgenus (Georgecraigius) Reinert, Harbach and Kitching, 2006 ===
- Aedes atropalpus (Coquillett, 1902)
- Aedes epactius (Dyar and Knab, 1908)
- Aedes fluviatilis (Lutz in Bourroul, 1904)

=== Subgenus (Geoskusea) Edwards, 1929 ===
- Aedes baisasi Knight and Hull, 1951
- Aedes becki Belkin, 1962
- Aedes daggyi Stone and Bohart, 1944
- Aedes fimbripes Edwards, 1924
- Aedes kabaenensis Brug, 1939
- Aedes longiforceps Edwards, 1929
- Aedes lunulatus King and Hoogstraal, 1946
- Aedes perryi Belkin, 1962
- Aedes timorensis (Miyagi, Toma and Lien, 2004)
- Aedes tonsus Edwards, 1924

=== Subgenus (Gilesius) Reinert, Harbach and Kitching, 2006 ===
- Aedes alius Lien, 1968
- Aedes pulchriventer (Giles, 1901)

=== Subgenus (Gymnometopa) Coquillett, 1906 ===
- Aedes mediovittatus Coquillett, 1906)

=== Subgenus (Halaedes) Belkin, 1962 ===
- Aedes ashworthi (Erichson, 1842)
- Aedes australis Edwards, 1921
- Aedes wardangensis Brust, Ballard, Driver, Hartley, Galway and Curran, 1998

=== Subgenus (Himalaius) Reinert, Harbach and Kitching, 2006 ===
- Aedes gilli (Barraud, 1924)
- Aedes simlensis Edwards, 1922

=== Subgenus (Hopkinsius) Reinert, Harbach and Kitching, 2006 ===
- Aedes albocinctus (Barraud, 1924)
- Aedes barnardi Edwards, 1924
- Aedes embuensis Edwards, 1930
- Aedes ingrami Edwards, 1930
- Aedes nyasae Edwards, 1930
- Aedes seoulensis Yamada, 1921
- Aedes wellmanii (Theobald, 1905)

=== Subgenus (Howardina) Theobald, 1903 ===
- Aedes albonotatus (Coquillett, 1906)
- Aedes allotecnon Kumm, Komp and Ruiz, 1940
- Aedes arborealis BonneWepster and Bonne, 1920
- Aedes argyrites Dyar and Nuñez Tovar, 1927
- Aedes aureolineatus Berlin, 1969
- Aedes aurites (Theobald, 1907)
- Aedes aurivittatus Cerqueira, 1943
- Aedes bahamensis Berlin, 1969
- Aedes brevis Berlin, 1969
- Aedesnbrevivittatus Berlin, 1969
- Aedes busckii (Coquillett, 1906)
- Aedes cozumelensis Díaz Nájera, 1966
- Aedes ecuadoriensis Berlin, 1969
- Aedes eleanorae Berlin, 1969
- Aedes fulvithorax (Lutz, 1904)
- Aedes grabhami (Berlin, 1969)
- Aedes guatemala Berlin, 1969
- Aedes guerrero Berlin, 1969
- Aedes inaequalis (Grabham, 1907)
- Aedes ioliota Dyar and Knab, 1913
- Aedes leei Berlin, 1969
- Aedes lorraineae Berlin, 1969
- Aedes marinkellei Berlin, 1969
- Aedes martinezi Berlin, 1969
- Aedes osornoi Berlin, 1969
- Aedes pseudodominicii Komp, 1936
- Aedes quadrivittatus (Coquillett, 1902)
- Aedes septemstriatus Dyar and Knab, 1907
- Aedes sexlineatus (Theobald, 1901)
- Aedes spinosus Berlin, 1969
- Aedes stenei Thompson, 1956
- Aedes vanemdeni Martini, 1931
- Aedes walkeri (Theobald, 1901)
- Aedes whitmorei Dunn, 1918

=== Subgenus (Huaedes) Huang, 1968 ===
- Aedes medialis (Brug, 1932)
- Aedes variepictus King and Hoogstraal, 1946
- Aedes wauensis Huang, 1968

=== Subgenus (Hulecoeteomyia) Theobald, 1904 ===
- Aedes sherki Knight, 1947
- Aedes yaeyamensis Tanaka, Mizusawa & Saugstad, 1979
- Aedes bhutanensis Somboon and Harbach, 2020
- Aedes cherrapunjensis (Natarajan, Rajavel and Jambulingam, 2016)
- Aedes chrysolineatus (Theobald, 1907)
- Aedes formosensis Yamada, 1921
- Aedes harveyi (Barraud, 1923)
- Aedes japonicus (Theobald, 1901) - Asian bush mosquito, Japanese bush mosquito
  - Aedes japonicus amamiensis Tanaka, Mizusawa and Saugstad, 1979
  - Aedes japonicus japonicus Theobald, 1901
  - Aedes japonicus shintienensis Tsai and Lien, 1950
  - Aedes japonicus yaeyamensis Tanaka, Mizusawa and Saugstad, 1979
- Aedes jugraensis (Leicester, 1908)
- Aedes koreicus (Edwards, 1917) - Korean bush mosquito
- Aedes nigrorhynchus Brug, 1931
- Aedes pallirostris Edwards, 1922
- Aedes reinerti Rattanarithikul and Harrison, 1988
- Aedes rizali (Banks, 1906)
- Aedes saxicola (Edwards, 1922)

=== Subgenus (Indusius) Edwards in Barraud, 1934 ===
- Aedes pulverulenus Edwards, 1922

=== Subgenus (Isoaedes) Reinert, 1979 ===
- Aedes cavaticus Reinert, 1979

=== Subgenus (Jarnellius) Reinert, Harbach and Kitching, 2006 ===
- Aedes deserticola Zavortink, 1970
- Aedes laguna Arnell and Nielsen, 1972
- Aedes monticola Belkin and McDonald, 1957
- Aedes sierrensis (Ludlow, 1905)-western treehole mosquito

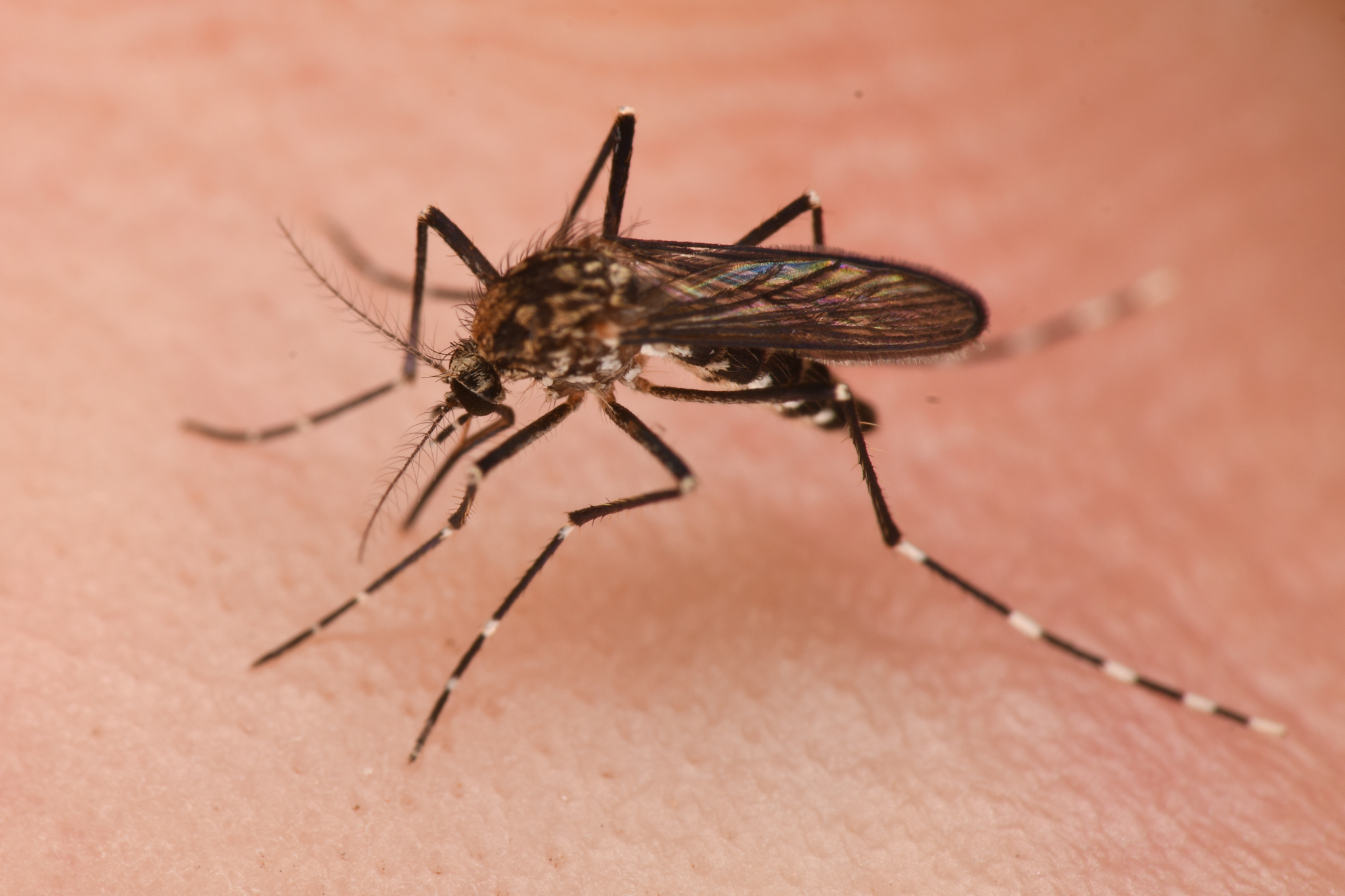
A. sierrensis

- Aedes varipalpus (Coquillett, 1902)

=== Subgenus (Jihlienius) Reinert, Harbach and Kitching, 2006 ===
- Aedes chungi Lien, 1968
- Aedes gonguoensis (Gong and Lu, 1986)
- Aedes unicinctus Edwards, 1922

=== Subgenus (Kenknightia) Reinert, 1990 ===
- Aedes dissimilierodes (X. Dong, Zhou and L. Dong, 2002)
- Aedes dissimilis (Leicester, 1908)
- Aedes gaffigani Reinert, 1990
- Aedes harbachi Reinert, 1990
- Aedes karwari (Barraud, 1924)
- Aedes lerozeboomi Reinert, 1990
- Aedes leucomeres (Giles, 1904)
- Aedes litwakae Reinert, 1990
- Aedes luzonensis Rozeboom, 1946
- Aedes paradissimilis Rozeboom, 1946
- Aedes pecori Reinert, 1990
- Aedes wilkersoni Reinert, 1990

=== Subgenus (Kompia) Aitken, 1941 ===
- Aedes purpureipes Aitken, 1941

=== Subgenus (Leptosomatomyia) Theobald, 1905 ===
- Aedes aurimargo Edwards, 1922

=== Subgenus (Levua) Stone and Bohart, 1944 ===
- Aedes geoskusea Amos, 1944

=== Subgenus (Lewnielsenius) Reinert, Harbach and Kitching, 2006 ===
- Aedes muelleri Dyar, 1920

=== Subgenus (Lorrainea) Belkin, 1962 ===
- Aedes amesii (Ludlow, 1903)
- Aedes celebicus Mattingly, 1959
- Aedes dasyorrhus King and Hoogstraal, 1946
- Aedes fumidus Edwards, 1928
- Aedes lamelliferus Bohart and Ingram, 1946

=== Subgenus (Luius) Reinert, Harbach and Kitching, 2008 ===
- Aedes fengi (Edwards, 1935)

=== Subgenus (Macleaya) Theobald, 1903 ===
- Aedes calabyi Marks, 1963
- Aedes elchoensis Taylor, 1929
- Aedes humeralis Edwards, 1922
- Aedes littlechildi Taylor, 1933
- Aedes macmillani Marks, 1964
- Aedes moloiensis Taylor, 1929
- Aedes spinosipes Edwards, 1922
- Aedes stoneorum Marks, 1977
- Aedes tremulus (Theobald, 1903)
- Aedes tulliae (Taylor, 1929)
- Aedes wattensismm Taylor, 1929

=== Subgenus (Molpemyia) Theobald, 1910 ===
- Aedes auridorsum Edwards, 1922
- Aedes pecuniosus Edwards, 1922
- Aedes purpureus (Theobald, 1910)

=== Subgenus (Mucidus) Theobald, 1901 ===
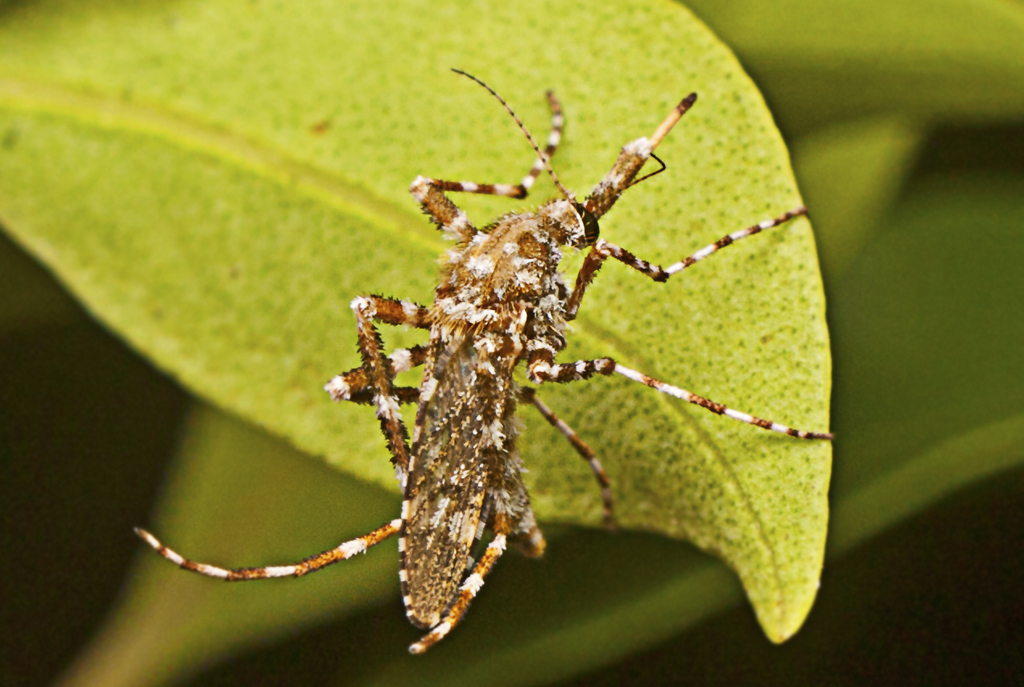
A. alternans

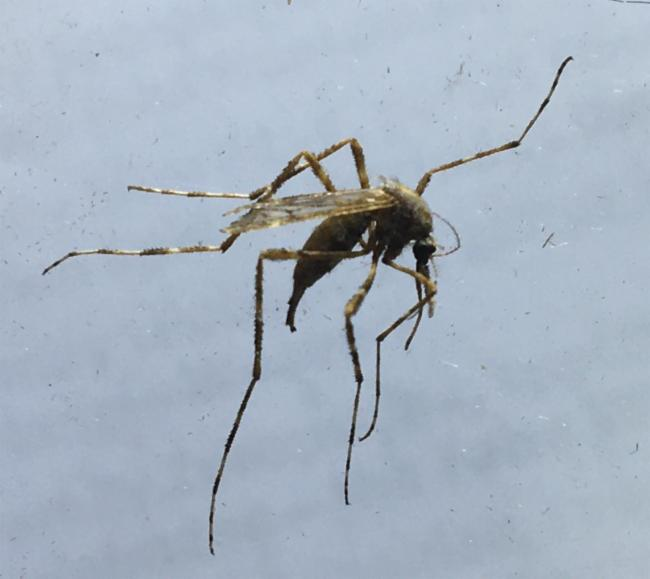
A. aurantius

- Aedes alternans (Westwood, 1835)
- Aedes aurantius (Theobald, 1907)
  - Aedes aurantius aurantius (Theobald, 1907)
  - Aedes aurantius chrysogaster (Taylor, 1927)
- Aedes ferinus (Knight, 1947)
- Aedes grahamii (Theobald, 1909)
- Aedes laniger (Wiedemann, 1820)
- Aedes lucianus Muspratt, 1959
- Aedes mucidus (Karsch, 1887)
- Aedes nigerrimus (Theobald, 1913)
- Aedes nigrescens (Edwards in Paine and Edwards, 1929)
- Aedes quadripunctis (Ludlow, 1910)
- Aedes quasiferinus Mattingly, 1961
- Aedes scatophagoides (Theobald, 1901)
- Aedes sudanensis (Theobald, 1908)
- Aedes tonkingi Gebert, 1948

=== Subgenus (Neomelaniconion) Newstead, 1907 ===
- Aedes albicosta (Edwards, 1913)
- Aedes albiradius (Le Goff, Boussès and Brunhes, 2007)
- Aedes albothorax (Theobald, 1907)
- Aedes aurovenatus Worth, 1960
- Aedes belleci (Le Goff, Boussès and Brunhes, 2007)
- Aedes bequaerti Wolfs, 1947
- Aedes bergerardi Pajot and Geoffroy, 1971
- Aedes bolense Edwards, 1936
- Aedes carteri Edwards, 1936
- Aedes circumluteolus (Theobald, 1908)
- Aedes crassiforceps Edwards, 1927
- Aedes ellinorae Edwards, 1941
- Aedes flavimargo Edwards, 1941
- Aedes fontenillei (Le Goff, Boussès and Brunhes, 2007)
- Aedes fuscinervis (Edwards, 1914)
- Aedes hylaius (Harbach, 2018)
- Aedes jamoti Hamon and Rickenbach, 1954
- Aedes lineatopennis (Ludlow, 1905)
  - Aedes lineatopennis aureus Gutsevich, 1955
  - Aedes lineatopennis lineatopennis Ludlow, 1905
- Aedes luridus McIntosh, 1971
- Aedes luteolateralis (Theobald, 1901)
- Aedes mcintoshi Huang, 1985
- Aedes monotrichus Edwards, 1936
- Aedes nigropterum (Le Goff, Boussès and Brunhes, 2007)
- Aedes palpalis (Newstead, 1907)
- Aedes pogonurus Edwards, 1936
- Aedes punctocostalis (Theobald, 1909)
- Aedes taeniarostris (Theobald, 1909
- Aedes unidentatus McIntosh, 1971

=== Subgenus (Nyctomyia) Harbach, 2013 ===
- Aedes pholeocola (Harbach in Harbach and Taai, 2014)
- Aedes biunguiculatus (Linton and Harbach, 2013)

=== Subgenus (Ochlerotatus) Lynch Arribálzaga, 1891 ===
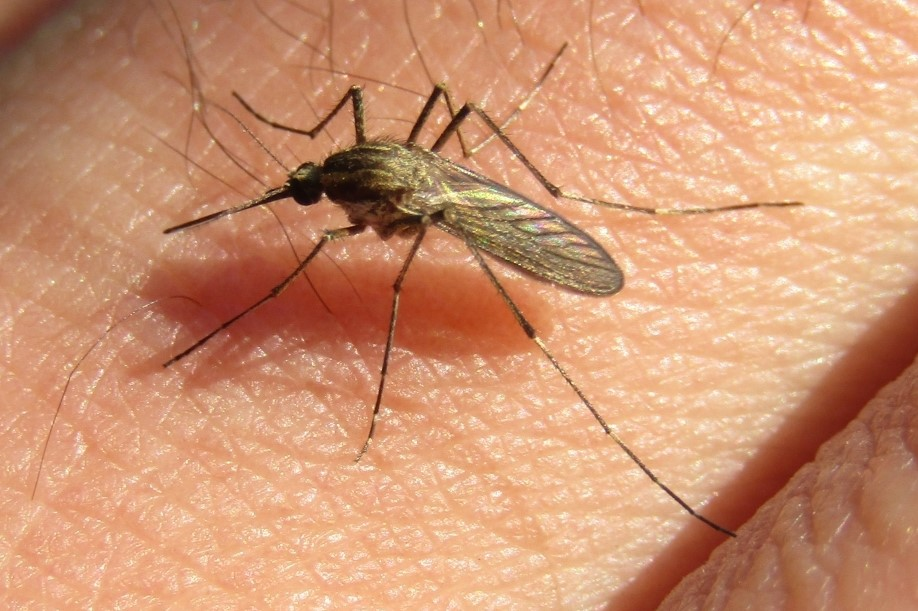
A. albifasciatus

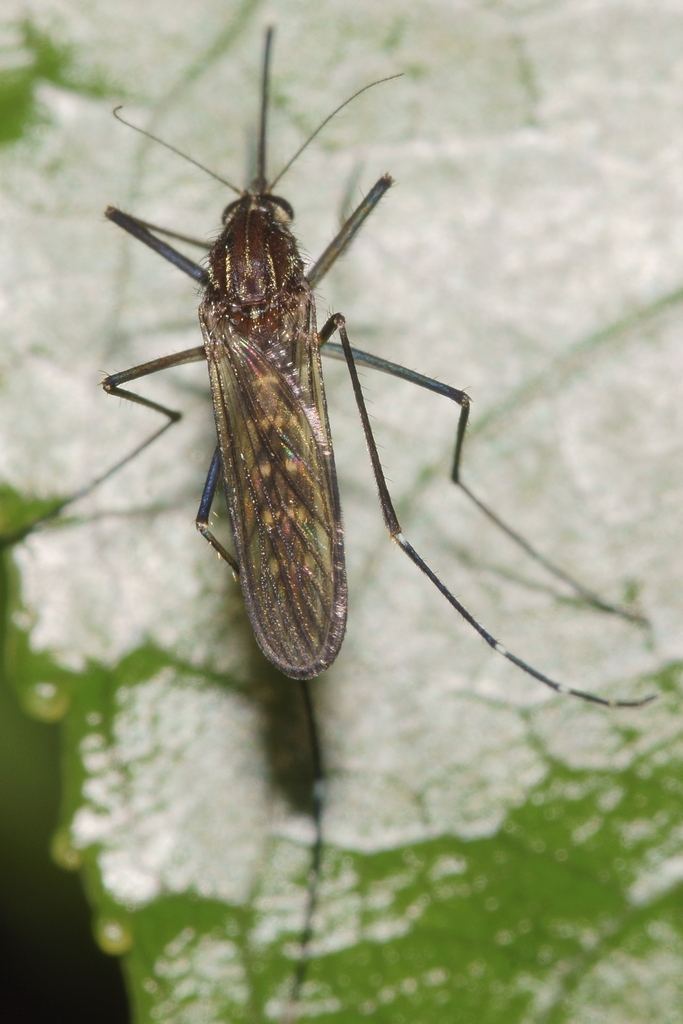
A. antipodeus

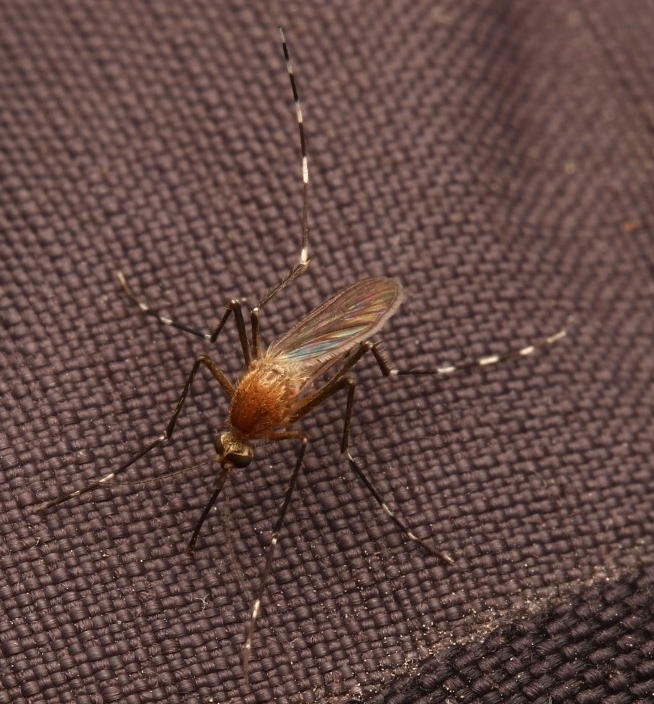
A. c. canadensis

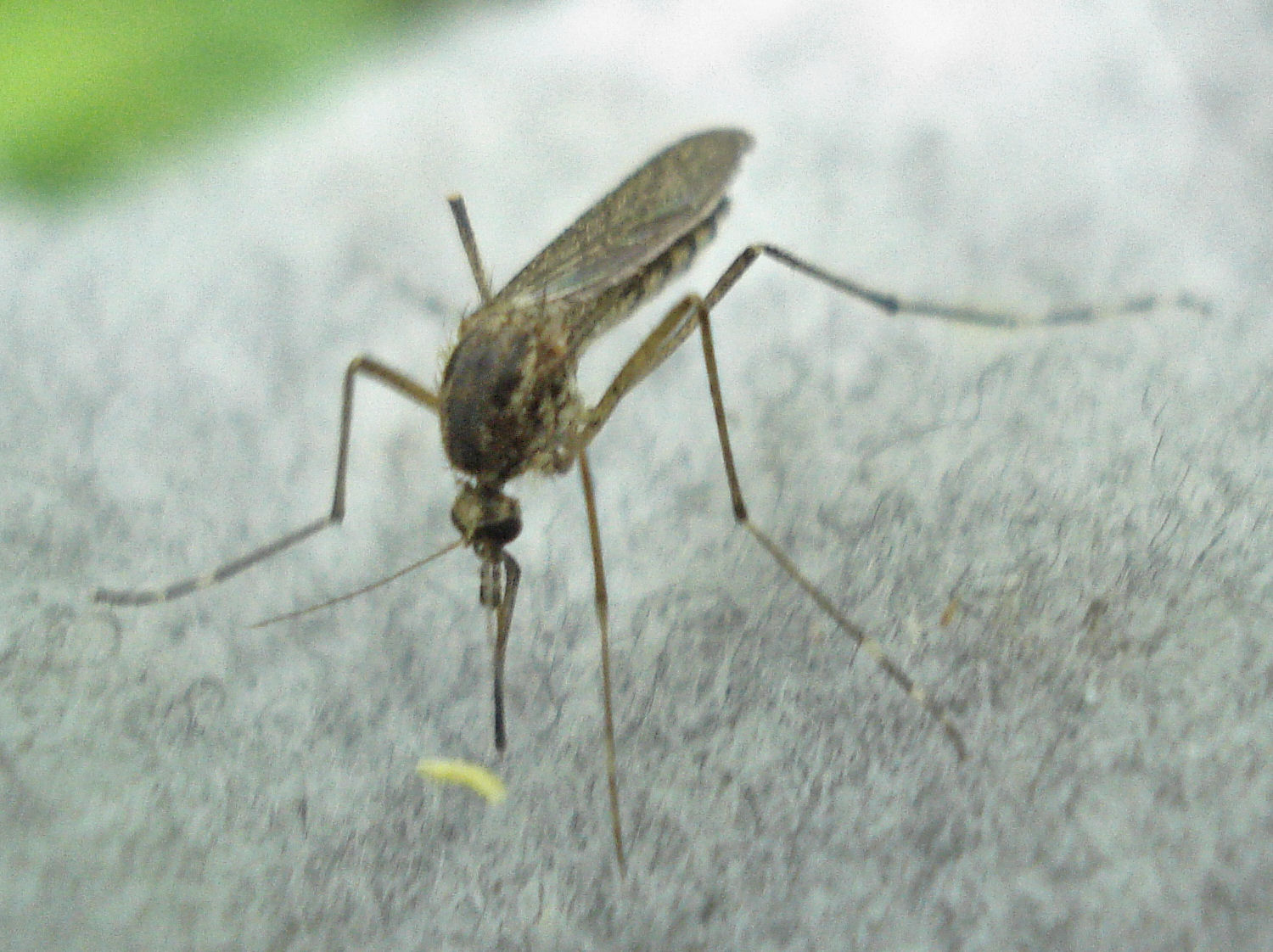
A. cantans

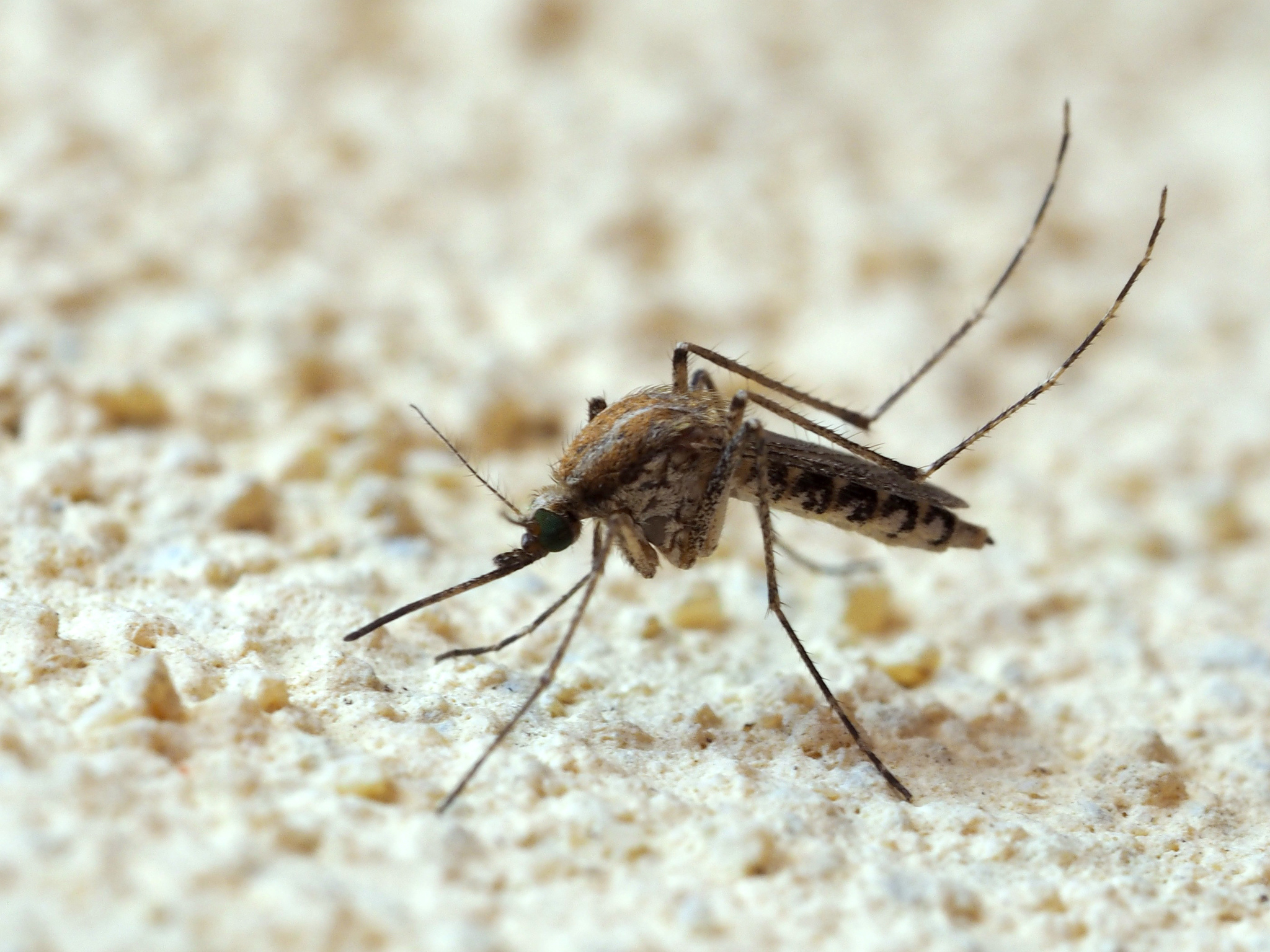
A. caspius

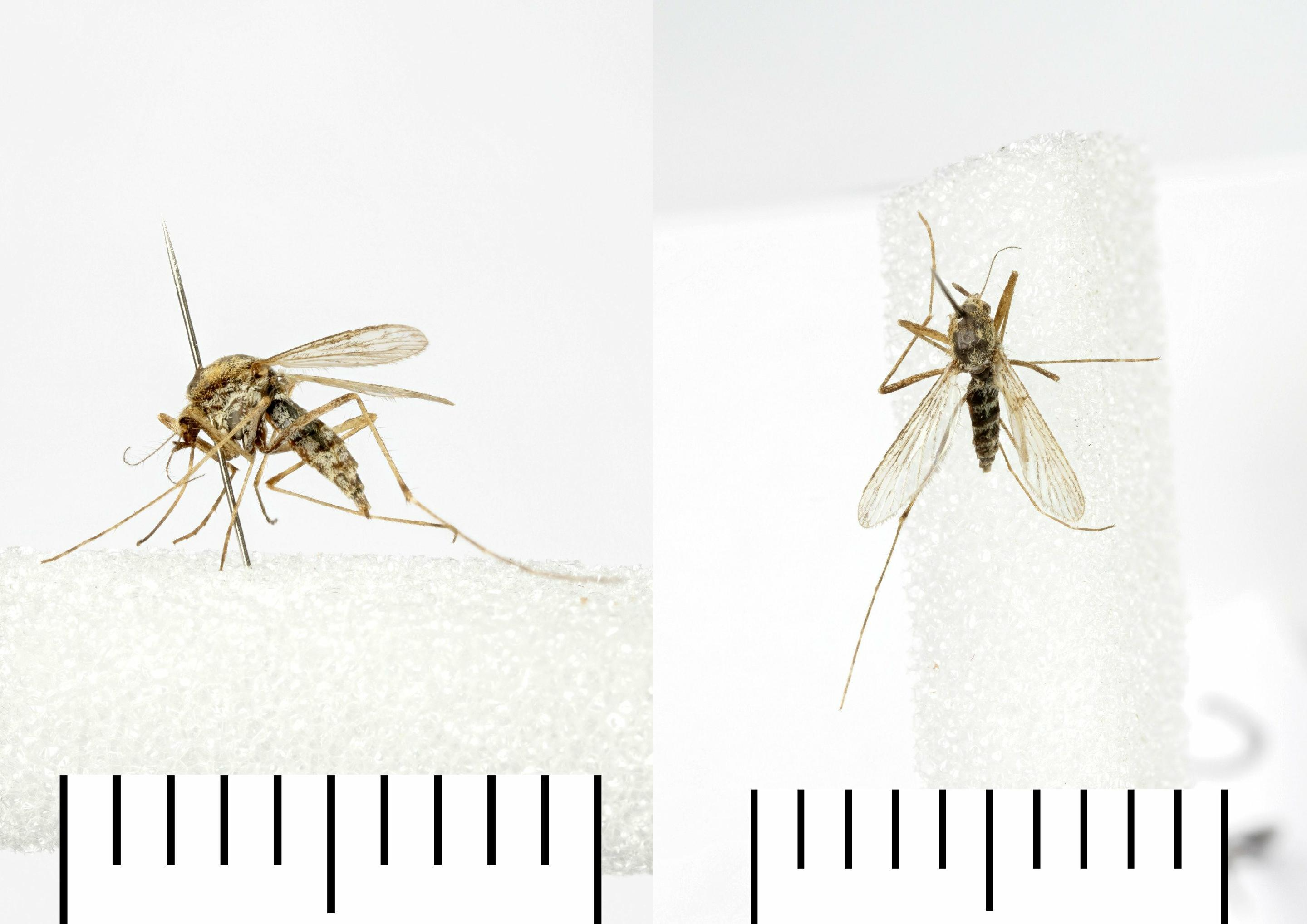
Preserved specimens of A. c. caspius

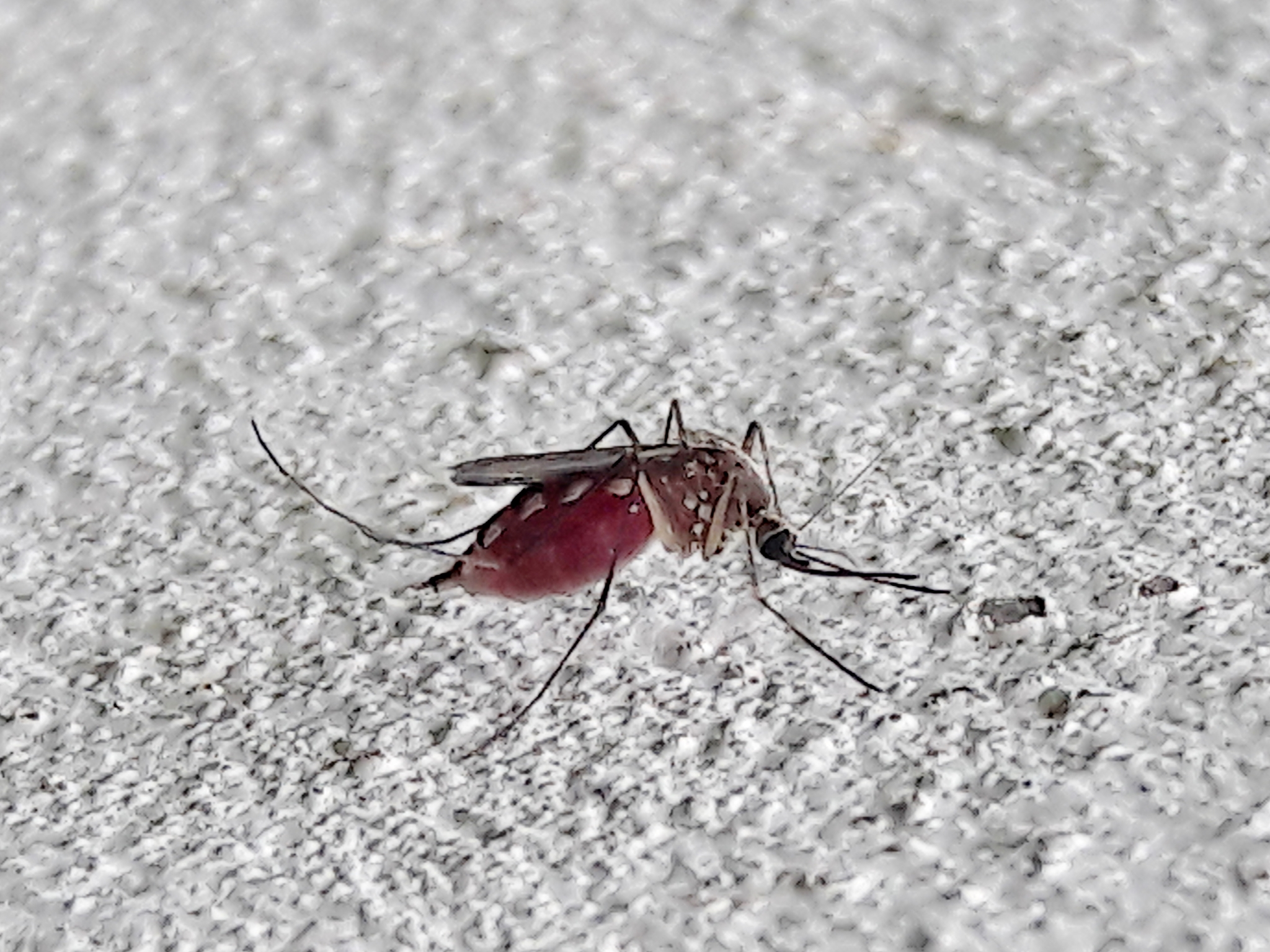
A. condolescens

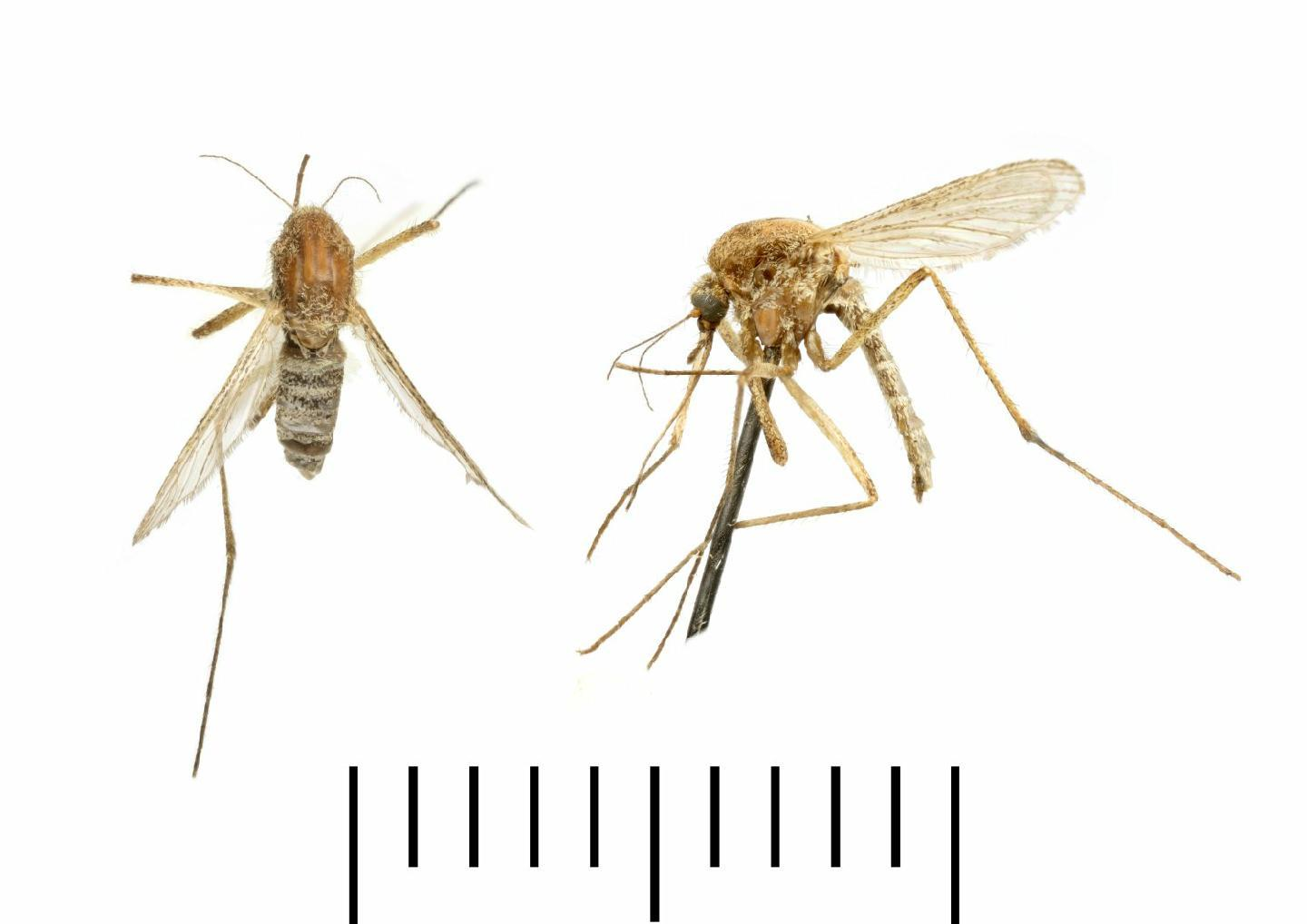
A. detritus

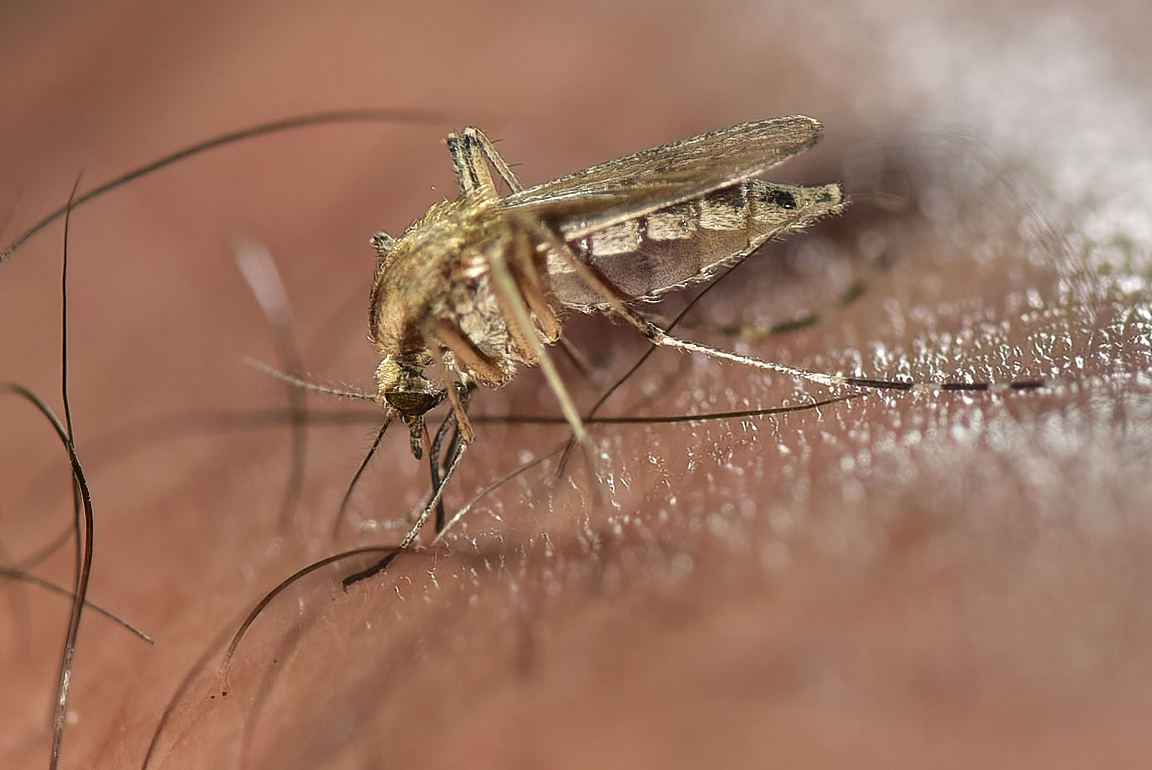
A. dorsalis

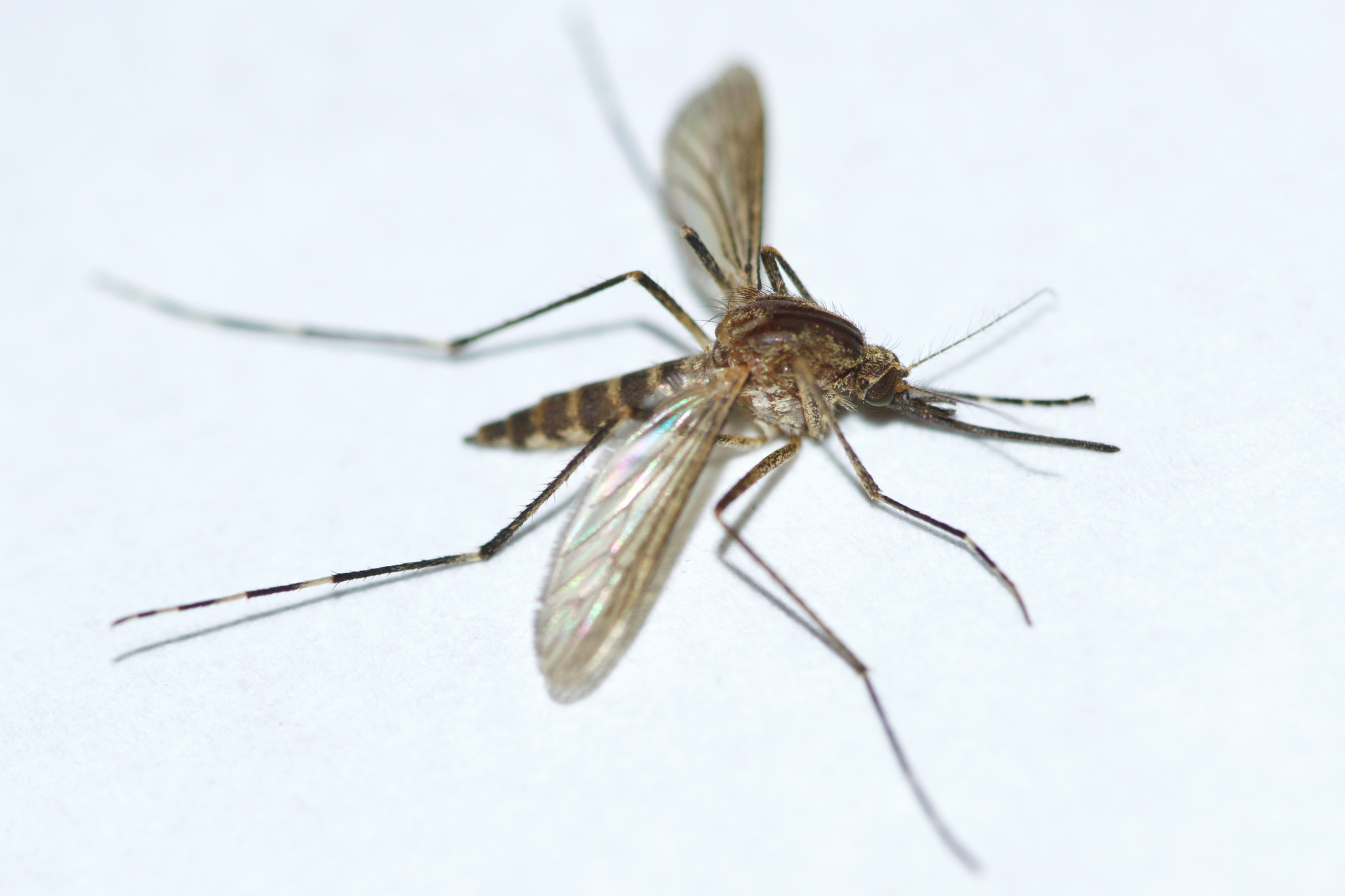
A. excrucians

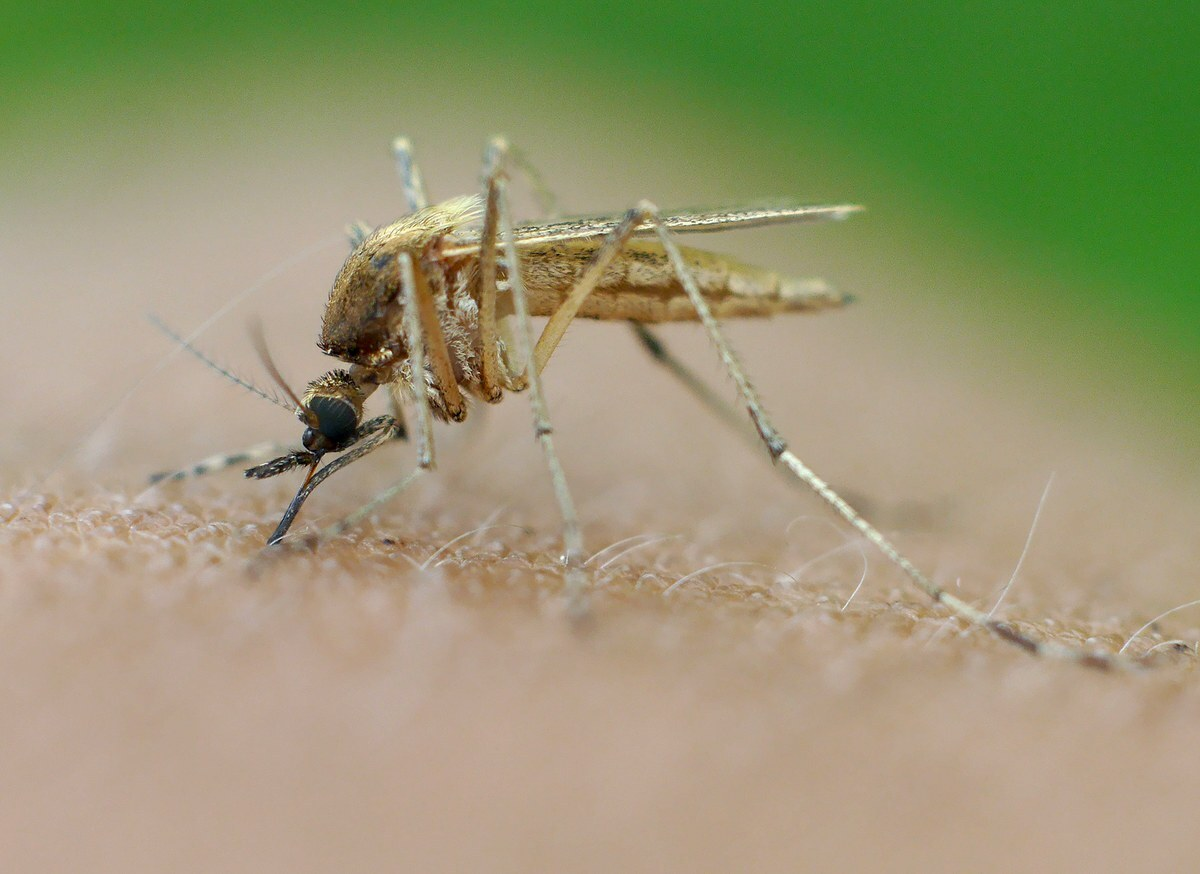
A. flavescens

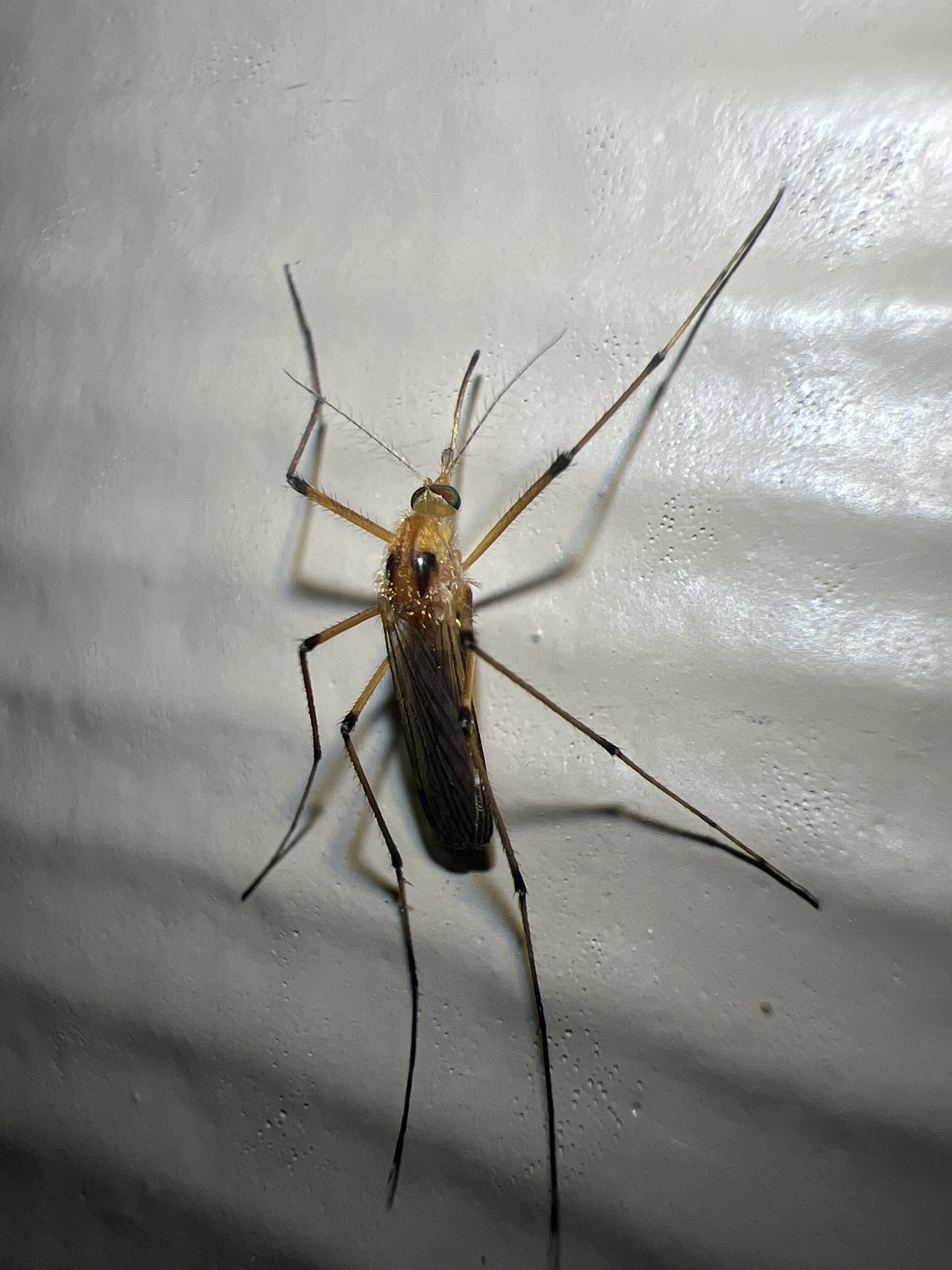
A. f. pallens

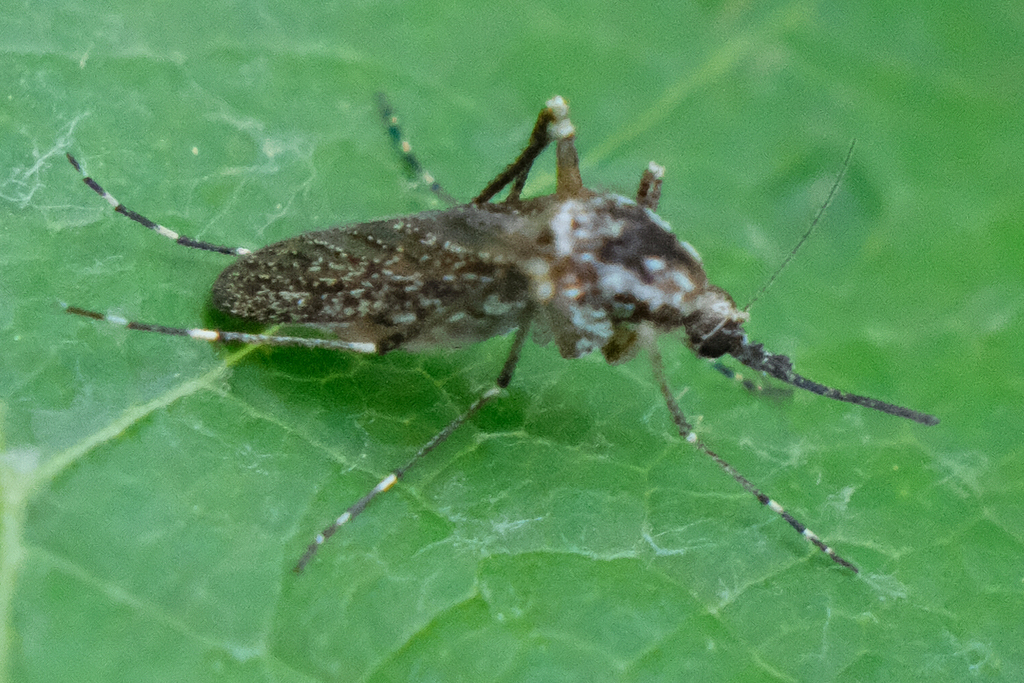
A. grossbecki

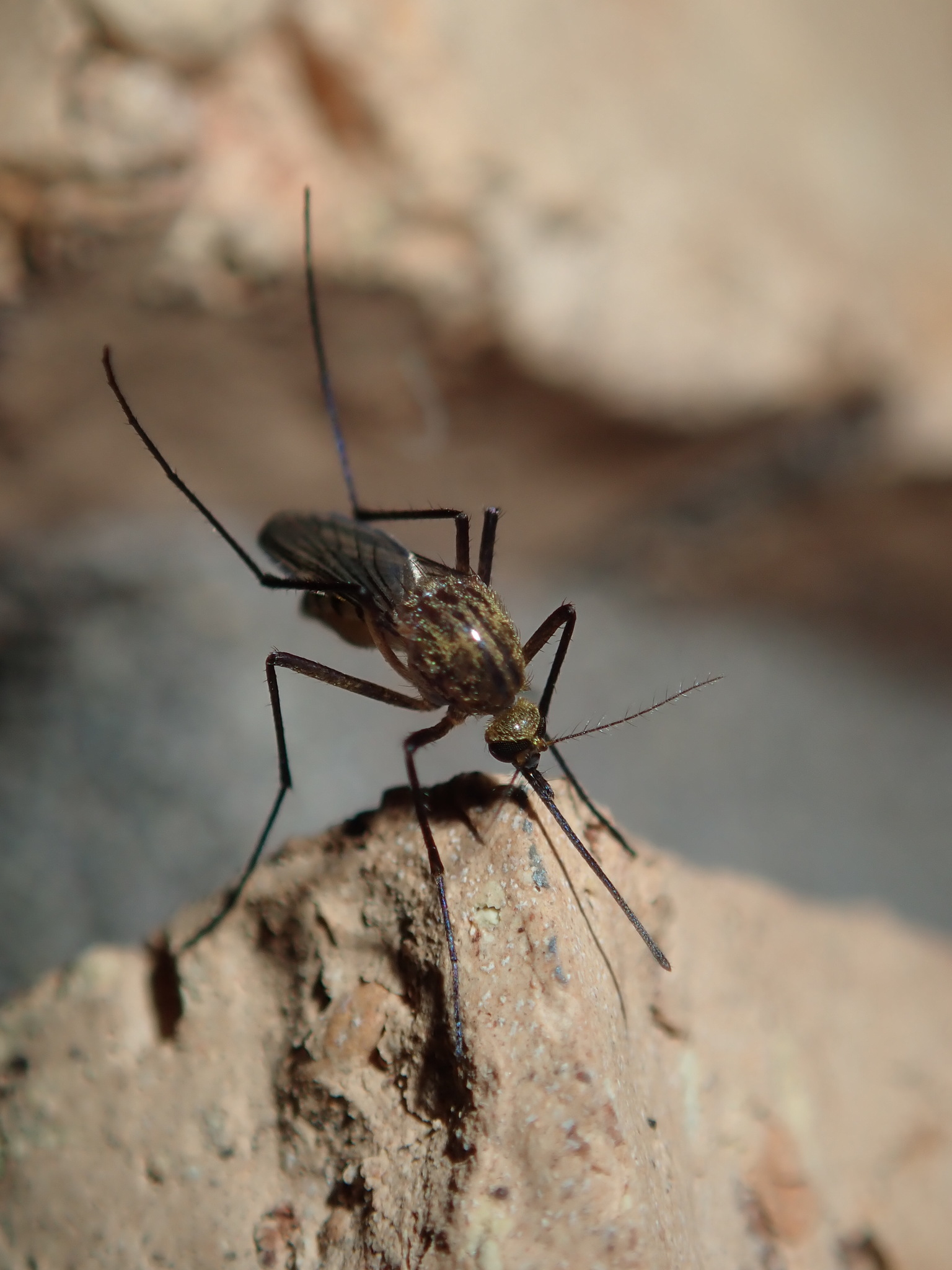
A. imperfectus

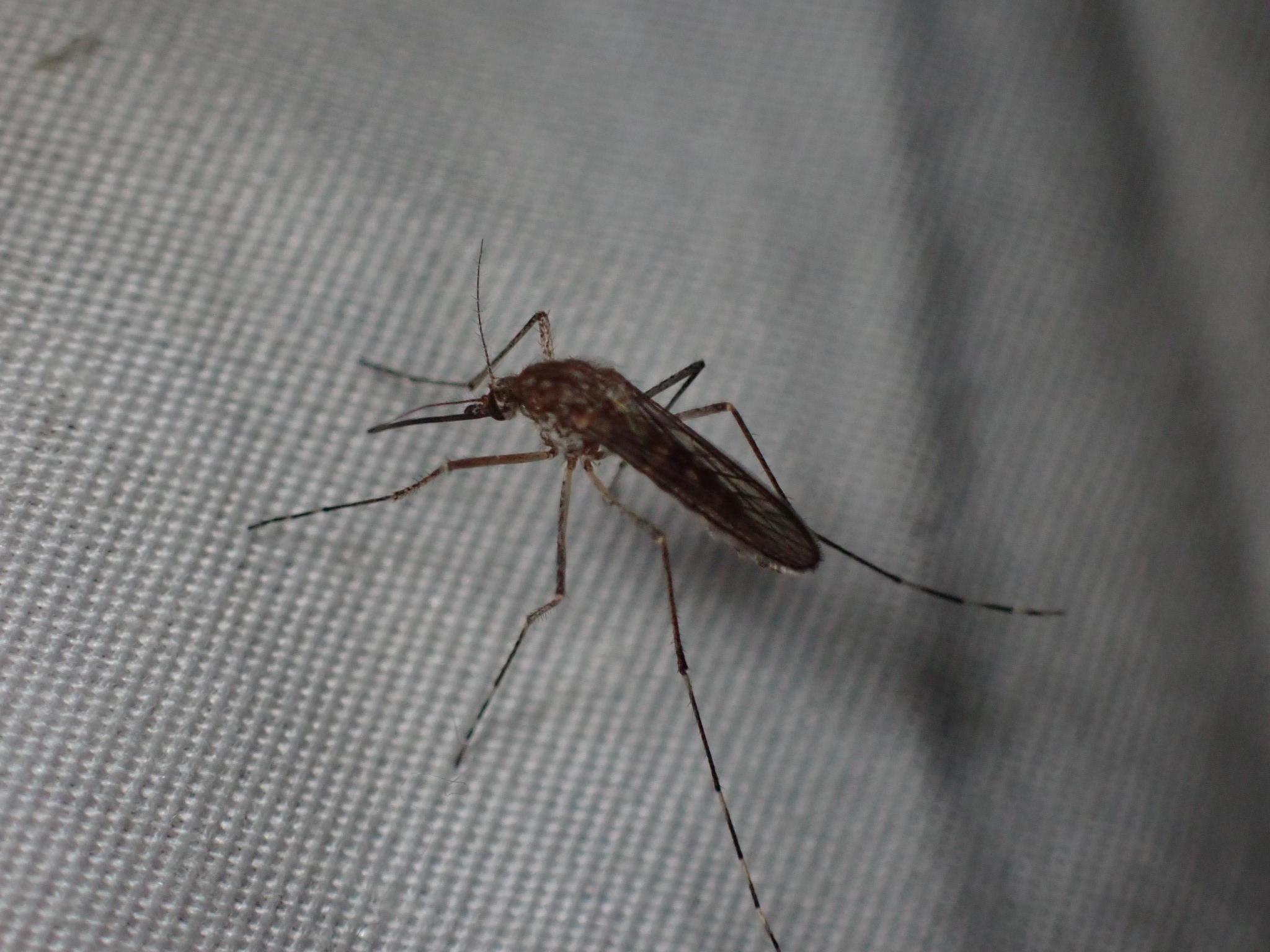
A. increpitus

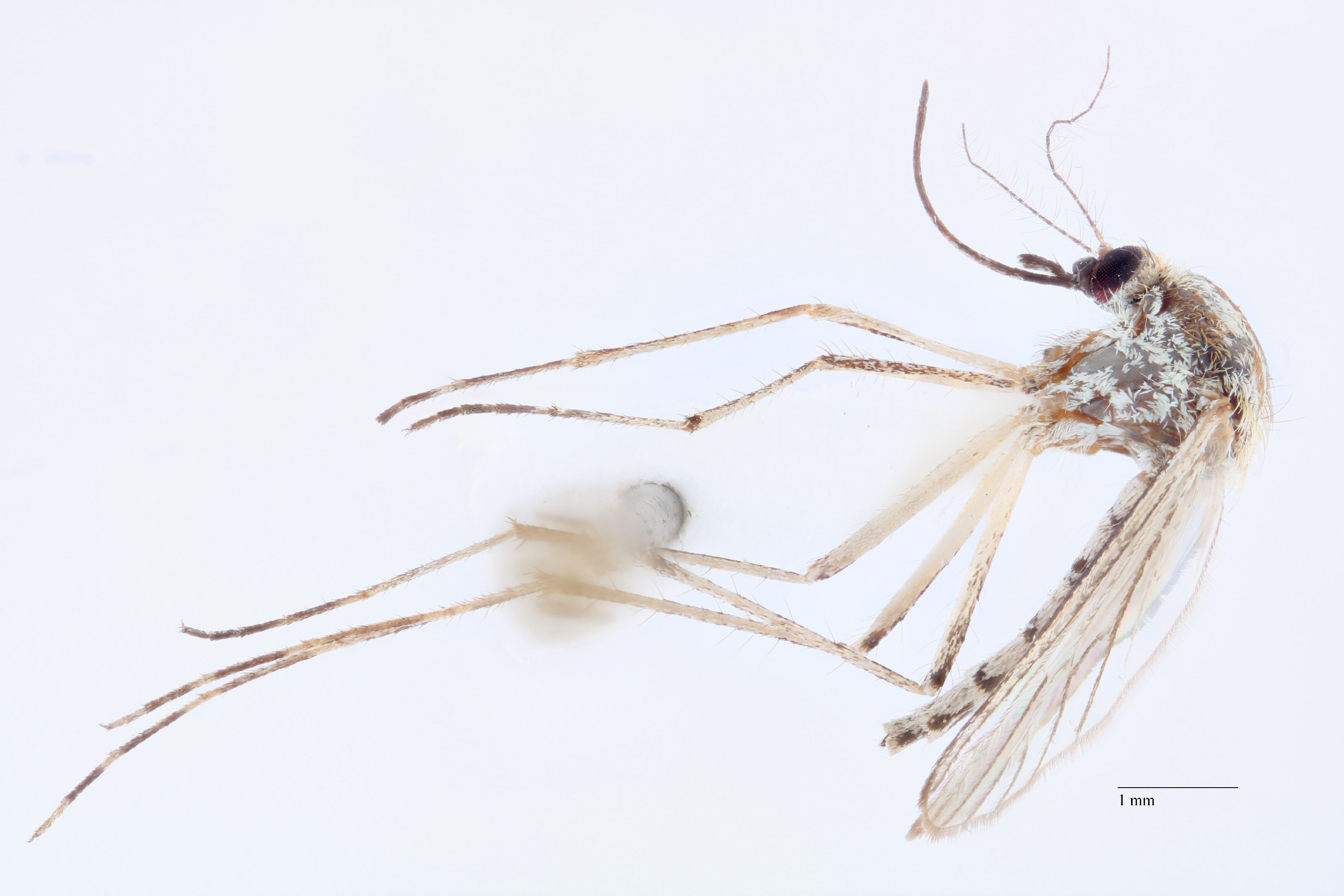
Specimens of A. melanimon

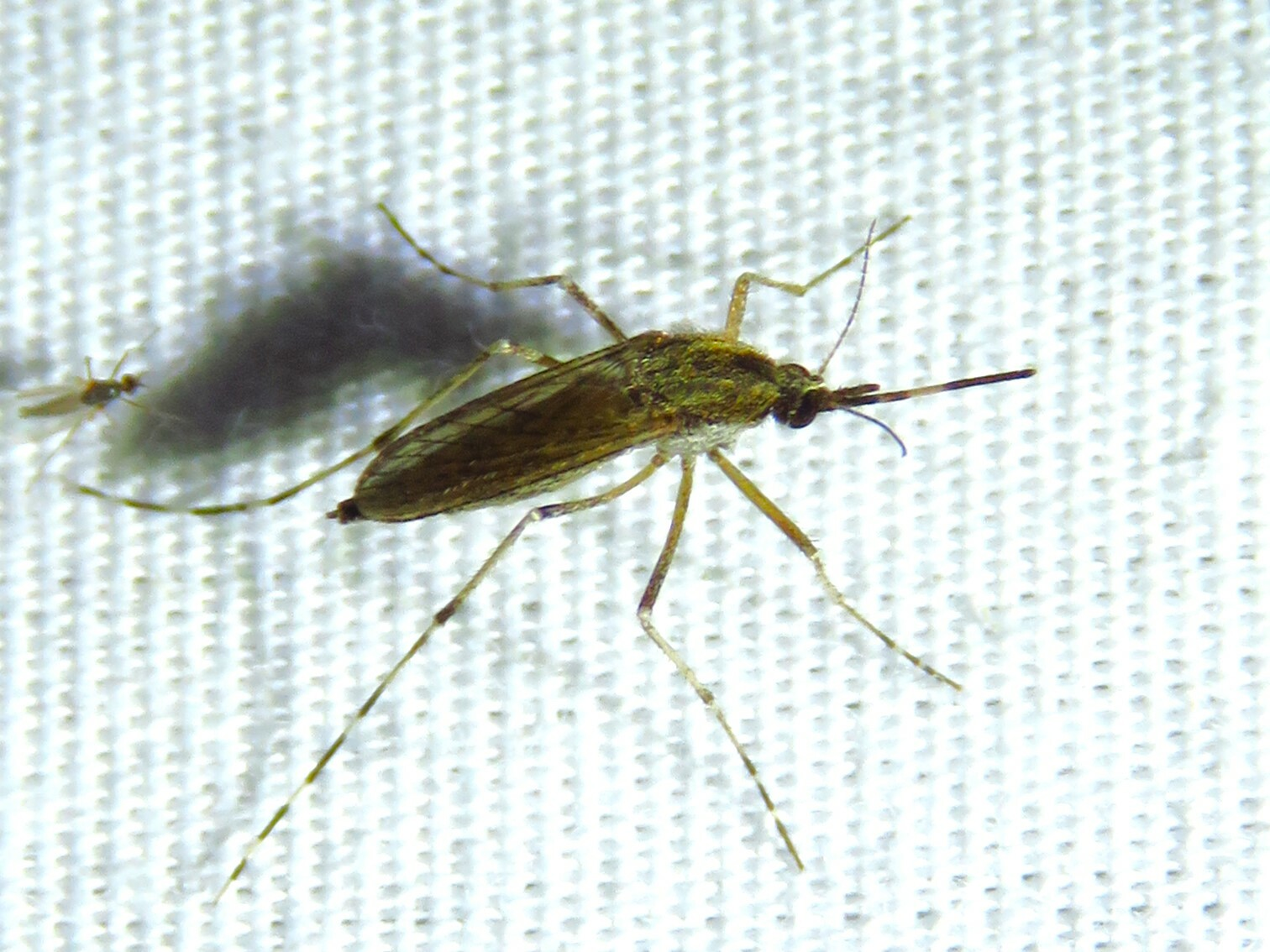
A. nigromaculis

- Aedes aboriginis Dyar, 1917-northwest coast mosquito
- Aedes abserratus (Felt and Young, 1904)
- Aedes aculeatus (Theobald, 1903)
- Aedes aenigmaticus Cerqueira and Costa, 1946
- Aedes akkeshiensis Tanaka, 1998
- Aedes albifasciatus (Macquart, 1838)
- Aedes albineus Séguy, 1923
- Aedes aloponotum Dyar, 1917
- Aedes amateuri Ortega and Zavortink in Ortega-Morales et al., 2019
- Aedes ambreensis Rodhain and Boutonnier, 1983
- Aedes andersoni Edwards, 1926
- Aedes angustivittatus Dyar and Knab, 1907
- Aedes annulipes (Meigen, 1830)

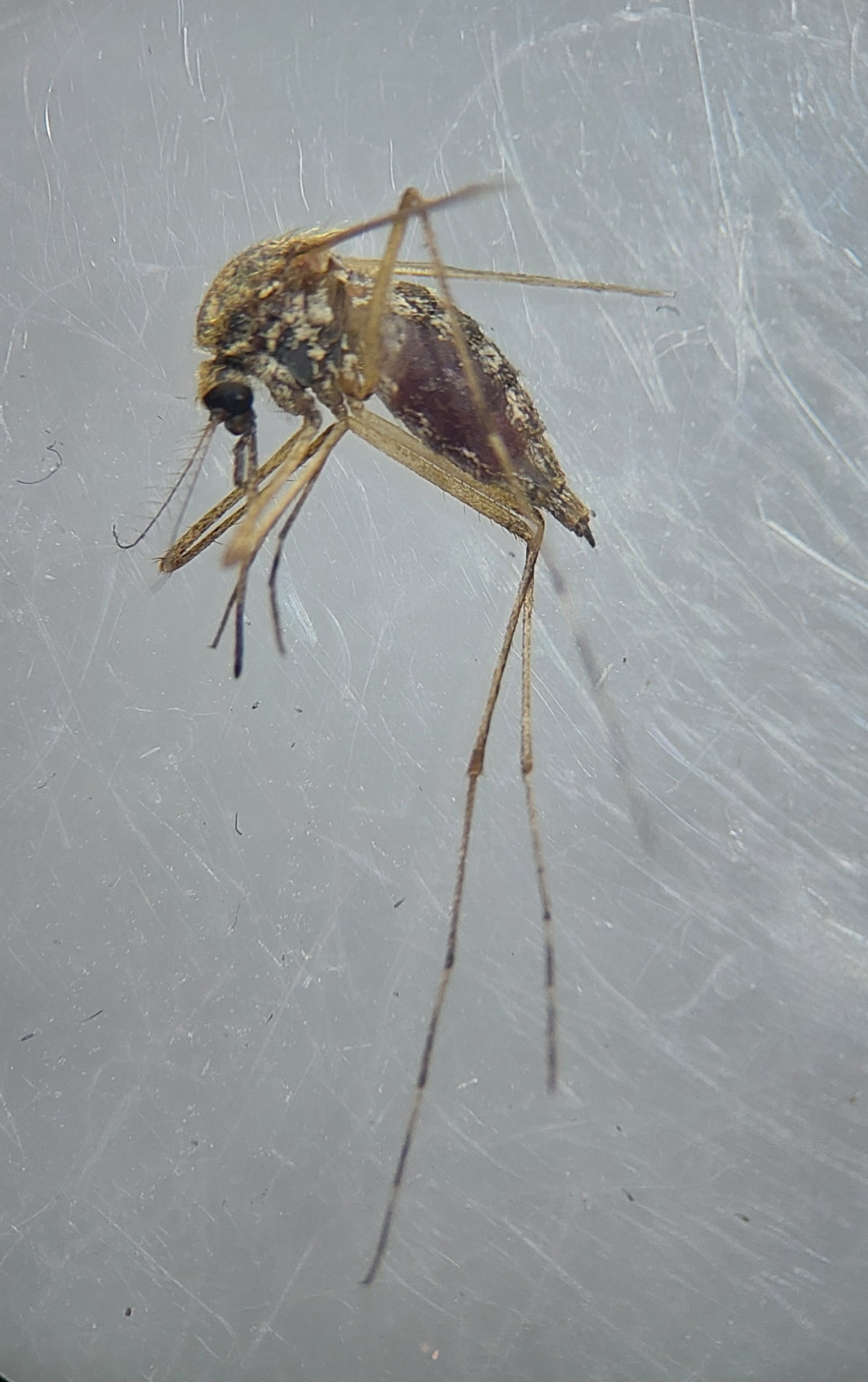
A. annulipes

- Aedes antipodeus (Edwards, 1920)
- Aedes arundinariae Kasper, 2020
- Aedes atactavittatus Arnell, 1976
- Aedes atlanticus Dyar and Knab, 1906
- Aedes auratus Grabham, 1906
- Aedes aurifer (Coquillett, 1903)
- Aedes behningi Martini, 1926
- Aedes bejaranoi Martínez, Carcavallo and Prosen, 1960
- Aedes berlandi Séguy, 1921
- Aedes bimaculatus (Coquillett, 1902)

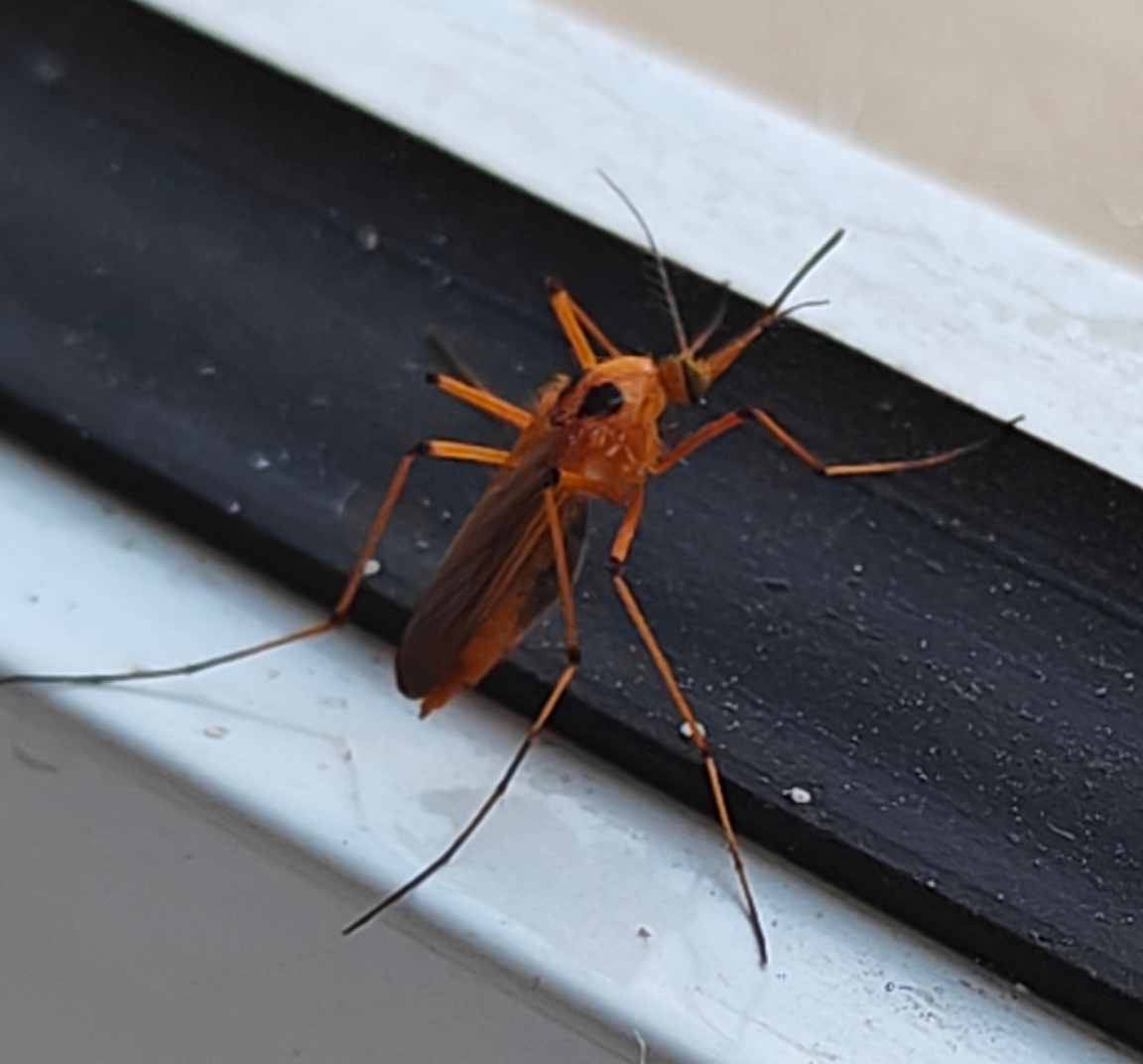
A. bimaculatus

- Aedes biskraensis Brunhes, 1999
- Aedes bogotanus Arnell, 1976
- Aedes breedensis Muspratt, 1953
- Aedes burjaticus (Kuchartshuk, 1973)
- Aedes burpengaryensis (Theobald, 1905)
- Aedes caballus (Theobald, 1912)
- Aedes cacozelus Marks, 1963
- Aedes calcariae Marks, 1957
- Aedes calumnior Belkin, Heinemann and Page, 1970
- Aedes campestris Dyar and Knab, 1907
- Aedes camptorhynchus (Thomson, 1869)
- Aedes canadensis (Theobald, 1901) - woodland pool mosquito
  - Aedes canadensis canadensis (Theobald, 1901)
  - Aedes canadensis mathesoni Middlekauff, 1944
- Aedes cantans (Meigen, 1818)
- Aedes cantator (Coquillett, 1903) - brown saltmarsh mosquito
- Aedes caspius (Pallas, 1771)
  - Aedes caspius caspius (Pallas, 1771)
  - Aedes caspius hargreavesi Edwards, 1920
  - Aedes caspius meirai Ribeiro, Ramos, Capela and Pires, 1980
- Aedes cataphylla Dyar, 1916

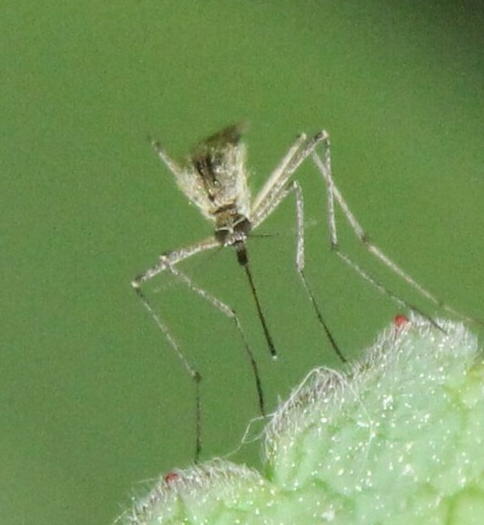
A. cataphylla

- Aedes chelli (Edwards, 1915)
- Aedes churchillensis Ellisand Burst, 1973
- Aedes clelandi (Taylor, 1914)
- Aedes clivis Lanzaro and Eldridge, 1992
- Aedes coluzzii Rioux, Guilvard and Pasteur, 1998
- Aedes comitatus Arnell, 1976
- Aedes communis (de Geer, 1776)
- Aedes condolescens Dyar and Knab, 1907
- Aedes continentalis Dobrotworsky, 1960
- Aedes crinifer (Theobald, 1903)

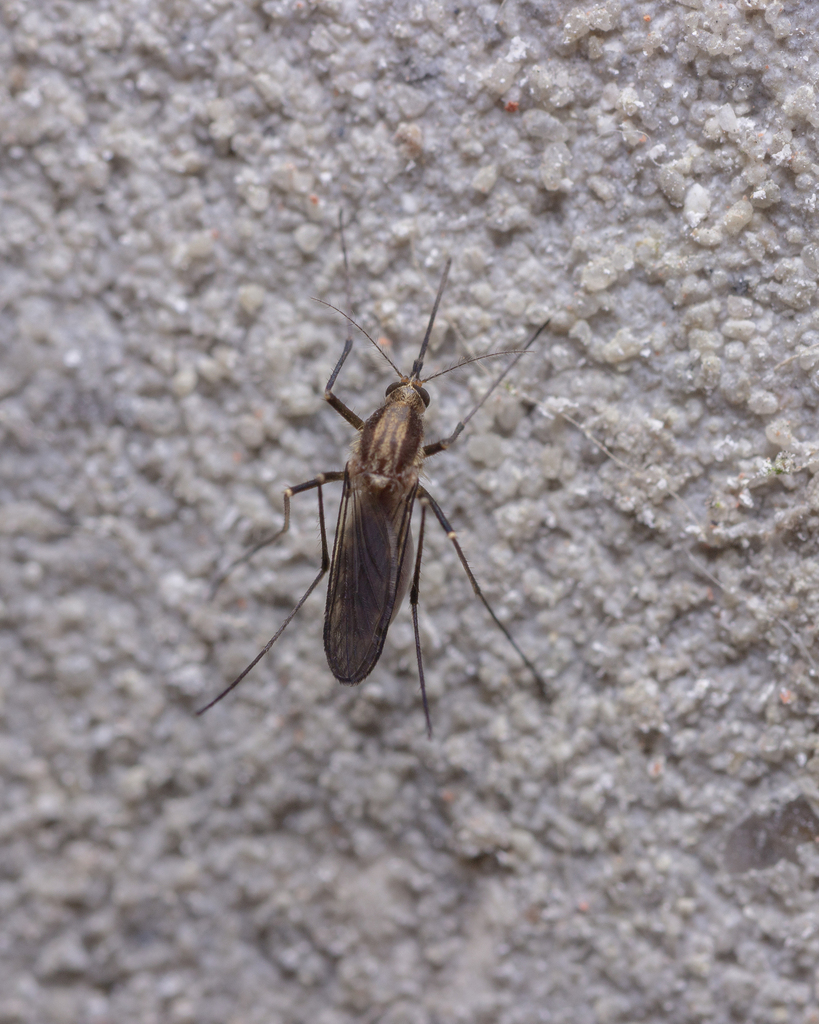
A. crinifer

- Aedes cunabulanus Edwards, 1924
- Aedes cyprioides Danilov and Stupin, 1982
- Aedes cyprius Ludlow, 1920
- Aedes dahlae (Nielsen, 2009)
- Aedes decticus Howard, Dyar and Knab, 1917
- Aedes deficiens Arnell, 1976
- Aedes detritus Haliday, 1833
- Aedes diantaeus Howard, Dyar and Knab, 1913
- Aedes dorsalis (Meigen, 1830)
- Aedes dufouri Hamon, 1953
- Aedes duplex Martini, 1926
- Aedes dupreei (Coquillett, 1904)
- Aedes dzeta Séguy, 1924
- Aedes edgari Stone and Rosen, 1952
- Aedes eidsvoldensis Mackerras, 1927
- Aedes eucephalaeus Dyar, 1918
- Aedes euedes Howard, Dyar and Knab, 1913
- Aedes euiris Dyar, 1922
- Aedes euplocamus Dyar and Knab, 1906
- Aedes excrucians (Walker, 1856)
- Aedes explorator Marks, 1964
- Aedes fitchii (Felt and Young, 1904)
- Aedes flavescens (Müller, 1764)
- Aedes flavifrons (Skuse, 1889)
- Aedes fulvus (Wiedemann, 1828)
  - Aedes fulvus fulvus Wiedemann, 1828
  - Aedes fulvus pallens Ross, 1943
- Aedes grossbecki Dyar and Knab, 1906
- Aedes gutzevichi Dubitzky and Deshevykh, 1978
- Aedes hakusanensis Yamagutiand Tamaboko, 1954
- Aedes harrisoni Muspratt, 1953
- Aedes hastatus Dyar, 1922
- Aedes hesperonotius Marks, 1959
- Aedes hexodontus Dyar, 1916
- Aedes hodgkini Marks, 1959
- Aedes hokkaidensis Tanaka, Mizusawa and Saugstad, 1979
- Aedes hungaricus Mihályi, 1955
- Aedes imperfectus Dobrotworsky, 1962
- Aedes impiger (Walker, 1848)
  - Aedes impiger daisetsuzanus Tanaka, Mizusawa and Saugstad, 1979
  - Aedes impiger impiger Walker, 1848
- Aedes implicatus Vockeroth, 1954
- Aedes incomptus Arnell, 1976
- Aedes increpitus Dyar, 1916
- Aedes inexpectatus BonneWepster, 1948
- Aedes infirmatus Dyar and Knab, 1906
- Aedes intermedius Danilov and Gornostaeva, 1987
- Aedes intrudens Dyar, 1919
- Aedes jacobinae Serafim and Davis, 1933
- Aedes jorgi Carpintero and Leguizamón, 2000
- Aedes juppi McIntosh, 1973
- Aedes kasachstanicus Gutsevich, 1962
- Aedes lasaensis Meng, 1962
  - Aedes lasaensis gyirongensis** Ma, 1982
  - Aedes lasaensis lasaensis Meng, 1962
- Aedes lepidus Cerqueira and Paraense, 1945
- Aedes leucomelas (Meigen, 1804)
- Aedes linesi Marks, 1964
- Aedes longifilamentus Su and Zhang, 1988
- Aedes luteifemur Edwards, 1926
- Aedes macintoshi Marks, 1959
- Aedes martineti Sevenet, 1937
- Aedes mcdonaldi Belkin, 1962
- Aedes melanimon Dyar, 1924
- Aedes meprai Martínez and Prosen, 1953
- Aedes mercurator Dyar, 1920
- Aedes milleri Dyar, 1922
- Aedes mitchellae (Dyar, 1905)
- Aedes montchadskyi Dubitzky, 1968
- Aedes nevadensis Chapman and Barr, 1964
- Aedes nigrinus (Eckstein, 1918)
- Aedes nigripes (Zetterstedt, 1838)
- Aedes nigrithorax (Macquart, 1847)
- Aedes nigrocanus Martini, 1927
- Aedes nigromaculis (Ludlow, 1906)
- Aedes niphadopsis Dyar and Knab, 1918
- Aedes nivalis Edwards, 1926
- Aedes normanensis (Taylor, 1915)
- Aedes nubilus (Theobald, 1903)
- Aedes obturbator Dyar and Knab, 1907
- Aedes oligopistus Dyar, 1918
- Aedes patersoni Shannon and Del Ponte, 1928
- Aedes pectinatus Arnell, 1976
- Aedes pennai Antunes and Lane, 1938
- Aedes perkinsi Marks, 1949
- Aedes pertinax Grabham, 1906
- Aedes phaecasiatus Marks, 1964
- Aedes phaeonotus Arnell, 1976
- Aedes pionips Dyar, 1919

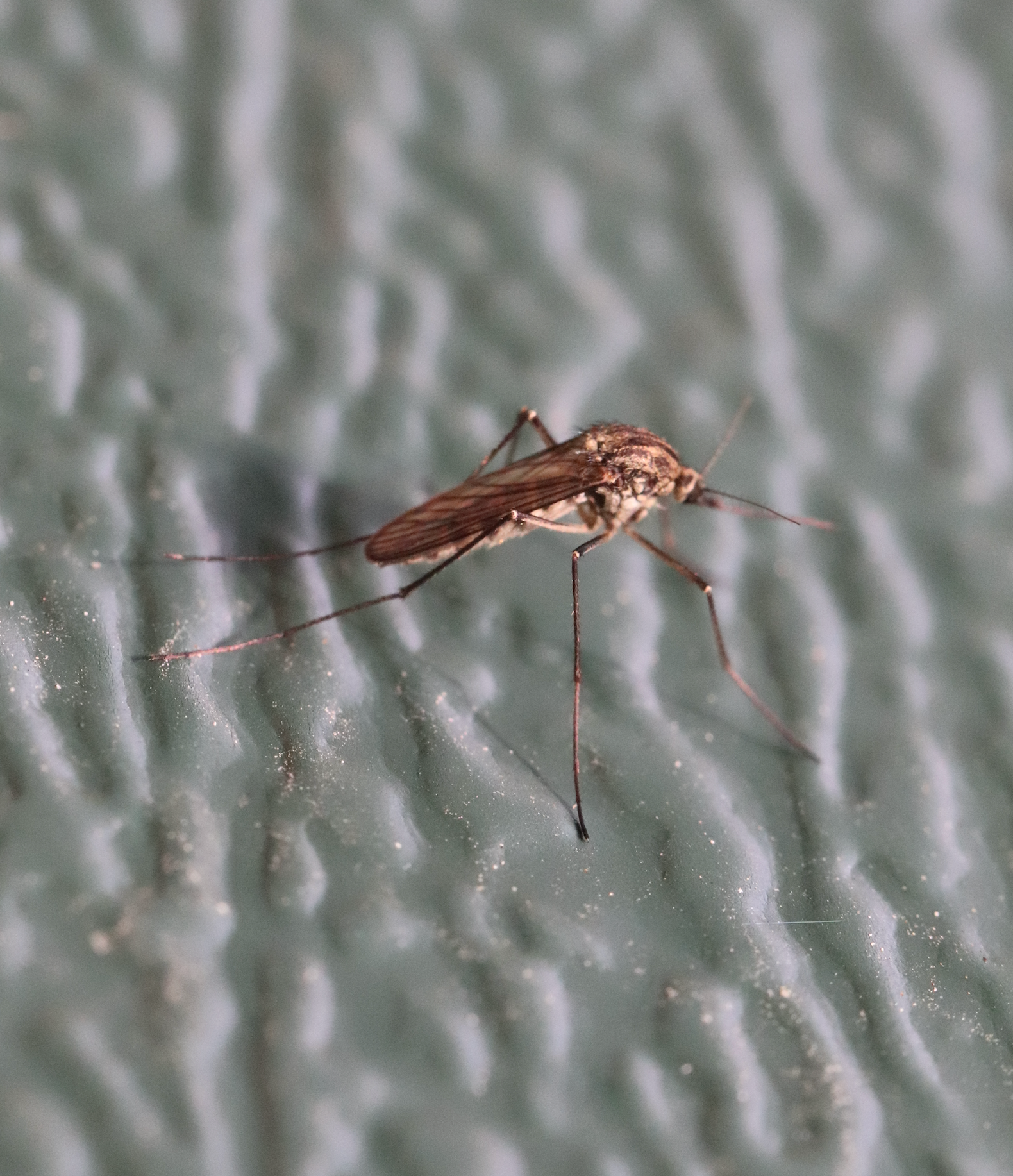
A. pionips

- Aedes procax (Skuse, 1889)

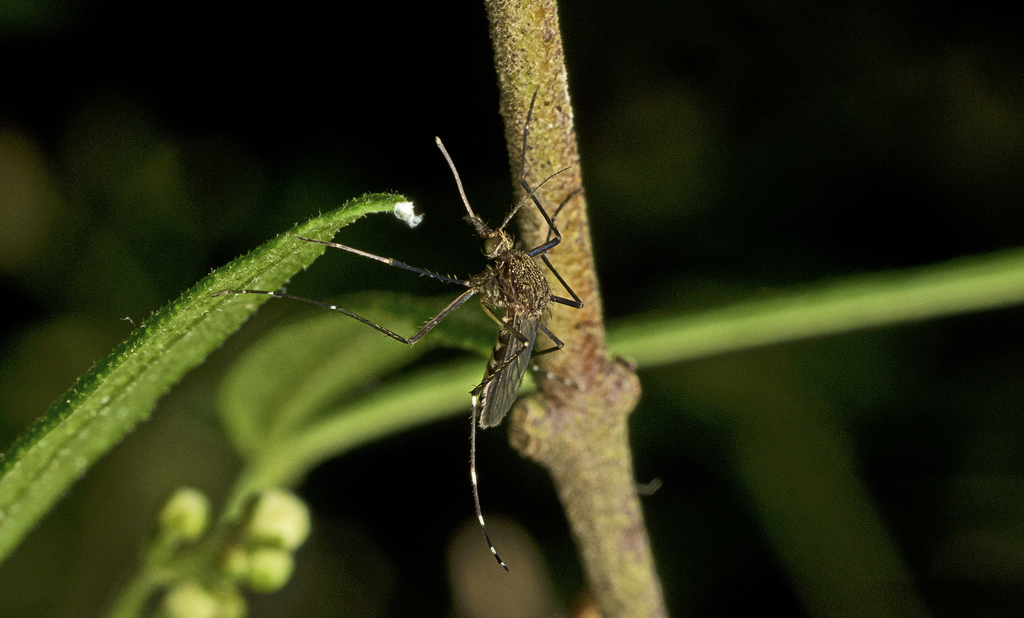
A. procax

- Aedes pseudonormanensis Marks, 1949
- Aedes pulcritarsis (Rondani, 1872)

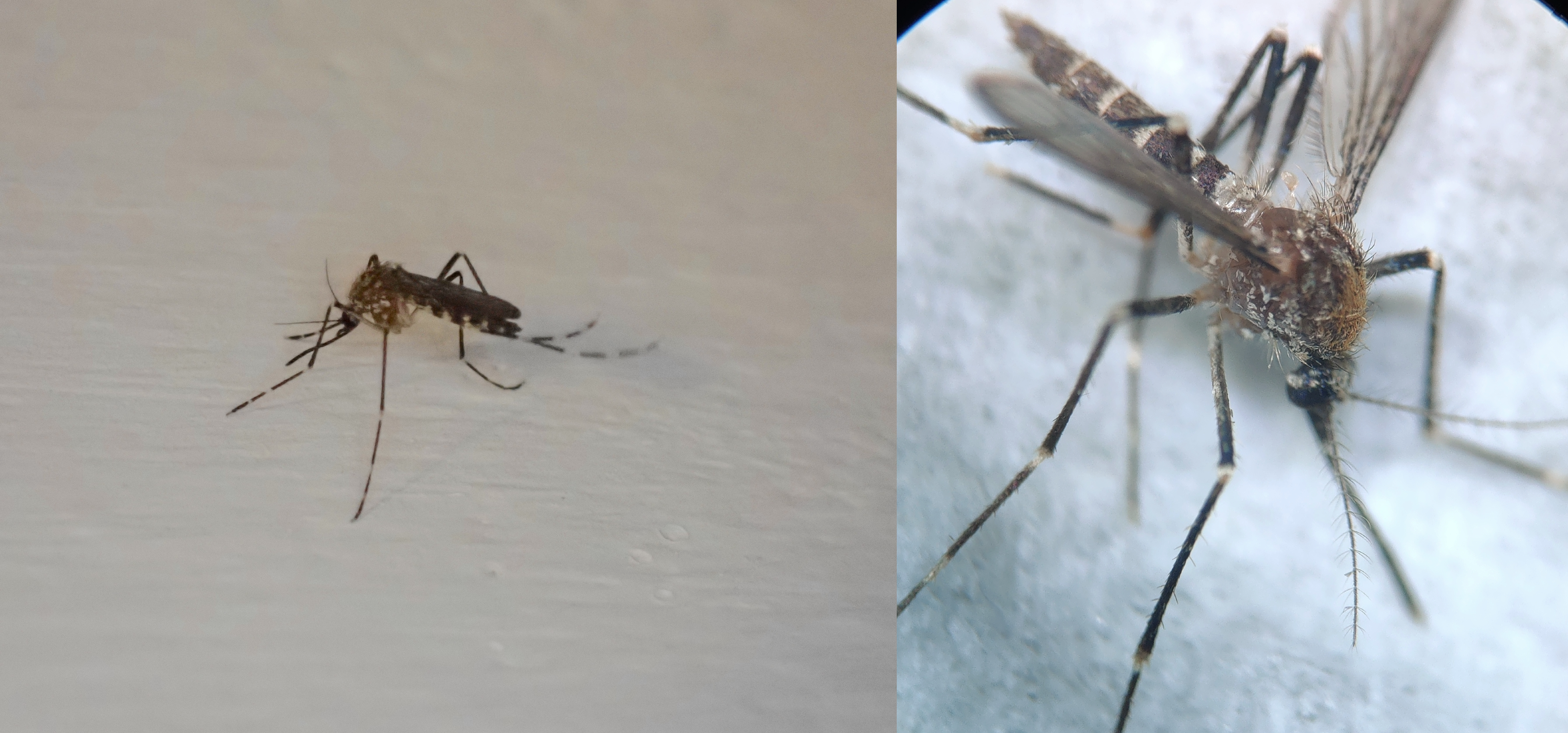
A. pulcritarsis

  - Aedes pulcritarsis asiaticus Edwards, 1926
  - Aedes pulcritarsis pulcritarsis Rondani, 1872
- Aedes pullatus (Coquillett, 1904)
- Aedes punctodes Dyar, 1922
- Aedes punctor (Kirby, 1837)

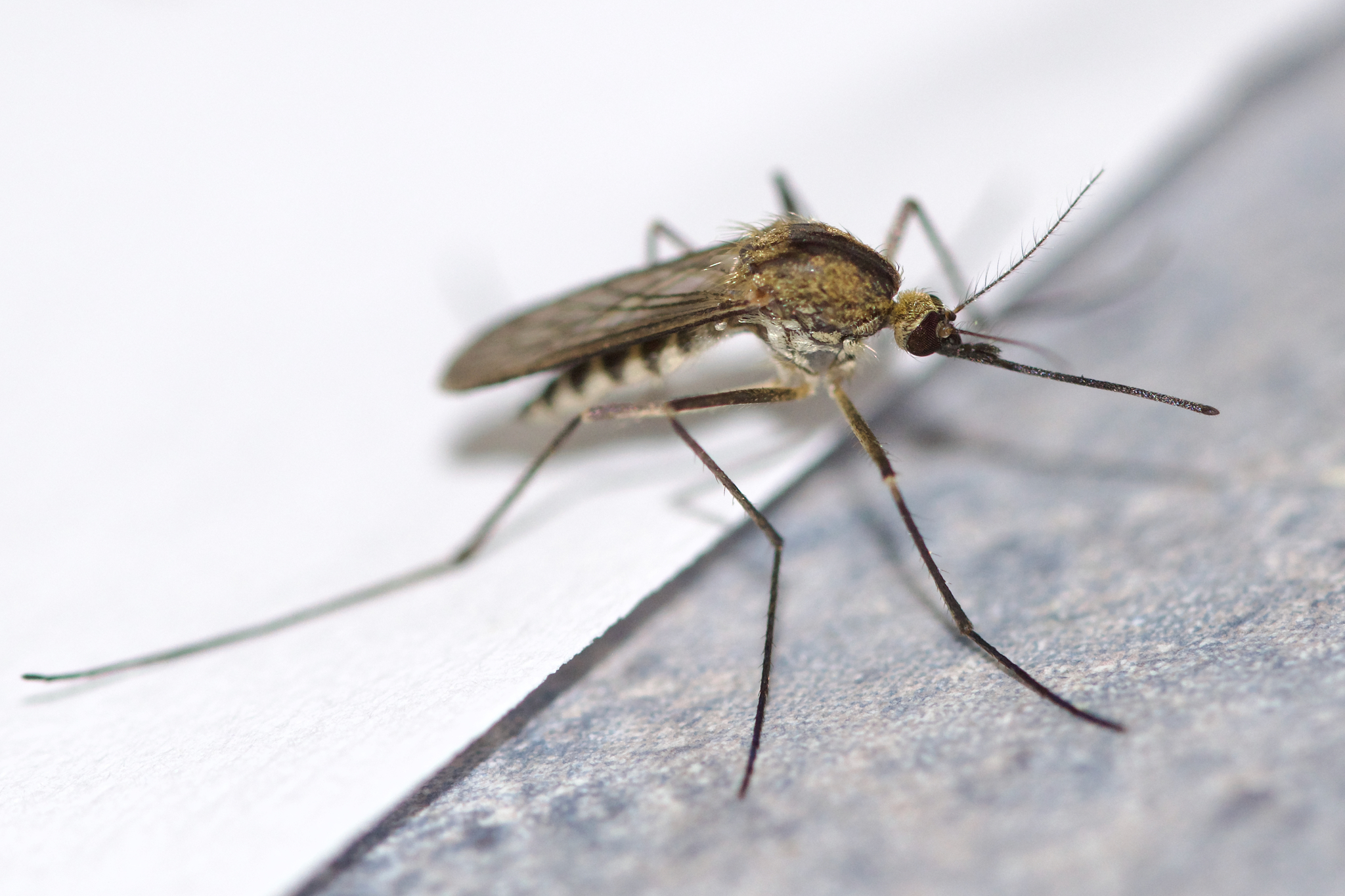
A. punctor

- Aedes purpuraceus Brug, 1932
- Aedes purpureifemur Marks, 1959
- Aedes purpuriventris Edwards, 1926
- Aedes ratcliffei Marks, 1959
- Aedes raymondi Del Ponte, Castro and García, 1951
- Aedes rempeli Vockeroth, 1954
- Aedes rhyacophilus da Costa Lima, 1933
- Aedes riparioides Su and Zhang, 1987
- Aedes riparius Dyar and Knab, 1907

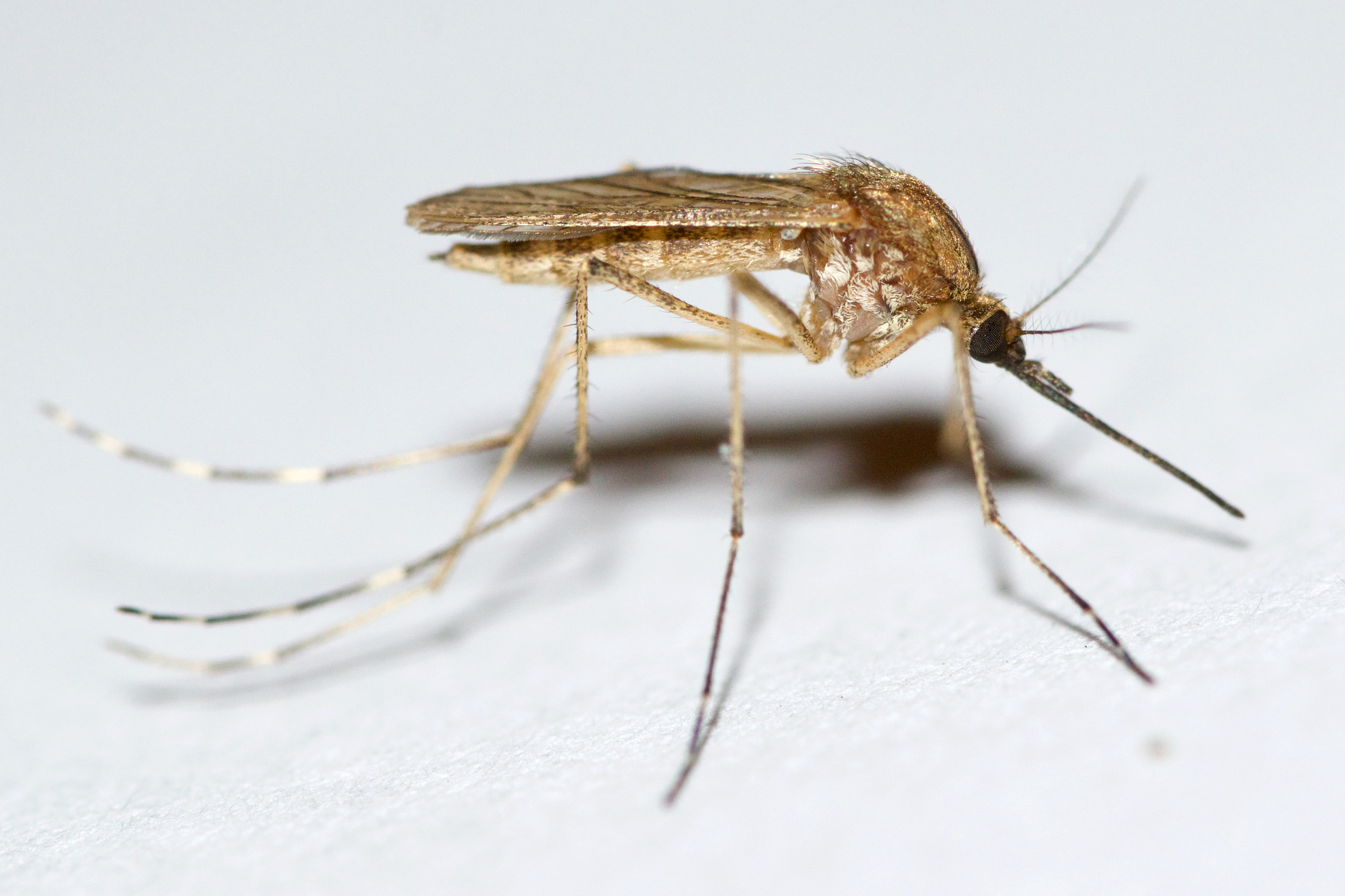
A. riparius

- Aedes sagax (Skuse, 1889)

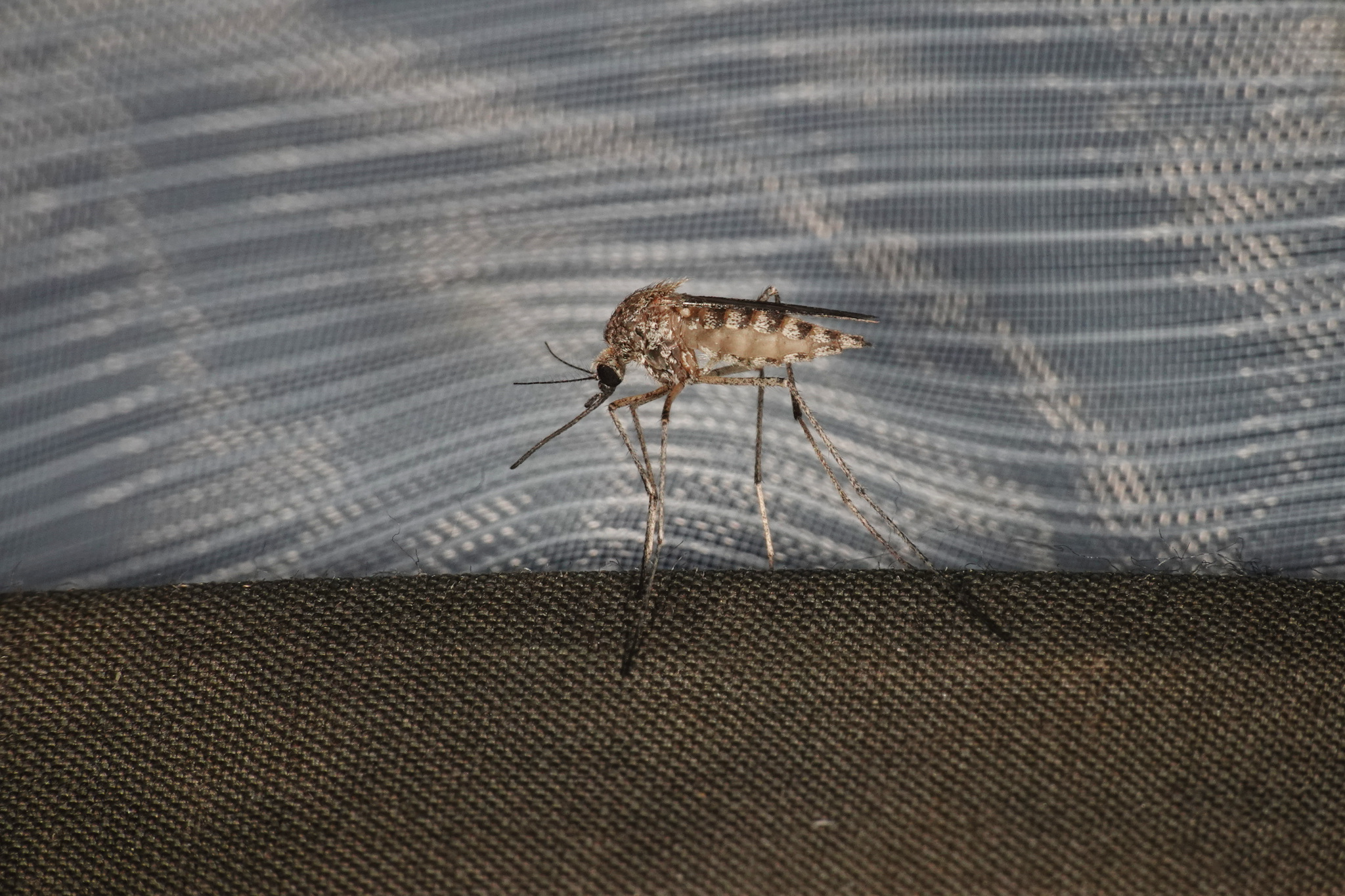
A. sagax

- Aedes sallumae González and Reyes in González et al., 2017
- Aedes sapiens Marks, 1964
- Aedes scapularis (Rondani, 1848)
- Aedes schizopinax Dyar, 1929
- Aedes schtakelbergi Shingarev, 1928
- Aedes scutellatum Boshell-Manrique, 1939
- Aedes sedaensis Lei, 1989
- Aedes sergievi Danilov, Markovich and Proskuryakova, 1978
- Aedes serratus (Theobald, 1901)
- Aedes shannoni Vargas and Downs, 1950
- Aedes silvestris (Dobrotworsky, 1961)
- Aedes simanini Gutsevich, 1966
- Aedes sinkiangensis Hsiao, 1977
- Aedes sollicitans (Walker, 1856) saltmarsh mosquito
- Aedes spencerii (Theobald, 1901)
  - Aedes spencerii idahoensis Theobald, 1903
  - Aedes spencerii spencerii Theobald, 1901
- Aedes spilotus Marks, 1963
- Aedes squamiger (Coquillett, 1902) - California saltmarsh mosquito

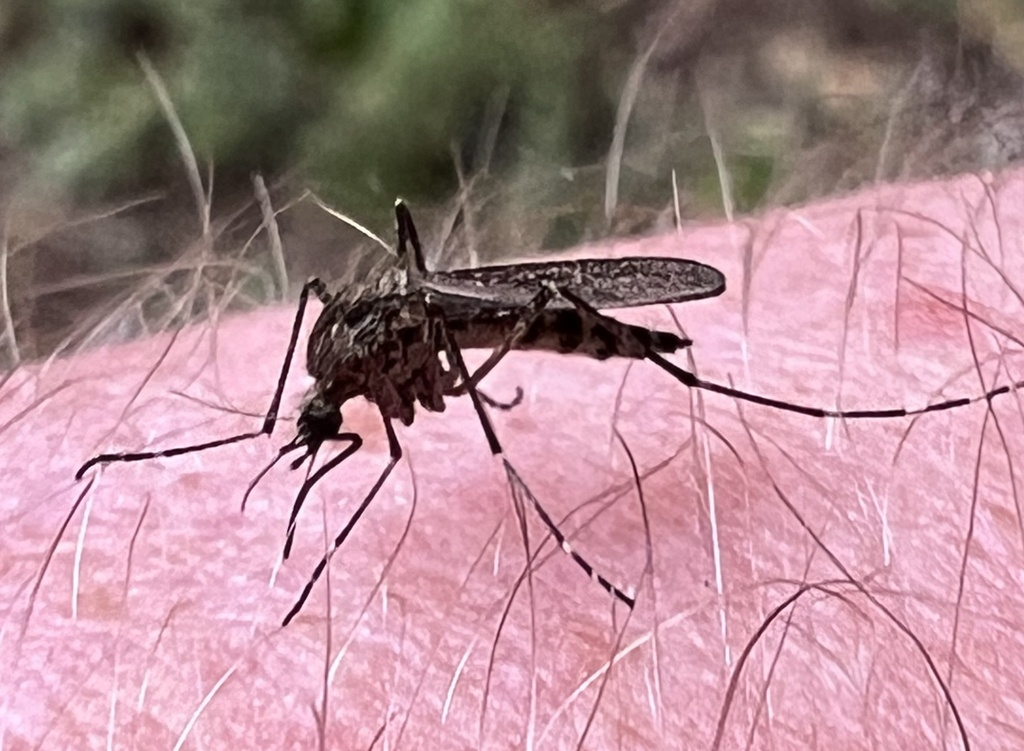
A. squamiger

- Aedes sticticus (Meigen, 1838) - floodwater mosquito
- Aedes stigmaticus Edwards, 1922

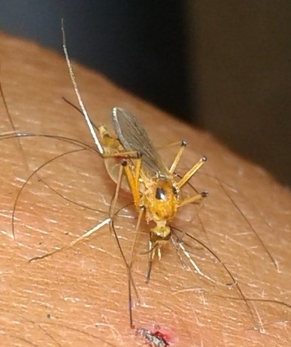
A. stigmaticus

- Aedes stimulans (Walker, 1848) - woodland mosquito

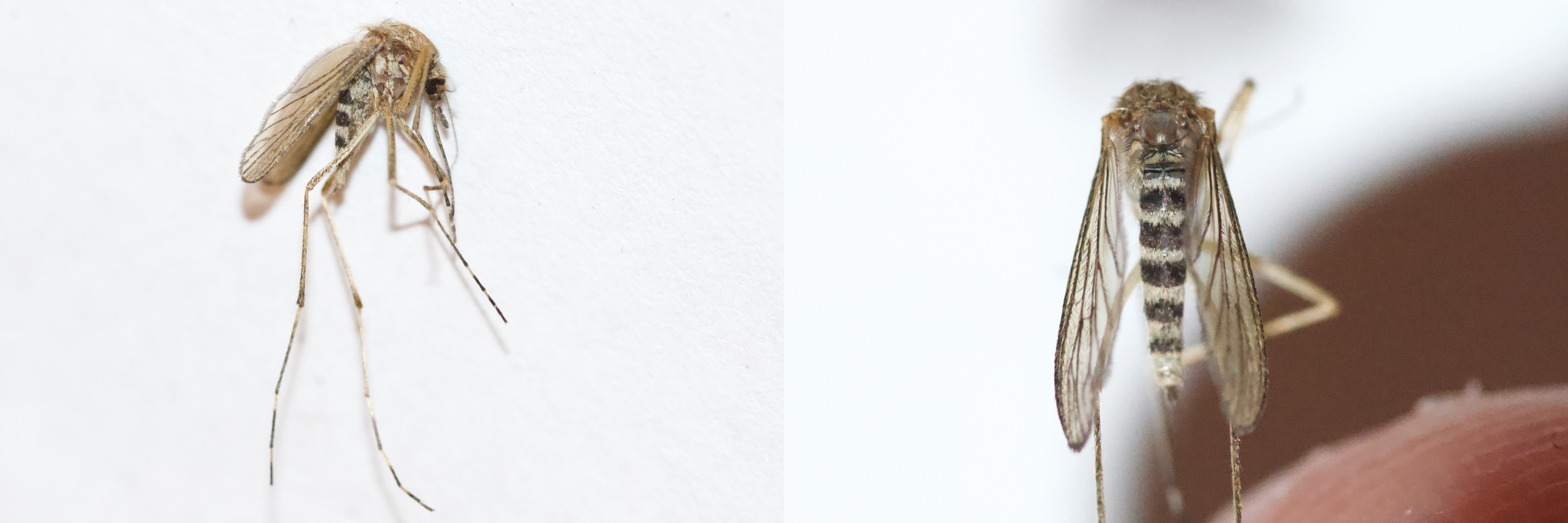
A. stimulans

- Aedes stramineus Dubitzky, 1970
- Aedes stricklandi (Edwards, 1912)
- Aedes subalbirostris Klein and Marks, 1960

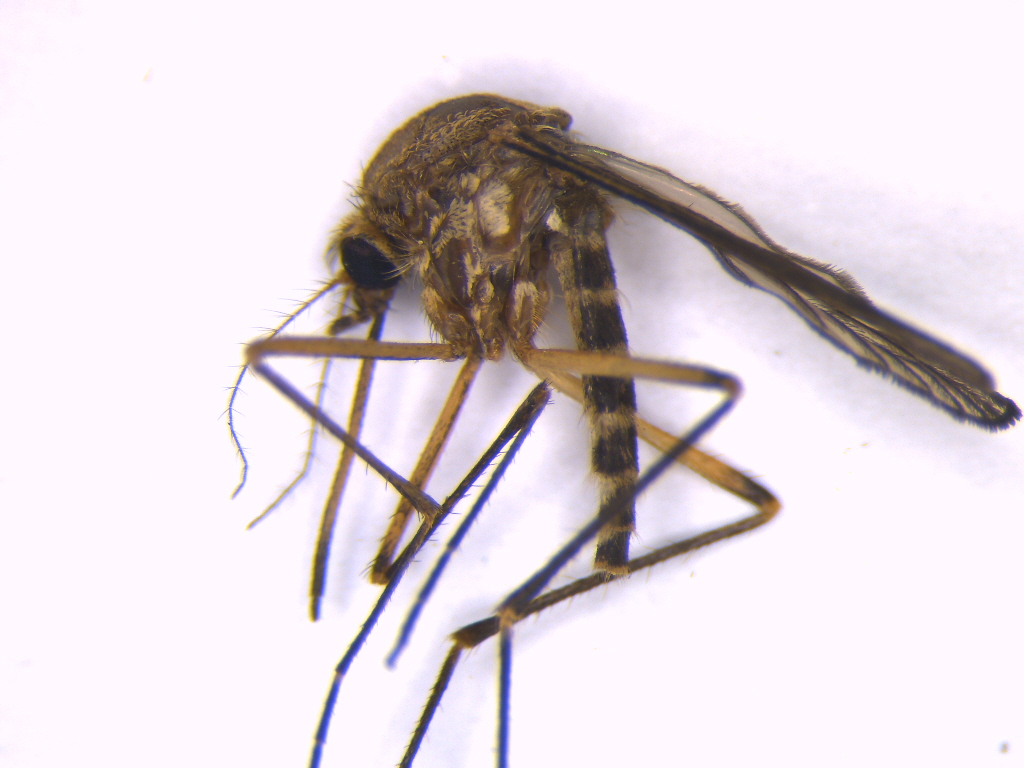
A. subalbirostris

- Aedes surcoufi (Theobald, 1912)
- Aedes synchytus Arnell, 1976
- Aedes taeniorhynchus (Wiedemann, 1821) - black salt marsh mosquito
- Aedes tahoensis Dyar, 1916
- Aedes thelcter Dyar, 1918
- Aedes theobaldi (Taylor, 1914)
- Aedes thibaulti Dyar and Knab, 1910
- Aedes tormentor Dyar and Knab, 1906

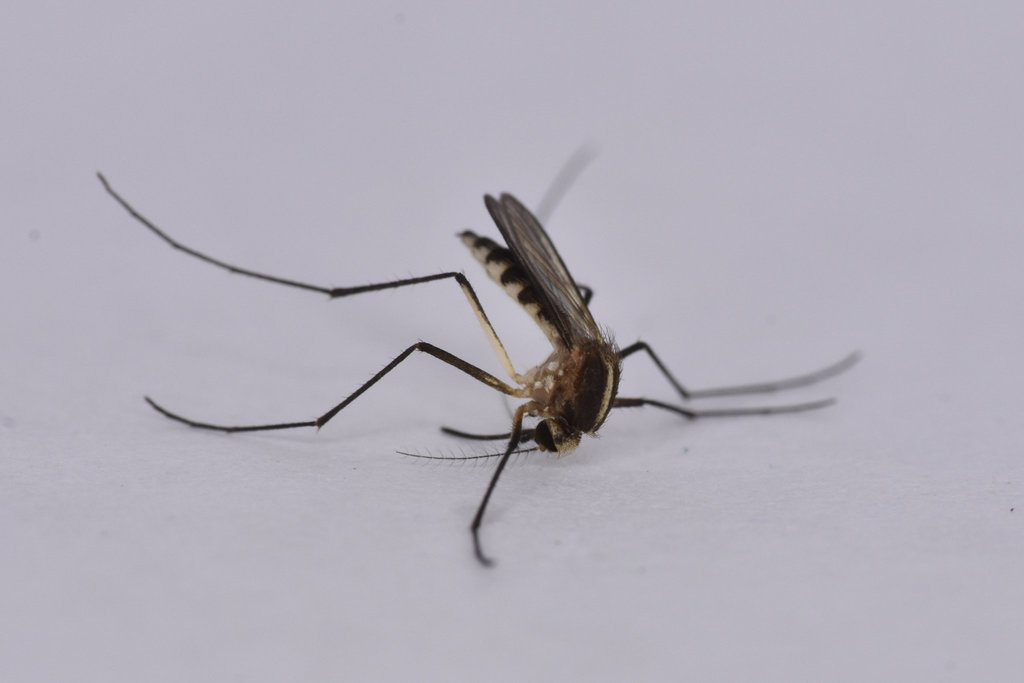
A. tormentor

- Aedes tortilis (Theobald, 1903)
- Aedes trivittatus (Coquillett, 1902)

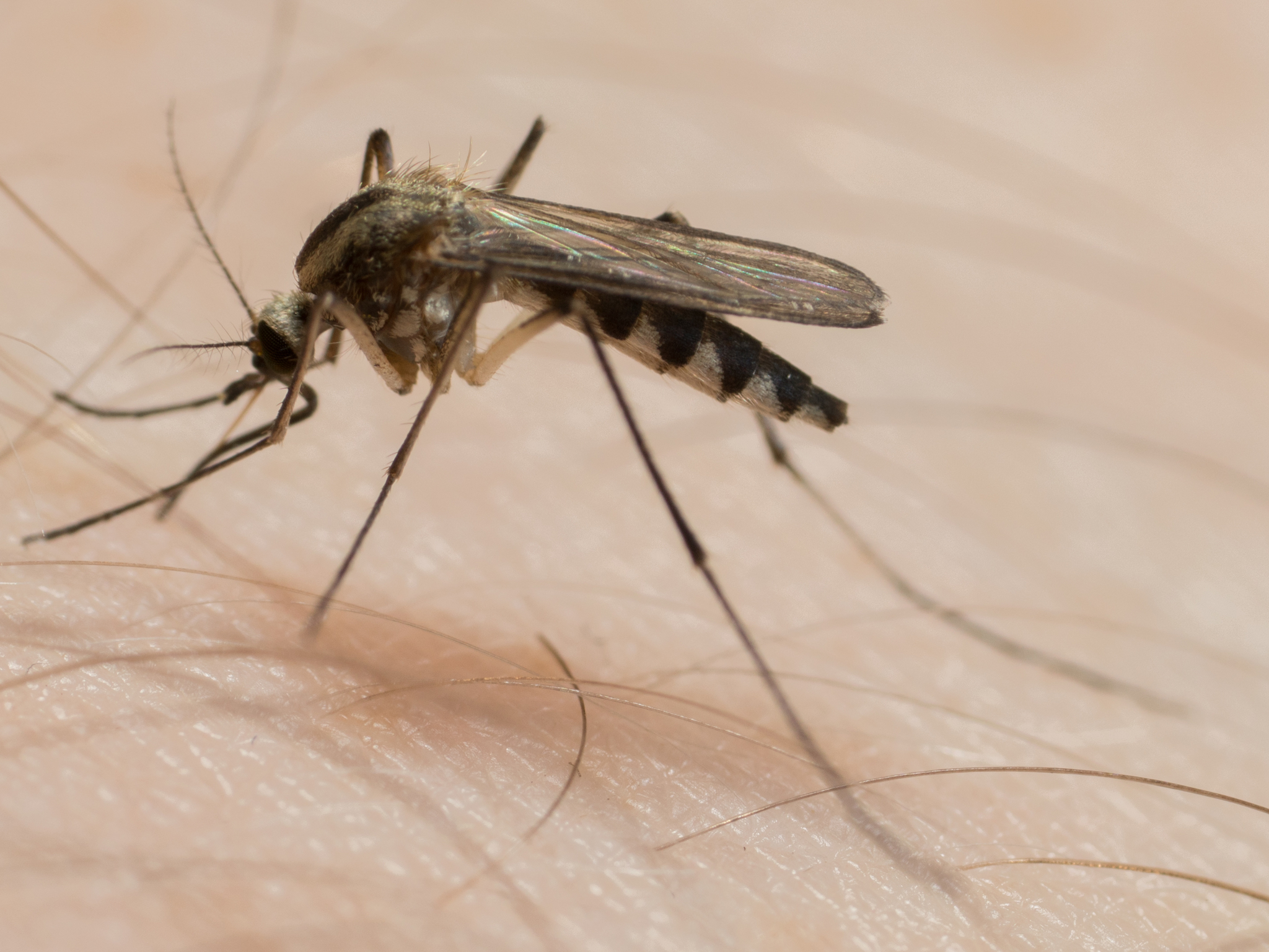
A. trivittatus

- Aedes turneri Marks, 1963
- Aedes upatensis Anduze and Hecht, 1943
- Aedes ventrovittis Dyar, 1916
- Aedes vigilax (Skuse, 1889)
  - Aedes vigilax ludlowae Blanchard, 1905
  - Aedes vigilax vansomerenae Mattingly in Mattingly and Brown, 1955
  - Aedes vigilax vigilax (Skuse, 1889)

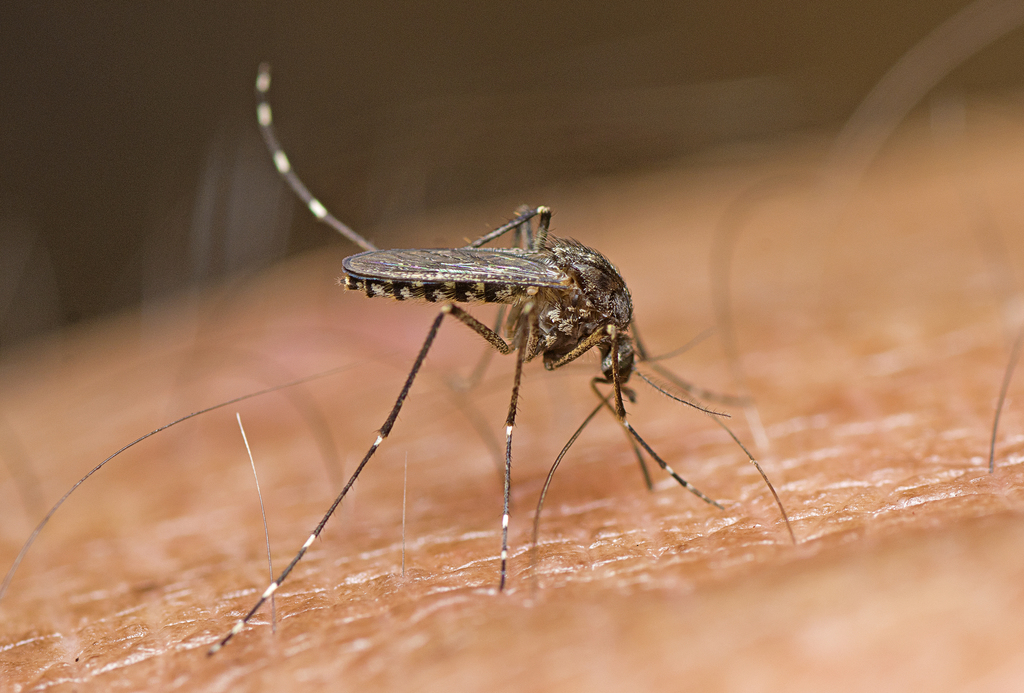
A. vigilax

- Aedes vittiger (Skuse, 1889)

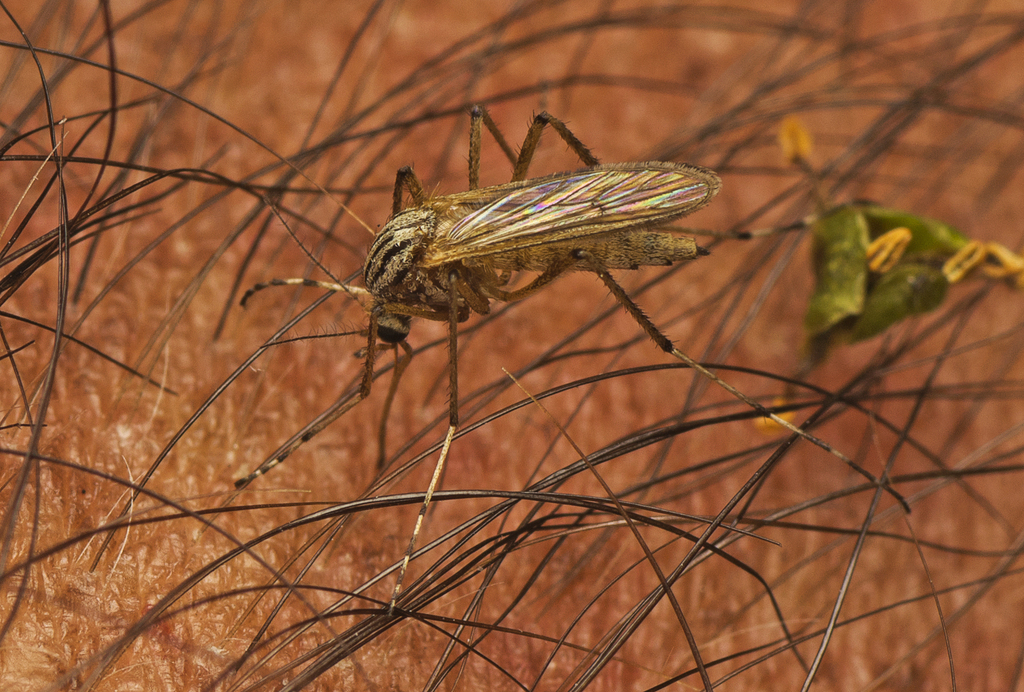
A. vittiger

- Aedes washinoi Lanzaro and Eldridge, 1992

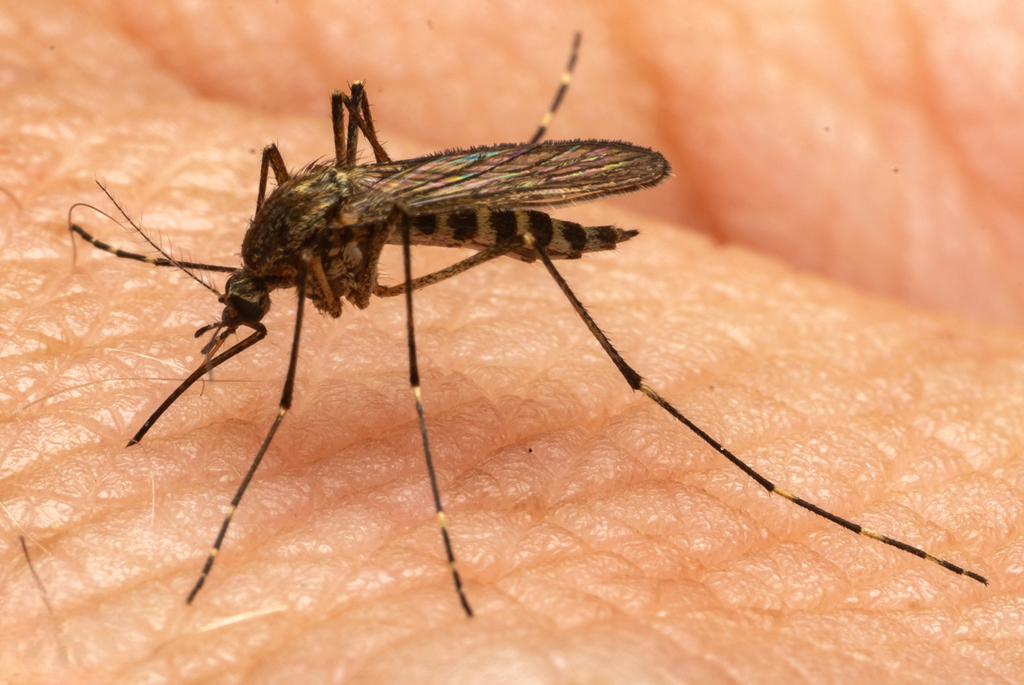
A. washinoi

- Aedes protolepis (Cockerell, 1916) - extinct
- Aedes serafini (Szadziewski, 1998) - extinct

=== Subgenus (Paraedes) Edwards, 1934 ===
- Aedes barraudi (Edwards, 1934)
- Aedes bonneae Mattingly, 1958
- Aedes chrysoscuta (Theobald, 1910)
- Aedes collessi Mattingly, 1958
- Aedes ostentatio (Leicester, 1908)
- Aedes pagei (Ludlow, 1911)
- Aedes jambulingami (Natarajan, 2019)
- Aedes menoni Mattingly, 1958
- Aedes thailandensis Reinert, 1976

=== Subgenus (Patmarksia) Reinert, Harbach and Kitching, 2006 ===
- Aedes anggiensis Bonne-Wepster, 1937
- Aedes argenteitarsis Brug, 1932
- Aedes argyronotum Belkin, 1962
- Aedes buxtoni Belkin, 1962
- Aedes clintoni Taylor, 1946
- Aedes derooki Brug, 1932
- Aedes dobodurus King and Hoogstraal, 1946
- Aedes hollandius King and Hoogstraal, 1946
- Aedes mackerrasi Taylor, 1927
- Aedes novalbitarsis King and Hoogstraal, 1946
- Aedes palmarum Edwards, 1924

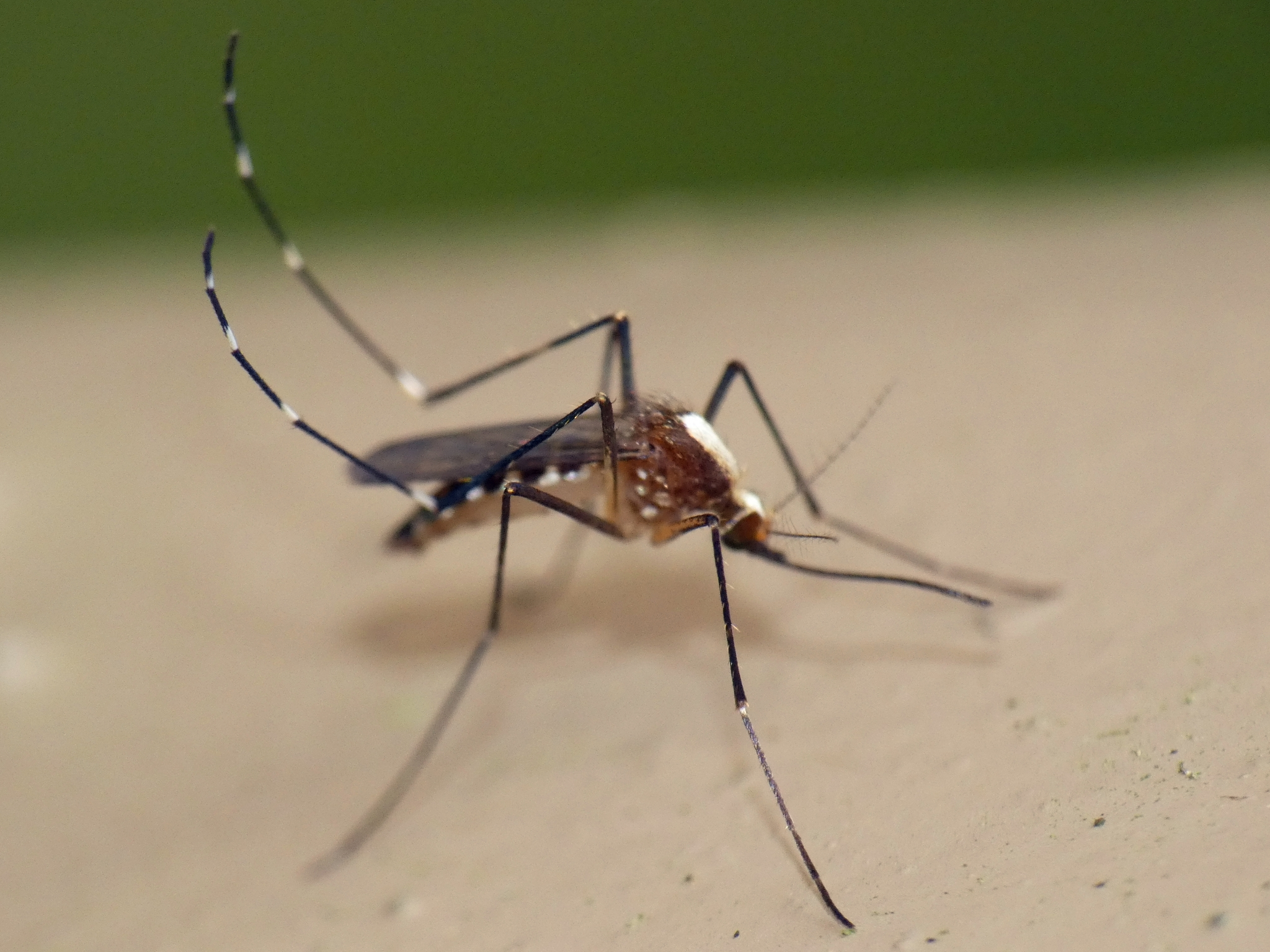
A. palmarum

- Aedes papuensis (Taylor, 1914)
- Aedes subalbitarsis King and Hoogstraal, 1946

=== Subgenus (Paulianius) Brunhes and Boussés, 2017 ===
- Aedes ambremontis (Brunhes and Boussés, 2017)
- Aedes brucei Wilkerson in Wilkerson, Linton and Strickman, 2021
- Aedes coulangesi (Rodhain and Boutonnier, 1983)
- Aedes grassei (Doucet, 1951)
- Aedes madagascarensis (van Someren, 1949)
- Aedes rhodaini (Brunhes and Boussés, 2017)
- Aedes tiptoni (Grjebine, 1953)
- Aedes zethus (De Meillon and Lavoipierre, 1944)

=== Subgenus (Petermattinglyius) Reinert, Harbach and Kitching, 2009 ===
- Aedes franciscoi (Mattingly, 1959)
- Aedes iyengari (Edwards, 1923)
- Aedes punctipes (Edwards, 1921)
- Aedes scanloni (Reinert, 1970)
- Aedes whartoni (Mattingly, 1965)

=== Subgenus (Phagomyia) Theobald, 1905 ===
- Aedes assamensis (Theobald, 1908)
- Aedes cacharanus (Barraud, 1923)
- Aedes cogilli (Edwards, 1922)
- Aedes deccanus (Barraud, 1923)
- Aedes feegradei (Barraud, 1934)
- Aedes gubernatoris (Giles, 1901)
  - Aedes gubernatoris gubernatoris Giles, 1901-valid
  - Aedes gubernatoris kotiensis Barraud, 1934
- Aedes inquinatus (Edwards, 1922)
- Aedes iwi (Marks, 1955)
- Aedes khazani (Edwards, 1922)
- Aedes kiangsiensis (Tung, 1955)
- Aedes lophoventralis (Theobald, 1910)
- Aedes melanopterus (Giles, 1904)
- Aedes plumiferus (King and Hoogstraal, 1946)
- Aedes prominens (Barraud, 1923)
- Aedes stevensoni (Barraud, 1923)
- Aedes watasei (Yamada, 1921)

=== Subgenus (Polyleptiomyia) Theobald, 1905 ===
- Aedes albocephalus (Theobald, 1903)
- Aedes gandarai Cunha Ramos, Capela, and Ribeiro 1995)

=== Subgenus (Protomacleaya) Theobald, 1907 ===
- Aedes aitkeni Schick, 1970
- Aedes alboapicus Schick, 1970
- Aedes amabilis Schick, 1970
- Aedes argyrothorax Bonne-Wepster and Bonne, 1920
- Aedes berlini Schick, 1970
- Aedes bertrami Schick, 1970
- Aedes braziliensis Gordon and Evans, 1922
- Aedes brelandi Zavortink, 1972
- Aedes buenaventura Schick, 1970
- Aedes burgeri Zavortink, 1972
- Aedes campana Schick, 1970
- Aedes casali Schick, 1970
- Aedes chionotum Zavortink, 1972
- Aedes daryi Schick, 1970
- Aedes diazi Schick, 1970
- Aedes gabriel Schick, 1970
- Aedes galindoi Schick, 1970
- Aedes hendersoni Cockerell, 1918

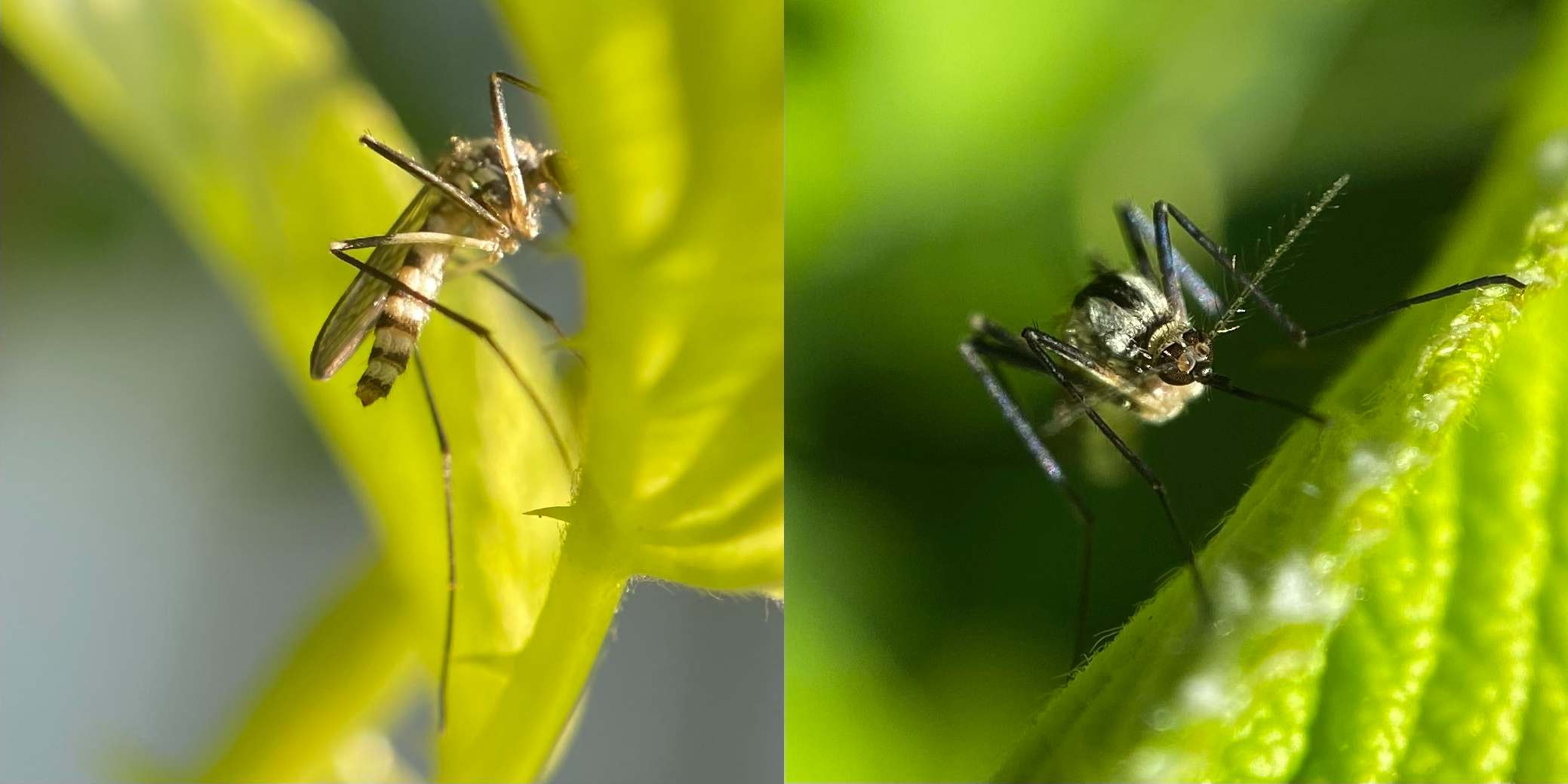
A. hendersoni

- Aedes heteropus Dyar, 1921
- Aedes homoeopus Dyar, 1922
- Aedes idanus Schick, 1970
- Aedes impostor Schick, 1970
- Aedes insolitus (Coquillett, 1906)
- Aedes knabi (Coquillett, 1906)
- Aedes kompi Vargas and Downs, 1950
- Aedes lewnielseni Ortega and Zavortink, 2019
- Aedes metoecapus Dyar, 1925
- Aedes niveoscutum Zavortink, 1972
- Aedes podographicus Dyar and Knab, 1906
- Aedes sandrae Zavortink, 1972
- Aedes schicki Zavortink, 1972
- Aedes schroederi Schick, 1970
- Aedes sumidero Schick, 1970
- Aedes tehuantepec Schick, 1970
- Aedes terrens (Walker, 1856)
- Aedes thorntoni Dyar and Knab, 1907
- Aedes triseriatus (Say, 1823) (eastern treehole mosquito)
- Aedes vargasi Schick, 1970
- Aedes zavortinki Schick, 1970
- Aedes zoosophus Dyar and Knab, 1918

=== Subgenus (Pseudalbuginosus) Huang and Rueda, 2015 ===
- Aedes grjebinei Hamon, Taufflieb and Maillot, 1957

=== Subgenus (Pseudarmigeres) Stone and Knight, 1956 ===
- Aedes albomarginatus (Newstead, 1907)
- Aedes argenteoventralis (Theobald, 1909)
  - Aedes argenteoventralis argenteoventralis (Theobald, 1909)
  - Aedes argenteoventralis dunni (Evans, 1928)
- Aedes kummi Edwards, 1930
- Aedes michaelikati van Someren, 1946
  - Aedes michaelikati gurneri van Someren, 1946
  - Aedes michaelikati michaelikati van Someren, 1946
- Aedes natalensis Edwards, 1930

=== Subgenus (Pseudoskusea) Theobald, 1907 ===
- Aedes bancroftianus Edwards, 1921
- Aedes culiciformis (Theobald, 1905)
- Aedes multiplex (Theobald, 1903)
- Aedes postpiraculosus Dobrotworsky, 1961

=== Subgenus (Rampamyia) Reinert, Harbach and Kitching, 2006 ===
- Aedes albilabris Edwards, 1925
- Aedes notoscriptus (Skuse, 1889)
  - Aedes notoscriptus montana Brug, 1939
  - Aedes notoscriptus notoscriptus Skuse, 1889
- Aedes quinquelineatus Edwards, 1922

=== Subgenus (Reinertia) Somboon, Namgay and Harbach in Somboon, Phanitchakun, Saingamsook, Namgay and Harbach, 2021 ===
- Aedes suffusus Edwards, 1922

=== Subgenus (Rhinoskusea) Edwards, 1929 ===
- Aedes longirostris (Leicester, 1908)
- Aedes pillaii Mattingly, 1958
- Aedes portonovoensis Tewari and Hiriyan, 1992
- Aedes wardi Reinert, 1976

=== Subgenus (Rusticoidus) Shevchenko and Prudkina, 1973 ===
- Aedes albescens Edwards, 1921
- Aedes bicristatus Thurman and Winkler, 1950
- Aedes krymmontanus Alekseev, 1989
- Aedes lepidonotus Edwards, 1920
- Aedes provocans (Walker, 1848)

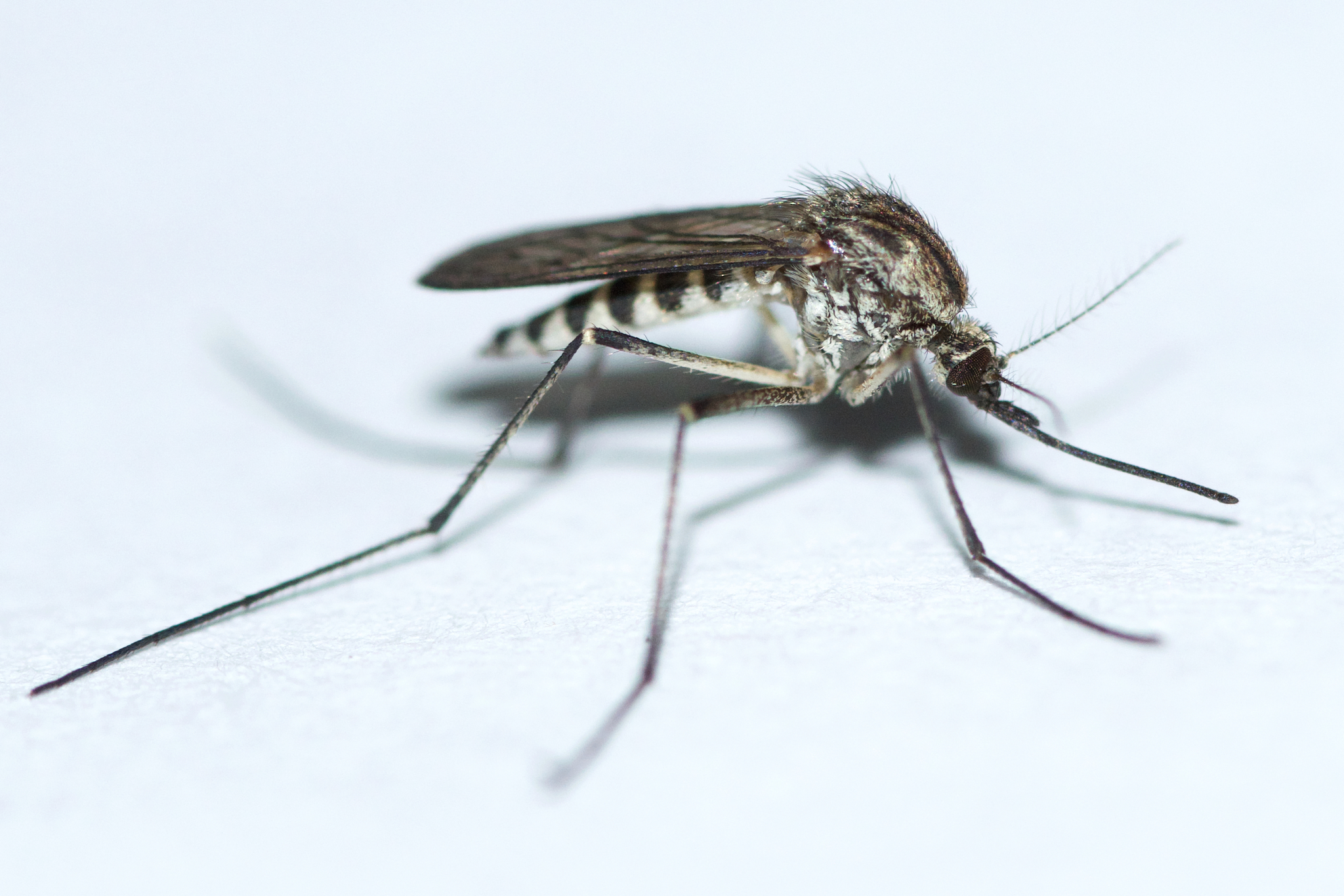
A. provocans

- Aedes quasirusticus Torres Cañamares, 1951
- Aedes refiki Medschid, 1928
- Aedes rusticus (Rossi, 1790)
  - Aedes rusticus rusticus Rossi, 1790
  - Aedes rusticus subtrichurus Martini, 1927
- Aedes subdiversus Martini, 1926

=== Subgenus (Sallumia) Reinert, Harbach and Kitching, 2008 ===
- Aedes hortator Dyar and Knab, 1907
- Aedes perventor Cerqueira and Costa, 1946

=== Subgenus (Scutomyia) Theobald, 1904 ===
- Aedes albolineatus (Theobald, 1904)
- Aedes arboricolus Knight and Rozeboom, 1946
- Aedes bambusicolus Knight and Rozeboom, 1946
- Aedes boharti Knight and Rozeboom, 1946
- Aedes hoogstraali Knight and Rozeboom, 1946
- Aedes impatibilis (Walker, 1859)
- Aedes laffooni Knight and Rozeboom, 1946
- Aedes platylepidus Knight and Hull, 1951
- Aedes pseudoalbolineatus Brug, 1939

=== Subgenus (Skusea) Theobald, 1903 ===
- Aedes cartroni Ventrillon, 1906
- Aedes lambrechti van Someren, 1971
- Aedes moucheti Ravaonjanahary and Brunhes, 1977
- Aedes pembaensis Theobald, 1901

=== Subgenus (Stegomyia) Theobald, 1901 ===
- Aedes aegypti (Linnaeus, 1762) - yellow fever mosquito,
  - Aedes aegypti aegypti (Linnaeus, 1762)
  - Aedes aegypti formosus (Walker, 1848)
- Aedes africanus (Theobald, 1901) yellow fever mosquito
- Aedes agrihanensis Bohart, 1957
- Aedes albopictus Skuse, 1895 - forest day mosquito, Asian tiger mosquito, tiger mosquito
- Aedes alcasidi Huang, 1972
- Aedes alorensis Bonne-Wepster and Brug, 1932
- Aedes amaltheus De Meillon and Lavoipierre, 1944
- Aedes andrewsi Edwards, 1926
- Aedes angustus Edwards, 1935
- Aedes annandalei (Theobald, 1910)
  - Aedes annandalei annandalei (Theobald, 1910)
  - Aedes annandalei quadricinctus Barraud, 1923
- Aedes aobae Belkin, 1962
- Aedes apicoargenteus (Theobald, 1909)
- Aedes bambusae Edwards, 1935
- Aedes blacklocki Evans, 1925
- Aedes bromeliae (Theobald, 1911)
- Aedes burnsi Basio and Reisen, 1971
- Aedes calceatus Edwards, 1924
- Aedes chaussieri Edwards, 1923
- Aedes chemulpoensis Yamada, 1921
- Aedes contiguus Edwards, 1936
- Aedes cooki Belkin, 1962
- Aedes corneti Huang, 1986
- Aedes craggi ( Barraud, 1923)
- Aedes cretinus Edwards, 1921

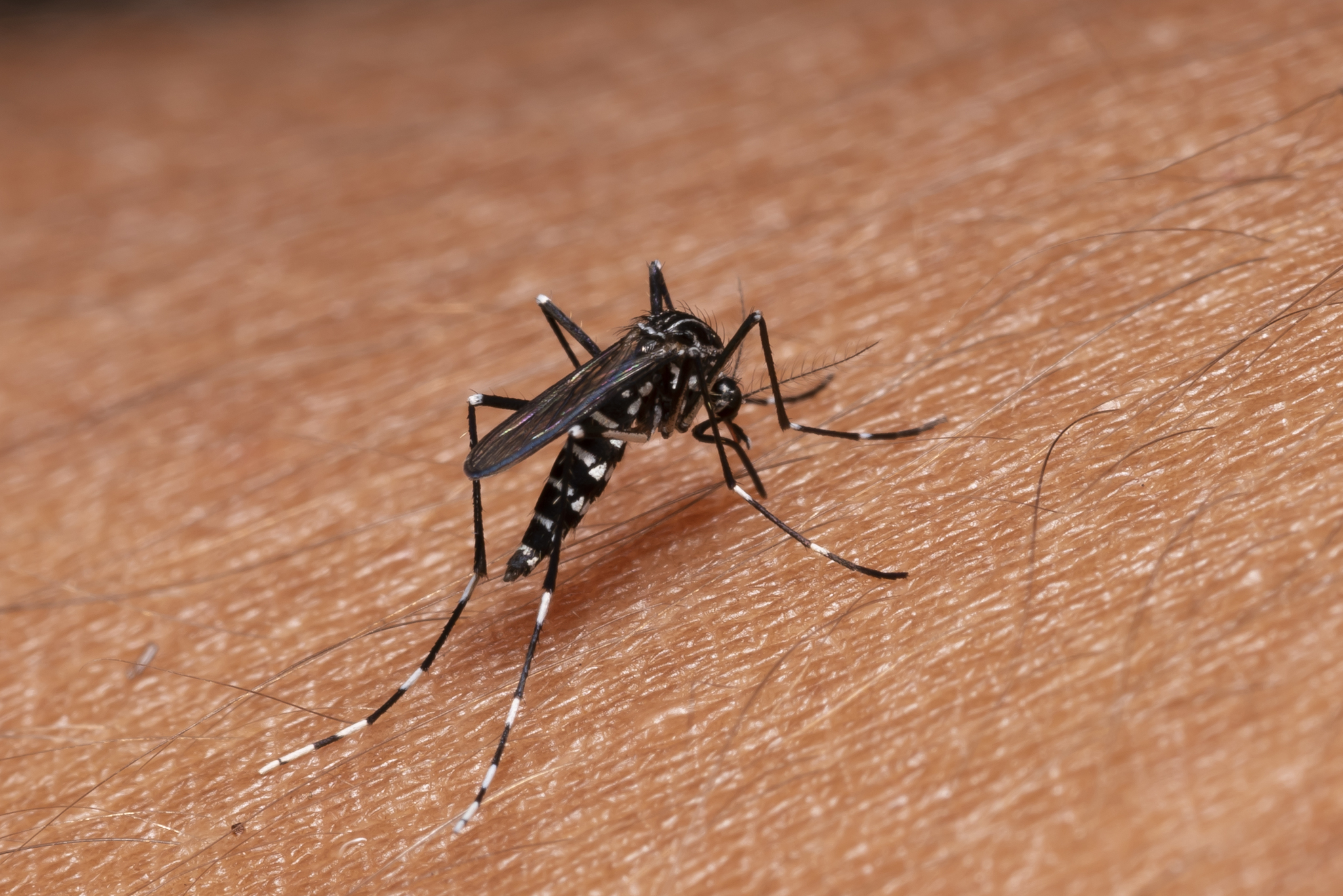
A. cretinus

- Aedes daitensis Miyagi and Toma, 1981
- Aedes deboeri Edwards, 1926
- Aedes demeilloni Edwards, 1936
- Aedes denderensis Wolfs, 1949
- Aedes dendrophilus Edwards, 1921
- Aedes desmotes (Giles, 1904)
- Aedes dybasi Bohart, 1957
- Aedes ealaensis Huang, 2004
- Aedes edwardsi ( Barraud, 1923)
- Aedes ethiopiensis Huang, 2004
- Aedes flavopictus Yamada, 1921
  - Aedes flavopictus flavopictus Yamada, 1921
  - Aedes flavopictus miyarai Tanaka, Mizusawa and Saugstad, 1979
  - Aedes flavopictus downsi Bohart and Ingram, 1946
- Aedes fraseri (Edwards, 1912)
- Aedes futunae Belkin, 1962
- Aedes gallois Yamada, 1921
- Aedes galloisiodes Liu and Lu, 1984
- Aedes gandaensis Huang, 2004
- Aedes gardnerii (Ludlow, 1905)
  - Aedes gardnerii gardnerii Ludlow, 1905
  - Aedes gardnerii imitator Leicester, 1908
- Aedes grantii (Theobald, 1901)
- Aedes guamensis Farner and Bohart, 1944
- Aedes gurneyiStone and Bohart, 1944
- Aedes hakanssoni Knight and Hurlbut, 1949
- Aedes hansfordi Huang, 1997
- Aedes hebrideus Edwards, 1926
- Aedes heischi van Someren, 1951
- Aedes hensilli Farner, 1945
- Aedes hogsbackensis Huang, 2004
- Aedes hoguei Belkin, 1962
- Aedes horrescens Edwards, 1935
- Aedes josiahae Huang, 1988
- Aedes katherinensis Woodhill, 1949
- Aedes keniensis van Someren, 1946
- Aedes kenyae van Someren, 1946
- Aedes kesseli Huang and Hitchcock, 1980
- Aedes kivuensis Edwards, 1941
- Aedes krombeini Huang, 1975
- Aedes langata van Someren, 1946
- Aedes ledgeri Huang, 1981
- Aedes lilii (Theobald, 1910)
- Aedes luteocephalus (Newstead,1907)
- Aedes maehleri Bohart, 1957
- Aedes malayensis Colless, 1962
- Aedes malikuli Huang, 1973
- Aedes marshallensis Stone and Bohart, 1944
- Aedes mascarensis MacGregor, 1924
- Aedes masseyi Edwards, 1923
- Aedes matinglyorum Huang, 1994
- Aedes maxgermaini Huang, 1990
- Aedes mediopunctatus (Theobald, 1905)
  - Aedes mediopunctatus mediopunctatus Theobald, 1905
  - Aedes mediopunctatus sureilensis Barraud, 1934
- Aedes metallicus ( Edwards, 1912)
- Aedes mickevichae Huang, 1988
- Aedes mpusiensis Huang, 2004
- Aedes muroafcete Huang, 1997
- Aedes neoafricanus Cornet, Valade and Dieng, 1978
- Aedes neogalloisi Chen and H B Chen, 2000
- Aedes neopandani Bohart, 1957
- Aedes njombiensis Huang, 1997
- Aedes novalbopictus Barraud, 1931
- Aedes opok Corbet and van Someren, 1962
- Aedes palauensis Bohart, 1957
- Aedes pandani Stone, 1939
- Aedes patriciae Mattingly, 1954
- Aedes paullusi Stone and Farner, 1945
- Aedes pernotatus Farner and Bohart, 1944
- Aedes perplexus (Leicester, 1908)
- Aedes pia (Le Goff and Robert in Le Goff et al, 2013)
- Aedes polynesiensis Marks, 1951
- Aedes poweri (Theobald, 1905)

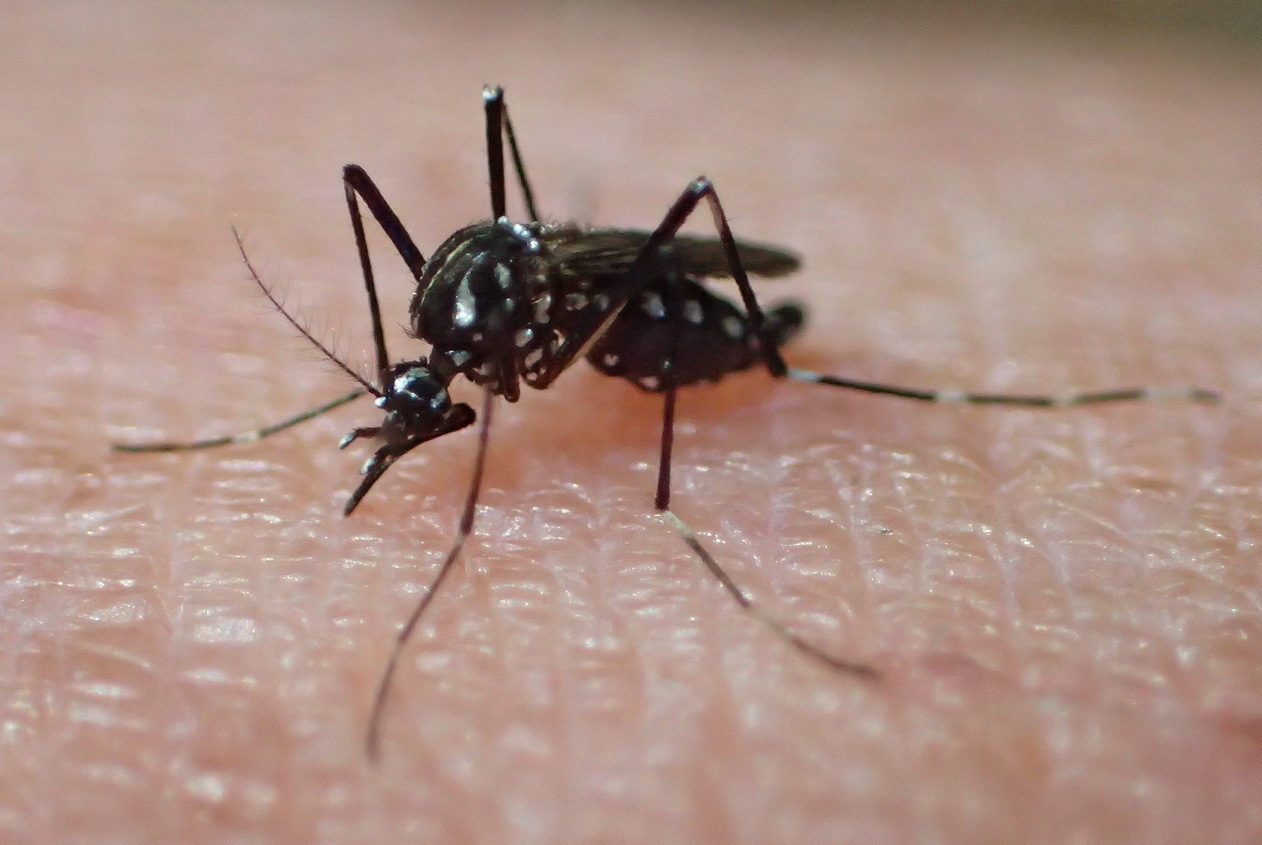
A. poweri

- Aedes pseudoafricanus Chwatt, 1949
- Aedes pseudoalbopictus (Borel, 1928)
- Aedes pseudonigeria (Theobald, 1910)
- Aedes pseudoscutellaris (Theobald, 1910)
- Aedes quasiscutellaris Farner and Bohart, 1944
- Aedes rhungkiangensis P-X Chang and S M Chang, 1974
- Aedes riversi Bohart and Ingram, 1946
- Aedes robinsoni Belkin, 1962
- Aedes rotanus Bohart and Ingram, 1946
- Aedes rotumae Belkin, 1962
- Aedes ruwenzori Haddow and van Someren, 1950
- Aedes saimedres Huang, 1988
- Aedes saipanensisStone, 1945
- Aedes sampi Huang, 2004
- Aedes schwetzi Edwards, 1926
- Aedes scutellaris (Walker, 1859)
- Aedes scutoscriptus Bohart and Ingram, 1946
- Aedes seampi Huang, 1974
- Aedes seatoi Huang, 1969
- Aedes segermanae Huang, 1997
- Aedes sibiricus Danilov and Filippova, 1978
- Aedes simpsoni (Theobald, 1905)
- Aedes soleatus Edwards, 1924
- Aedes strelitziae Muspratt, 1950
- Aedes subalbopictus Barraud, 1931
- Aedes subargenteus Edwards, 1925
- Aedes tabu Ramalingam and Belkin, 1965
- Aedes tongae Edwards, 1926
- Aedes tulagiensis Edwards, 1926
- Aedes unilineatus (Theobald, 1906)
- Aedes upolensis Marks, 1957
- Aedes usambara Mattingly, 1953
- Aedes varuae Belkin, 1962
- Aedes vinsoni Mattingly, 1953
- Aedes w-albus (Theobald, 1905)
- Aedes wadai Tanaka, Mizusawa and Saugstad, 1979
- Aedes woodi Edwards, 1922
- Aedes unalom (Maquart & Hide, 2024)

=== Subgenus (Tanakaius) Reinert, Harbach and Kitching, 2004 ===
- Aedes savoryi Bohart, 1957
- Aedes togoi Theobald, 1907

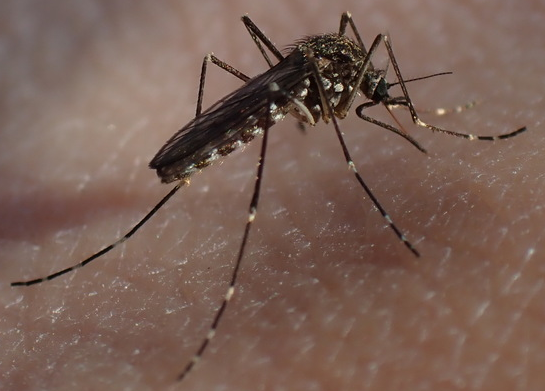
A. togoi

=== Subgenus (Tewarius) Reinert, 2006 ===
- Aedes agastyai Tewari and Hiriyan, 1992
- Aedes nummatus Edwards, 1923
- Aedes pseudonummatus Reinert, 1973
- Aedes reubenae Tewari and Hiriyan, 1992

=== Subgenus (Vansomerenis) Reinert, Harbach and Kitching, 2006 ===
- Aedes hancocki van Someren, 1962
- Aedes luteostriatus Robinson, 1950
- Aedes pulchrithorax Edwards, 1939

=== Subgenus (Zavortinkius) Reinert, 1999 ===
- Aedes brunhesi Reinert, 1999
- Aedes brygooi Brunhes, 1971
- Aedes fulgens (Edwards, 1917)
- Aedes geoffroyi Reinert, 1999
- Aedes huangae Reinert, 1999
- Aedes interruptus Reinert, 1999
- Aedes longipalpis (Grünberg, 1905)
- Aedes monetus Edwards, 1935
- Aedes mzooi van Someren, 1962
- Aedes phillipi van Someren, 1949
- Aedes pollinctor (Graham, 1910)

=== Subgenus (Orohylomyia) Somboon & Harbach, 2023 ===
- Aedes yunnanensis (Gaschen, 1934)

=== Uncertain subgenus ===
The genus contains 28 species that are not placed in a further subgenus:

- Aedes daliensis (Taylor, 1916)
- Aedes mallochi Taylor, 1944
- Aedes alticola Bonne Wepster, 1948
- Aedes auronitens Edwards, 1922
- Aedes australiensis (Theobald, 1910)
- Aedes biocellatus (Taylor, 1914)
- Aedes britteni Marks and Hodgkin, 1958
- Aedes candidoscutellum Marks, 1947
- Aedes crossi Lien, 1967
- Aedes eatoni (Edwards, 1916)
- Aedes gracilelineatus Bonne-Wepster, 1937
- Aedes keefei King and Hoogstraal, 1946
- Aedes peipingensis Feng, 1938
- Aedes koreicoides Sasa, Kano and Hayashi, 1950
- Aedes lauriei King and Hoogstraal, 1946
- Aedes monocellatus Marks, 1948
- Aedes oreophilus (Edwards, 1916)
- Aedes plagosus Marks, 1959
- Aedes quasirubithorax (Theobald, 1910)
- Aedes roai Belkin, 1962
- Aedes rubiginosus Belkin, 1962
- Aedes sintoni (Barraud, 1924)
- Aedes stanleyi Peters, 1963
- Aedes subauridorsum Marks, 1948
- Aedes toxopeusi Bonne-Wepster, 1948
- Aedes tsiliensis King and Hoogstraal, 1946
- Aedes versicolor (Barraud, 1924)
- Aedes wasselli Marks, 1947
- Aedes annuliventris Blanchard, 1852
