= List of Culex species =

This is a list of described Culex species around the world, as of 2006. Subspecies have been omitted. There are possibly errors and inaccuracies in this list that stem from the conversion from the source. Please check the original source when in doubt.

== Subgenus Acalleomyia Leicester ==
- Culex obscurus (Leicester, 1908) — Indonesia, Malaysia

== Subgenus Acallyntrum Stone & Penn ==
- Culex axillicola Steffan, 1979 — Papua New Guinea
- Culex belkini Stone & Penn, 1948 — Solomon Islands
- Culex bicki Stone & Penn, 1947 — Indonesia
- Culex binigrolineatus Knight & Rozeboom, 1945 — Indonesia
- Culex bougainvillensis Steffan, 1979 — Solomon Islands
- Culex miyagii Mogi & Toma, 1999 — Indonesia
- Culex pallidiceps (Theobald, 1905) — Papua New Guinea
- Culex perkinsi Stone & Penn, 1948 — Solomon Islands

== Subgenus Aedinus Lutz ==
- Culex accelerans Root, 1927 — Brazil, Panama, Trinidad and Tobago, French Guiana
- Culex amazonensis (Lutz, 1905) — Brazil, Colombia, Panama, Suriname, Trinidad and Tobago, Venezuela, French Guiana
- Culex clastrieri Casal & Garcia, 1968 — Brazil
- Culex guyanensis Clastrier, 1970 — French Guiana
- Culex hildebrandi Evans, 1923
- Culex paraplesia Dyar, 1922
- Culex tapena Dyar, 1919

== Subgenus Afroculex Danilov ==
- Culex lineata (Theobald, 1912) — Mozambique, South Africa

== Subgenus Allimanta Casal & Garcia ==
- Culex tramazayguesi Duret, 1954 — Argentina

== Subgenus Anoedioporpa Dyar ==
- Culex bamborum Rozeboom & Komp, 1948 — Colombia
- Culex belemensis Duret & Damasceno, 1955 — Brazil, French Guiana
- Culex bifoliata Dyar, 1922
- Culex browni Komp, 1936 — Colombia, Panama
- Culex canaanensis Lane & Whitman, 1943 — Brazil
- Culex chaguanco Casal, Garcia, & Fernandez, 1968 — Argentina
- Culex chalcocorystes Martini, 1914
- Culex conservator Dyar & Knab, 1906 — Belize, Brazil, Colombia, Costa Rica, Guatemala, Honduras, Mexico, Panama, Peru, Suriname, Trinidad and Tobago, Venezuela, Lesser Antilles
- Culex corrigani Dyar & Knab, 1907 — Colombia, Costa Rica, Nicaragua, Panama
- Culex damascenoi Duret, 1969 — Brazil
- Culex divisior Dyar & Knab, 1906
- Culex luteopleurus (Theobald, 1903) — Brazil
- Culex menui Clastrier, 1971 — French Guiana
- Culex originator Gordon & Evans, 1922 — Brazil, Grenada, French Guiana
- Culex paganus Evans, 1923 — Brazil, Venezuela
- Culex quasioriginator Duret, 1972 — Brazil
- Culex restrictor Dyar & Knab, 1906 — Belize, Costa Rica, El Salvador, Honduras, Mexico, Panama
- Culex surukumensis Anduze, 1941

== Subgenus Barraudius Edwards ==
- Culex modestus Ficalbi, 1889 — Algeria, China, Czech Republic, Greece, Hungary, Iran, Iraq, Israel, Italy, Mongolia, Morocco, Poland, Romania, Russia, Slovakia, Spain, Tajikistan, Turkey, United Kingdom
- Culex eadithae Barraud, 1924
- Culex nudipalpis Shingarev, 1927
- Culex tanajcus Stschelkanovzev, 1926 — Japan, Korea
- Culex pusillus Macquart, 1850 — Algeria, Egypt, Greece, Iran, Iraq, Libya, Saudi Arabia, Sudan, Syria, Tajikistan, Tunisia, Turkey, Turkmenistan, United Arab Emirates, Uzbekistan
- Culex richeti Brunhes & Venhard, 1966 — Nigeria

== Subgenus Belkinomyia Adames & Galindo ==
- Culex eldridgei Adames & Galindo, 1973 — Colombia

== Subgenus Carrollia Lutz ==
- Culex anduzei Cerqueira & Lane, 1944 — Brazil
- Culex antunesi Lane & Whitman, 1943 — Brazil, Colombia, Costa Rica, Panama, French Guiana
- Culex monaensis Floch & Fauran, 1955
- Culex babahoyensis Levi-Castillo, 1953 — Costa Rica, Ecuador, Nicaragua
- Culex bihaicola Dyar & Nunez Tovar, 1927 — Colombia, Costa Rica, Ecuador, Guatemala, Mexico, Panama, Venezuela
- Culex bonnei Dyar, 1921 — Brazil, Colombia, Ecuador, Suriname, French Guiana
- Culex cerqueirai Valencia, 1973 — Panama
- Culex guerreroi Cova Garcia, Sutil, & Pulido, 1971 — Venezuela
- Culex infoliatus Bonne-Wepster & Bonne, 1919 — Brazil, Ecuador, Peru, Suriname, Venezuela, French Guiana
- Culex insigniforceps Clastrier & Claustre, 1978 — French Guiana
- Culex iridescens (Lutz, 1905) — Brazil
- Culex kompi Valencia, 1973 — Colombia
- Culex metempsytus Dyar, 1921 — Colombia, Costa Rica, Guatemala, Panama
- Culex rausseoi Cova Garcia, Sutil & Pulido, 1972 — Venezuela
- Culex secundus Bonne-Wepster & Bonne, 1919 — Brazil, Colombia, Costa Rica, Ecuador, Panama
- Culex soperi Antunes & Lane, 1937 — Argentina, Brazil
- Culex urichii (Coquillett, 1906) — Belize, Bolivia, Brazil, Colombia, Costa Rica, Ecuador, Panama, Peru, Suriname, Trinidad and Tobago, Venezuela
- Culex mathesoni Anduze, 1942
- Culex wannonii Cova Garcia & Sutil Oramus, 1976 — Venezuela
- Culex wilsoni Lane & Whitman, 1943 — Brazil, Colombia

== Subgenus Culex Linnaeus ==
- Culex abnormalis Lane, 1936 — Brazil, Colombia
- Culex abyssinicus Van Someren, 1945 — Angola, Cameroon, Central African Republic, Congo, Ghana, Kenya, Namibia, Senegal, Sierra Leone, South Africa, Sudan, Zaire
- Culex accraensis Theobald, 1909
- Culex acer Walker, 1848
- Culex acharistus Root, 1927 — Argentina, Brazil, Chile
- Culex adelae Baisas, 1938
- Culex aestuans Wiedemann, 1828
- Culex affinis Adams, 1903
- Culex afridii Qutubuddin., 1956
- Culex agilis Bigot, 1889
- Culex aglischrus Dyar, 1924
- Culex aikenii Dyar & Knab, 1908
- Culex alani Forattini, 1965 — Colombia
- Culex albertoi Anduze, 1943
- Culex albigenu Enderlein, 1920
- Culex albinervis Edwards, 1929 — Fiji, Tonga
- Culex albolineatus Giles, 1901
- Culex albovirgetus Graham, 1910
- Culex albus Leicester, 1908
- Culex alienus Colless, 1957 — Malaysia, Singapore, Thailand, Vietnam
- Culex alis Theobald, 1903 — Indonesia, Malaysia, Philippines, Singapore, Taiwan, Thailand, Vietnam
- Culex alpha Seguy., 1924
- Culex alticola Martini, 1931
- Culex ambiguus Theobald, 1903
- Culex ameliae Casal, 1967 — Argentina
- Culex anarmostus Theobald, 1903
- Culex andersoni Edwards, 1914 — Kenya, Malawi, Tanzania, Uganda, Zaire, Ethiopia
- Culex annulata Taylor, 1914
- Culex annulioris Theobald, 1901 — Zimbabwe, Tropical Africa
- Culex annulirostris Skuse, 1889 — Australia, Fiji, Indonesia, Kiribati, Nauru, Palau, Papua New Guinea, Philippines, Solomon Islands, Tonga, Vanuatu, New Caledonia, Tuvalu, Cook Islands
- Culex annuliventris (Blanchard, 1852. In Gay 1852) — Chile
- Culex annulus Theobald, 1901 — China, Indonesia, Philippines
- Culex antennatus (Becker, 1903) — Angola, Botswana, Egypt, Iran, Israel, Jordan, Madagascar
- Culex anxifer Bigot, 1859
- Culex apicinus Philippi, 1865 — Bolivia, Chile, Peru
- Culex aquarius Strickman, 1990 — Costa Rica
- Culex aquilus Graham, 1910
- Culex arabiensis Theobald, 1913
- Culex archegus Dyar, 1929 — Colombia, Ecuador, Peru
- Culex argenteopunctatus (Ventrillon, 1905) — Madagascar, Mozambique
- Culex argenteus Ludlow, 1905
- Culex articularis Philippi, 1865 — Argentina, Chile, Ecuador, Peru
- Culex aseyehae Dyar & Knab, 1915
- Culex asteliae Belkin, 1968 — New Zealand
- Culex astridianus de Meillon, 1942 — Zaire
- Culex ataeniatus Theobald, 1911 — South Africa
- Culex atriceps Edwards, 1926 — French Polynesia
- Culex aurantapex Edwards, 1914 — Kenya, Mozambique, South Africa, Zaire, Ethiopia
- Culex auritaenia Enderlein, 1920
- Culex australicus Dobrotworsky & Drummond, 1953 — Australia
- Culex autogenicus Roubaud, 1935
- Culex autumnalis Weyenbergh, 1882
- Culex azoriensis Theobald, 1903
- Culex azuayus Levi-Castillo, 1954
- Culex badgeri Dyar, 1924
- Culex bahamensis Dyar & Knab, 1906 — Bahamas, Cuba, Jamaica, United States, Puerto Rico, Virgin Islands, Grand Cayman Islands
- Culex bancroftii Theobald, 1901
- Culex banksensis Maffi & Tenorio, 1977 — Vanuatu
- Culex barbarus Dyar & Knab, 1906
- Culex barraudi Edwards, 1922 — China, India, Nepal, Pakistan, Sri Lanka, Thailand
- Culex basicinctus Edwards, 1922
- Culex beauperthuyi Anduze, 1943
- Culex berbericus Roubaud, 1935
- Culex beta Séguy, 1924 — Algeria
- Culex bickleyi Forattini, 1965 — Colombia
- Culex bicolor Meigen, 1818
- Culex bidens Dyar, 1922 — Argentina, Bolivia, Brazil, Mexico, Paraguay, Uruguay, Venezuela
- Culex bifoliata Theobald, 1905
- Culex bifurcatus Linnaeus, 1758
- Culex bihamatus Edwards, 1926 — Indonesia
- Culex bilineatus Theobald, 1903
- Culex biocellatus Theobald, 1903
- Culex bipunctata Theobald, 1907
- Culex biroi Theobald, 1905
- Culex boneriensis Brethes, 1916
- Culex bonneae Dyar & Knab, 1919 — Brazil, Colombia, Costa Rica, Panama, Suriname, French Guiana
- Culex brami Forattini, Rabello, & Lopes, 1967 — Brazil
- Culex brehmei Knab, 1916
- Culex brethesi Dyar, 1919 — Argentina, Uruguay
- Culex brevispinosus Bonne-Wepster & Bonne, 1919 — Brazil, Colombia, Suriname, Venezuela
- Culex brumpti Galliard, 1931 — France, Morocco
- Culex bukavuensis Wolfs, 1947 — Zaire
- Culex calcitrans Robineau-Desvoidy, 1827
- Culex calloti Rioux & Pech, 1959
- Culex calurus Edwards, 1935 — Kenya
- Culex camposi Dyar, 1925 — Colombia, Ecuador, Peru
- Culex caraibeus Howard, Dyar, & Knab, 1912
- Culex carcinoxenus De Oliveira Castro, 1932 — Brazil
- Culex carleti Brunhes & Ravaonjanahary, 1971 — Madagascar, Comoros
- Culex carmodyae Dyar & Knab, 1906
- Culex cartroni Ventrillon, 1905
- Culex castelli Hamon, 1957 — Côte d'Ivoire
- Culex castroi Casal & Garcia, 1967 — Argentina, Uruguay
- Culex cheni Ho., 1963
- Culex chidesteri Dyar, 1921 — Argentina, Belize, Brazil, Colombia, Costa Rica, Cuba, Ecuador, Jamaica, Mexico, Panama, Paraguay, United States, Uruguay, Venezuela, Puerto Rico, Lesser Antilles
- Culex chitae Duret, 1967 — Colombia
- Culex chloroventer Theobald, 1909
- Culex chorleyi Edwards, 1941 — Ethiopia, South Africa, Uganda, Zaire
- Culex christophersii Theobald, 1907
- Culex cingulatus Doleschall, 1856
- Culex comitatus Dyar & Knab, 1909
- Culex comorensis Brunhes, 1977 — Comoros
- Culex condylodesmus Gruenberg, 1905
- Culex confusus Baisas, 1938
- Culex congolensis Evans, 1923
- Culex consimilis Taylor, 1913
- Culex consobrinus Robineau-Desvoidy, 1827
- Culex cornutus Edwards, 1922 — India
- Culex coronator Dyar & Knab, 1906 — Argentina, Belize, Bolivia, Brazil, Colombia, Costa Rica, El Salvador, Guatemala, Honduras, Nicaragua, Panama, Paraguay, Peru, Suriname, Trinidad and Tobago, United States, Uruguay, Venezuela, French Guiana
- Culex covagarciai Porattini, — Venezuela
- Culex creticus Theobald, 1903
- Culex crinicauda Edwards, 1921 — Australia
- Culex cubensis Bigot, 1857
- Culex cuneatus Theobald, 1901
- Culex curvibrachius Angulo, 1993 — Chile
- Culex cuyanus Duret, 1968 — Argentina
- Culex deanei Correa & Ramalho, 1959
- Culex debilis Dyar & Knab, 1914
- Culex decens Theobald, 1901 — Ghana, Nigeria, Sierra Leone, South Africa, Yemen, Comoros
- Culex declarator Dyar & Knab, 1906 — Belize, Bolivia, Brazil, Costa Rica, El Salvador, Guyana, Mexico, Panama, Paraguay, Suriname, Trinidad and Tobago, United States, Uruguay, Venezuela, French Guiana, Lesser Antilles
- Culex delys Howard, Dyar, & Knab, 1915 — Panama
- Culex demeilloni Doucet, 1950 — Madagascar
- Culex dictator Dyar & Knab, 1909
- Culex didieri Neveu-Lemaire, 1906
- Culex diengensis Brug, 1931 — Indonesia
- Culex diplophyllum Dyar, 1929 — Peru
- Culex dipseticus Dyar & Knab, 1909
- Culex disjunctus Roubaud, 1957
- Culex dissimilis Theobald, 1901
- Culex dohenyi Hogue, 1975 — Costa Rica
- Culex doleschallii Giles, 1900
- Culex doliorum Edwards, 1912
- Culex dolosus (Lynch Arribalzaga, 1891) — Argentina, Bolivia, Brazil, Chile, Ecuador, Paraguay, Uruguay
- Culex domesticus Leicester, 1908
- Culex duplicator Dyar & Knab, 1909 — Dominican Republic, Haiti
- Culex duttoni Theobald, 1901 — Angola, Benin, Cameroon, Ethiopia, Ghana, Kenya, Malawi, Nigeria, Senegal, Sierra Leone, South Africa, Sudan, Tanzania, Uganda, Yemen, Zimbabwe, Equatorial Guinea
- Culex eduardoi Casal & Garcia, 1968 — Argentina
- Culex edwardsi Barraud, 1923 — Australia, India, Nepal, Philippines, Sri Lanka
- Culex eleuthera Dyar, 1917
- Culex elocutilis Dyar & Knab, 1909
- Culex epidesmus (Theobald, 1910) — Bangladesh, India, Nepal, Pakistan, Sri Lanka
- Culex equivocator Dyar & Knab, 1907
- Culex erectus Iglisch., 1977
- Culex eremita Howard, Dyar, & Knab, 1912
- Culex erythrothorax Dyar, 1907 — Mexico, United States
- Culex escomeli Brethes, 1920
- Culex euclastus Theobald, 1903 — Congo, Nigeria, Uganda, Zaire
- Culex eumimetes Dyar & Knab, 1908
- Culex exilis Dyar, 1924
- Culex extricator Dyar & Knab, 1906
- Culex factor Dyar & Knab, 1906
- Culex fasciatus Mueller, 1764
- Culex fasyi Baisas, 1938 — Philippines
- Culex fatigans Wiedemann, 1828
- Culex federalis Dyar, 1923
- Culex fernandezi Casal, Garcia & Cavalieri, 1966 — Argentina
- Culex finlayi Perez Vigueras, 1956
- Culex foliaceus Lane, 1945 — Brazil
- Culex forattinii Correa & Ramalho, 1959
- Culex fouchowensis Theobald, 1901
- Culex fuscifurcatus Edwards, 1934
- Culex fuscitarsis Barraud, 1924
- Culex fuscocephala Theobald, 1907 — Bangladesh, Cambodia, China, India, Indonesia, Japan, Laos, Malaysia, Nepal, Pakistan, Philippines, Singapore, Sri Lanka, Taiwan, Vietnam
- Culex fuscus Theobald, 1909
- Culex gambiensis Theobald, 1903
- Culex gameti Bailly-Choumara, 1966 — Cameroon
- Culex garciai Broche, 2000 — Cuba
- Culex gelidus Theobald, 1901 — Bangladesh, Cambodia, China, India, Indonesia, Japan, Malaysia, Nepal, Pakistan, Philippines, Sri Lanka, Taiwan, Thailand, Vietnam, Myanmar
- Culex geminus Colless, 1955 — Malaysia, Singapore
- Culex giganteus Ventrillon, 1906 — Madagascar
- Culex globocoxitus Dobrotworsky, 1953 — Australia
- Culex gnophodes Theobald, 1903
- Culex goughii Theobald, 1911
- Culex grahamii Theobald, 1910 — Angola, Burkina Faso, Cameroon, Central African Republic, Congo, Gambia, Ghana, Kenya, Liberia, Madagascar, Nigeria, Senegal, Sudan, Togo, Uganda, Zaire
- Culex guayasi Levi-Castillo, 1953 — Ecuador
- Culex guiarti Blanchard, 1905 — Burkina Faso, Cameroon, Central African Republic, Congo, Gabon, Gambia, Kenya, Liberia, Madagascar, Mali, Mozambique, Nigeria, Senegal, South Africa, Sudan, Tanzania, Uganda, Zaire
- Culex guizhouensis Chen & Zhao, 1985 — China
- Culex habilitator Dyar & Knab, 1906 — Dominican Republic, Peru, Trinidad and Tobago, Puerto Rico, Lesser Antilles
- Culex haematophagus Ficalbi, 1893
- Culex hancocki Edwards, 1930 — Kenya, Uganda
- Culex hensemaeon Dyar, 1920
- Culex hepperi Casal & Garcia, 1967 — Argentina, Uruguay
- Culex hirsutipelpis Theobald, 1901
- Culex hopkinsi Edwards, 1932 — Uganda, Zaire
- Culex huangae Meng, 1958 — China
- Culex hutchinsoni Barraud, 1924 — Bangladesh, Cambodia, India, Malaysia, Nepal, Pakistan, Philippines, Singapore, Thailand, Vietnam, Myanmar
- Culex impellens Walker, 1859
- Culex incognitus Baisas, 1938 — Indonesia, Philippines
- Culex inelegans Dyar, 1920
- Culex inflictus Theobald, 1901 — Belize, Colombia, Costa Rica, Cuba, Grenada, Mexico, Panama, Trinidad and Tobago, Venezuela, Lesser Antilles
- Culex infula Theobald, 1901 — Bangladesh, India, Indonesia, Malaysia, Myanmar (Burma, Nepal, Philippines, Sri Lanka, Thailand, Vietnam)
- Culex ingrami Edwards, 1916 — Cameroon, Central African Republic, Congo, Gabon, Ghana, Liberia, Nigeria, Sierra Leone, Uganda, French Guiana, Zaire
- Culex inquisitor Dyar & Knab, 1906
- Culex interfor Dyar, 1928 — Argentina
- Culex interrogator Dyar & Knab, 1906 — El Salvador, Mexico, Nicaragua, Panama, United States
- Culex invidiosus Theobald, 1901 — Cameroon, Gabon, Gambia, Ghana, Kenya, Liberia, Nigeria, Senegal, Sierra Leone, Sudan, Tanzania, Uganda, Zaire
- Culex iyengari Mattingly & Rageau, 1958 — New Caledonia
- Culex jacksoni Edwards, 1934 — China, India, Korea, Nepal, Russia, Sri Lanka, Taiwan
- Culex janitor Theobald, 1903 — Haiti, Jamaica, Puerto Rico
- Culex jepsoni Theobald, 1910
- Culex jubilator Dyar & Knab, 1907
- Culex kangi Lien., 1968
- Culex kelloggii Theobald, 1903
- Culex kesseli Belkin, 1962 — French Polynesia
- Culex kinabaluensis Sirivanakarn, 1976 — Malaysia
- Culex lachrimans Dyar & Knab, 1909
- Culex lahillei Bachmann & Casal, 1962 — Argentina
- Culex lamentator Dyar & Knab, 1906
- Culex lateropunctata Theobald, 1907
- Culex laticinctus Edwards, 1913 — Djibouti, Ethiopia, Greece, Iran, Israel, Jordan, Lebanon, Morocco, Oman, Portugal, Romania, Saudi Arabia, Spain, Sudan, Syria, Turkey, Yemen, French Equatorial Africa
- Culex laticlasper Galindo & Blanton, 1954 — Panama
- Culex laurenti Newstead, 1907, in Newstead, Dutton, & Todd 1907
- Culex lepostenis Dyar, 1923
- Culex levicastilloi Lane, 1945 — Ecuador, Venezuela
- Culex litoralis Bohart, 1946 — Singapore, Mariana Islands
- Culex litwakae Harbach, 1985 — Kenya
- Culex lividocostalis Graham, 1910
- Culex longefurcatus Becker, 1903
- Culex longicornis Sirivanakarn, 1976 — Thailand
- Culex loricatus Leicester, 1908
- Culex luteoannulatus Theobald, 1901
- Culex luteoebdominalis Theobald, 1910
- Culex luteola Theobald, 1910
- Culex luteus Meigen, 1804
- Culex luzonensis Sirivanakarn, 1976 — Philippines
- Culex lygrus Root, 1927 — Brazil
- Culex machadoi Mattos, Guedes & Xavier, 1978 — Brazil
- Culex macleayi Skuse, 1889
- Culex maculipes Theobald, 1904
- Culex madagascariensis Ventrillon, 1905
- Culex major Edwards, 1935
- Culex maracayensis Evans, 1923 — Colombia, Venezuela, Lesser Antilles
- Culex marginalis Stephens, 1825
- Culex marquesensis Stone & Rosen, 1953 — French Polynesia
- Culex masculus Theobald, 1901
- Culex mattinglyi Knight, 1953 — Saudi Arabia, Syria, Yemen
- Culex mauesensis Lane, 1945 — Brazil
- Culex mauritanicus Callot, 1940
- Culex maxi Dyar, 1928 — Argentina, Brazil, Paraguay, Uruguay
- Culex mayumbae Galliard, 1931
- Culex melanorhinus Giles, 1900
- Culex meridionalis Leach, 1825
- Culex microannulata Theobald, 1907
- Culex microannulatus Theobald, 1901
- Culex microsquamosus Theobald, 1905
- Culex milni Taylor, 1914
- Culex mimeticus Noe, 1899 — Bulgaria, China, Greece, India, Iran, Iraq, Israel, Italy, Japan, Jordan, Korea, Lebanon, Malaysia, Morocco, Nepal, Pakistan, Portugal, Russia, Saudi Arabia, Spain, Syria, Turkey, Myanmar, Oriental Region
- Culex mimuloides Barraud, 1924 — China, India
- Culex mimulus Edwards, 1915 — Australia, Bangladesh, China, India, Indonesia, Malaysia, Nepal, Pakistan, Philippines, Singapore, Sri Lanka, Taiwan, Thailand, Vietnam
- Culex minimus Leicester, 1908
- Culex minor Theobald, 1908
- Culex minutus Theobald, 1905
- Culex miraculosus Bonne-Wepster, 1937 — Indonesia
- Culex mirificus Edwards, 1913 — Kenya
- Culex molestus Forskal, 1775 - Brazil
- Culex mollis Dyar & Knab, 1906 — Belize, Brazil, Colombia, Costa Rica, Ecuador, Guyana, Honduras, Mexico, Nicaragua, Panama, Peru, Suriname, Trinidad and Tobago, Venezuela, French Guiana
- Culex montforti Ventrillon, 1905
- Culex mooseri Vargas & Martinez Palacios, 1954
- Culex mortificator Dyar & Knab, 1906
- Culex mossmani Taylor, 1915
- Culex murrelli Lien, 1968 — China, Malaysia, Taiwan, Thailand, Vietnam
- Culex musarum Edwards, 1932 — Kenya, Uganda, Zaire
- Culex nakuruensis Mattingly, 1951 — Kenya
- Culex neavei Theobald, 1906 — Angola, Ethiopia, Gabon, Madagascar, South Africa, Sudan, Tanzania, Uganda, Zaire
- Culex neireti Ventrillon, 1906
- Culex neolitoralis Bram, 1976
- Culex neomimulus Lien., 1968
- Culex neotaeniorhynchus Theobald, 1910
- Culex neovishnui Lien, 1968
- Culex nigricephala Leicester, 1908
- Culex nigriceps Buxton, 1927
- Culex nigripalpus Theobald, 1901 — Barbados, Belize, Brazil, Colombia, Costa Rica, Cuba, Dominican Republic, Ecuador, El Salvador, Guatemala, Guyana, Honduras, Jamaica, Mexico, Nicaragua, Panama, Paraguay, Suriname, Trinidad and Tobago, United States, Venezuela, Antilles
- Culex nigrirostris Enderlein, 1920
- Culex nigrocostalis Theobald, 1909
- Culex nilgiricus Edwards, 1916 — India
- Culex ninagongoensis Edwards, 1928 — Uganda, Zaire
- Culex ocellata Theobald, 1907
- Culex ochrecee Theobald,
- Culex omani Belkin, 1962 — Indonesia, Solomon Islands
- Culex onderstepoortensis Theobald, 1911
- Culex orientalis Edwards, 1921 — China, Japan, Korea, Philippines, Russia, Taiwan
- Culex ornatothoracis Theobald, 1909 — Ghana, Kenya, Uganda
- Culex osakaensis Theobald, 1907
- Culex oswaldoi Forattini, 1965 — Brazil
- Culex ousqua Dyar, 1918 — Belize, Colombia, Costa Rica, El Salvador, Guatemala, Honduras, Mexico, Nicaragua, Panama
- Culex pacificus Edwards, 1916 — Vanuatu
- Culex pajoti Ramos & Ribeiro, 1981 — Angola
- Culex pallidocephala Theobald, 1904
- Culex pallidothoracis Theobald, 1909 — Burkina Faso, Cameroon, Central African Republic, Congo, Gabon, Nigeria, Uganda
- Culex pallipes Waltl, 1835
- Culex palmi Baisas, 1938
- Culex palpalis Taylor, 1912 — Australia, Papua New Guinea
- Culex paludis Taylor, 1913
- Culex palus Theobald, 1903
- Culex par Newstead, 1907
- Culex paramaxi Duret, 1968 — Brazil
- Culex parvus Taylor, 1912
- Culex pavlovsky Shingarev, 1928
- Culex penafieli Sanchez, 1885
- Culex perexiguus Theobald, 1903 — Greece, Iran, Israel, Jordan, Lebanon, Morocco, Saudi Arabia, Sudan, Syria, Turkey
- Culex perfidiosus Edwards, 1914 — Cameroon, Central African Republic, Congo, Gabon, Ghana, Liberia, Madagascar, Nigeria, Zaire
- Culex perfuscus Edwards, 1914 — Cameroon, Ethiopia, Gabon, Ghana, Kenya, Liberia, Malawi, Mozambique, Nigeria, Sierra Leone, South Africa, Zaire, French Equatorial Africa
- Culex permixtus Hsieh & Liao, 1956
- Culex perplexus Leicester, 1908 — India, Indonesia, Malaysia, Papua New Guinea, Philippines, Singapore, Thailand
- Culex pervigilans Von Bergroth, 1889 — New Zealand

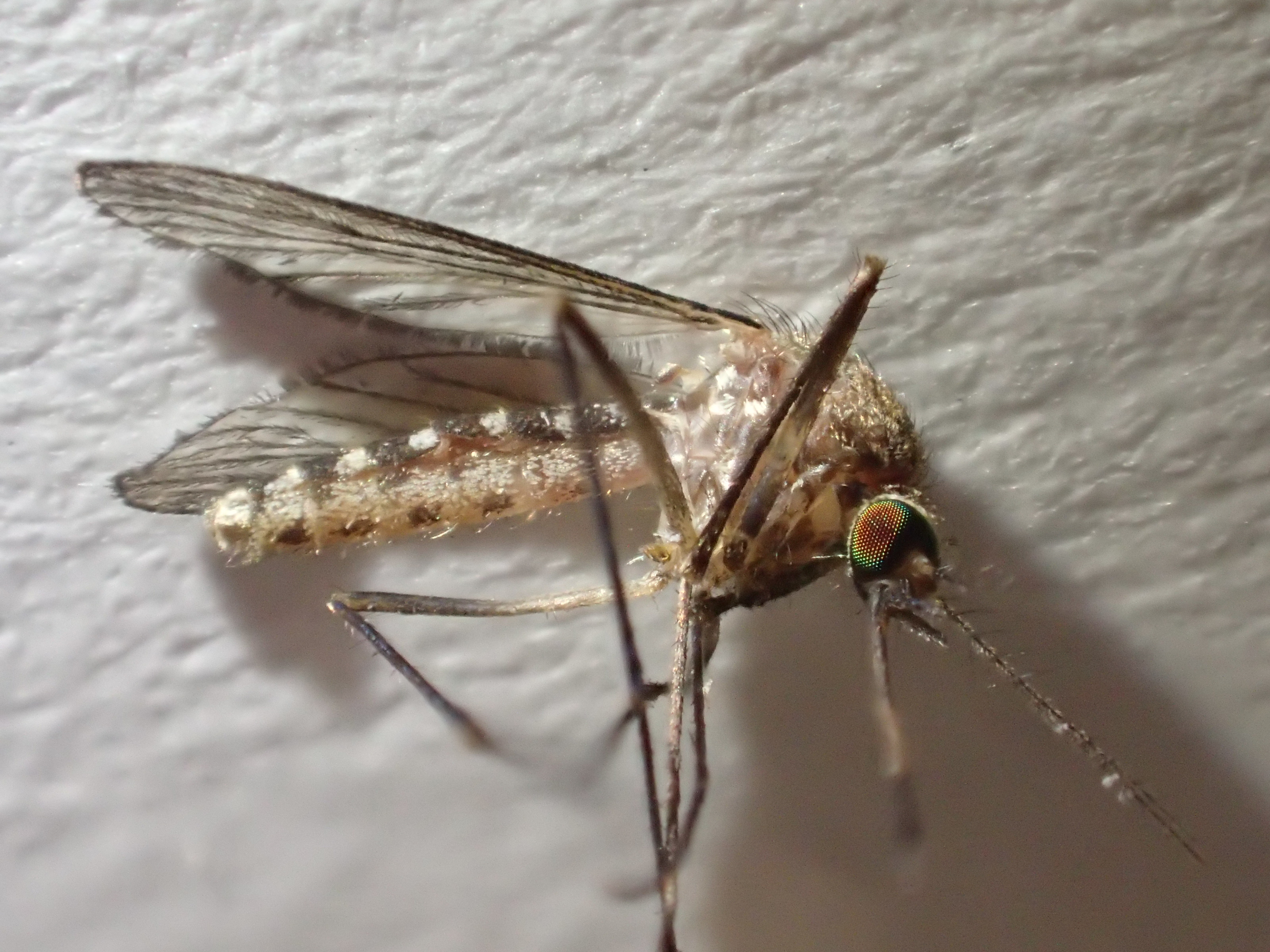
C. pervigilans

- Culex petersoni Dyar, 1920
- Culex pettigrewii Theobald, 1910
- Culex philipi Edwards, 1929 — Cameroon, Gambia, Ghana, Nigeria, Senegal, Sierra Leone
- Culex philippinensis Sirivanakarn, 1976 — Philippines
- Culex phytophagus Ficalbi, 1889
- Culex pinarocampa Dyar & Knab, 1908 — Costa Rica, Mexico, Panama
- Culex pipiens Linnaeus, 1758 — Argentina, Bosnia & Herzegovina, Bulgaria, Canada, Cyprus, Czech Republic, Egypt, France, Germany, Greece, Hungary, Iran, Israel, Italy, Japan, Jordan, Latvia, Lebanon, Luxembourg, Morocco, Pakistan, Poland, Portugal, Romania, Russia, Saudi Arabia, Slovakia, Spain, Sweden, Tajikistan, Tunisia, Turkey, United Kingdom, United States, Uruguay, Yugoslavia (Serbia and Montenegro)
- Culex plegepennis Theobald, 1907
- Culex plicatus Olivares, 1993 — Chile
- Culex poicilipes (Theobald, 1903) — Nigeria
- Culex prasinopleurus Martini, 1914
- Culex proclametor Dyar & Knab, 1906
- Culex propinquus Colless, 1955 — Singapore
- Culex prorimus Dyar & Knab, 1909
- Culex prosecutor Séguy, 1927 — France
- Culex pruina Theobald, 1901 — Cameroon, Central African Republic, Congo, Gabon, Ghana, Liberia, Nigeria, Sierra Leone, Uganda, French Guiana, Zaire
- Culex pseudoannulioris Theobald, 1909 — Gabon, Ghana, Kenya, Liberia, Mozambique, Nigeria, Sierra Leone, Sudan, Tanzania, Uganda, Zaire
- Culex pseudoinfula Theobald, 1911
- Culex pseudojanthinosoma Senevet & Abonnenc, 1946 — French Guiana
- Culex pseudomimeticus Sergent, 1909
- Culex pseudopruina Van Someren, 1951 — Uganda
- Culex pseudosinensis Colless, 1955 — Cambodia, Malaysia, Singapore, Thailand
- Culex pseudostigmatosoma Strickman, 1990 — Honduras
- Culex pseudovishnui Colless, 1957 — Bangladesh, Cambodia, China, India, Indonesia, Iran, Japan, Korea, Laos, Malaysia, Nepal, Pakistan, Philippines, Singapore, Thailand, Vietnam
- Culex pullatus Graham, 1910 — Mali, Nigeria
- Culex punctipes Theobald, 1907
- Culex pungens Wiedemann, 1828
- Culex pygmaeus Neveu-Lemaire, 1906
- Culex quasigelidus Theobald, 1903
- Culex quasiguiarti Theobald, 1910 — Cameroon, Ethiopia, Kenya, Madagascar, Uganda, Zaire
- Culex quasilinealis Theobald, 1907
- Culex quasimodestus Theobald, 1905
- Culex quasipipiens Theobald, 1901
- Culex quasisecutor Theobald, 1907
- Culex quinquefasciatus Say, 1823 — Argentina, Australia, Bahamas, Bangladesh, Brazil, Cambodia, Chile, China, Congo, Cuba, Djibouti, Dominican Republic, Ethiopia, India, Indonesia, Iran, Kiribati, Laos, Madagascar, Malaysia, Maldives, Marshall Islands, Mauritius, Mexico, Micronesia, Federated States of, Nauru, Nepal, New Zealand, Oman, Pakistan, Palau, Papua New Guinea, Peru, Philippines, Samoa, Saudi Arabia, Solomon Islands, South Africa, Sudan, Suriname, Tanzania, Tonga, Trinidad and Tobago, United Kingdom, United States, Uruguay, Vanuatu, Comoros, New Caledonia, Zaire, Equatorial Guinea, Myanmar, Tuvalu, Cook Islands, British Indian Ocean Territory (Chagos)
- Culex quitensis Levi-Castillo, 1953 — Ecuador
- Culex raymondii Tamayo,
- Culex reesi Theobald, 1901
- Culex reflector Dyar & Knab, 1909
- Culex regulator Dyar & Knab, 1906
- Culex renatoi Lane & Ramalho, 1960 — Brazil
- Culex restuans Theobald, 1901 — Canada, Guatemala, Honduras, Mexico, United States
- Culex revelator Dyar & Knab, 1907
- Culex revocator Dyar & Knab, 1909
- Culex richteri Ingram & De Meillon, 1927
- Culex riojanus Duret, 1968 — Argentina
- Culex ronaldi Charmoy,
- Culex roseni Belkin, 1962 — French Polynesia
- Culex rotoruae Belkin, 1968 — New Zealand
- Culex rufinus Bigot, 1888
- Culex rufus Meigen, 1818
- Culex saibaii Taylor, 1912
- Culex salinarius Coquillett, 1904 — Canada, Mexico, United States, Bermuda
- Culex salinus Baisas, 1938
- Culex saltanensis Dyar, 1928 — Argentina, Brazil, Panama, Venezuela
- Culex salus Theobald, 1908
- Culex samoaensis (Theobald, 1914)
- Culex sarawaki Theobald, 1907
- Culex scheuberi Carpintero & Leguizamon, 2004 — Argentina
- Culex scholasticus Theobald, 1901
- Culex schwetzi Edwards, 1929 — Liberia, Zaire
- Culex scimitar Branch & Seabrook, 1959 — Bahamas
- Culex scottii Theobald, 1912 — Seychelles
- Culex scutatus Rozeboom & Komp, 1948
- Culex secutor Theobald, 1901 — Jamaica, Puerto Rico, Lesser Antilles
- Culex selangorensis Sirivanakarn, 1976 — Malaysia
- Culex seldeslachtsi Wolfs, 1947 — Zaire
- Culex sericeus Theobald, 1901
- Culex serotinus Philippi, 1865
- Culex shoae Hamon & Ovazza, 1954 — Ethiopia, Uganda
- Culex siamensis Barraud & Christophers, 1931
- Culex similis Theobald, 1903
- Culex simplex Theobald, 1903
- Culex simpsoni Theobald, 1905 — Djibouti, Kenya, Madagascar, Morocco, Seychelles, South Africa, Sudan, Tanzania, Yemen, Zimbabwe, Comoros, Zaire
- Culex sinaiticus Kirkpatrick, 1924 — Egypt, Eritrea, Iran, Israel, Jordan, Oman, Saudi Arabia, Sudan, Yemen
- Culex sitiens Wiedemann, 1828 — Australia, Bangladesh, Cameroon, China, Djibouti, Fiji, India, Indonesia, Iran, Japan, Kenya, Korea, Madagascar, Malaysia, Maldives, Morocco, Mozambique, Nauru, Oman, Pakistan, Papua New Guinea, Philippines, Samoa, Saudi Arabia, Singapore, Solomon Islands, Sri Lanka, Sudan, Taiwan, Tanzania, Thailand, Tonga, United Arab Emirates, Vanuatu, Yemen, Comoros, New Caledonia, Myanmar, Tuvalu
- Culex skusii Giles, 1900
- Culex solitarius Bonne-Wepster, 1938 — Indonesia
- Culex somaliensis Neveu-Lemaire, 1906
- Culex somerseti Taylor, 1912 — Australia
- Culex sphinx Howard, Dyar, & Knab, 1912 — Bahamas, Cuba
- Culex spinosus Lutz, 1905 — Brazil, Colombia, Venezuela
- Culex squamosus (Taylor, 1914) — Australia, Indonesia, Solomon Islands
- Culex starckeae Stone & Knight, 1958 — Australia, Indonesia, Vanuatu, New Caledonia
- Culex stenolepis Dyar & Knab, 1908 — Costa Rica, Mexico
- Culex sternopallidus Roubaud, 1945
- Culex sternopunctatus Roubaud, 1945
- Culex stigmatosoma Dyar, 1907 — United States
- Culex stoehri Theobald, 1907
- Culex striatipes Edwards, 1941 — Burkina Faso, Ethiopia, Kenya, Zambia, Zimbabwe, Zaire, South Africa
- Culex summorosus Dyar, 1920
- Culex surinamensis Dyar, 1918 — Bolivia, Brazil, Suriname, Venezuela, French Guiana
- Culex taeniarostris Theobald, 1907
- Culex taeniorhynchoides Giles, 1904
- Culex tamsi Edwards, 1934 — São Tomé and Príncipe
- Culex tarsalis Coquillett, 1896 — Canada, Mexico, United States
- Culex tatoi Casal & Garcia, 1971 — Argentina
- Culex taylori Edwards, 1921
- Culex taytayensis Banks, 1909
- Culex tejerai Cova Garcia, 1962
- Culex telesilla de Meillon & Lavoipierre, 1945 — Angola, Cameroon, Liberia, Mozambique, Zaire
- Culex tenagius Van Someren, 1954 — Djibouti, Kenya, Uganda
- Culex tenax Theobald, 1901
- Culex terzii Edwards, 1941 — Ethiopia, Kenya, South Africa, Uganda, Zimbabwe
- Culex thalassius Theobald, 1903 — Angola, Cameroon, Gabon, Gambia, Ghana, Kenya, Liberia, Madagascar, Mauritius, Mozambique, Senegal, South Africa, Syria, Tanzania, Togo, French Guiana, Zaire
- Culex theileri Theobald, 1903 — Afghanistan, Algeria, Bangladesh, Bulgaria, China, Egypt, Greece, India, Iran, Iraq, Israel, Jordan, Kenya, Lebanon, Libya, Mongolia, Morocco, Nepal, Pakistan, Portugal, Romania, Russia, Saudi Arabia, Slovakia, South Africa, Spain, Syria, Tajikistan, Tanzania, Tunisia, Turkey, Zimbabwe
- Culex thoracicus Robineau-Desvoidy, 1827
- Culex thriambus Dyar, 1921 — Colombia, Costa Rica, Dominican Republic, Mexico, Panama, United States
- Culex tianpingensis Chen, 1981 — China
- Culex tipuliformis Theobald, 1901
- Culex tisseuli Senevet, 1937
- Culex tomeri Dyar & Knab, 1907
- Culex toroensis Edwards & Gibbins, 1939 — Cameroon, Kenya, Malawi, South Africa, Sudan, Uganda, Zaire
- Culex torrentium Martini, 1925 — Belgium, Czech Republic, Denmark, Finland, France, Germany, Iran, Luxembourg, Norway, Poland, Portugal, Romania, Russia, Slovakia, Spain, Sweden, Turkey, United Kingdom
- Culex torridus Iglisch., 1977
- Culex toviiensis Klein, Riviere & Sechan, 1983
- Culex townsvillensis Taylor, 1919
- Culex trifilatus Edwards, 1914 — Cameroon, Ethiopia, Gabon, Kenya, Malawi, Mozambique, South Africa, Sudan, Tanzania, Uganda, Zimbabwe, Zaire
- Culex trifoliatus Edwards, 1914 — Ethiopia, Ghana, Kenya, Namibia, South Africa, Sudan, Uganda, Zaire
- Culex trifurcatus Fabricius, 1794
- Culex trilineatus Theobald, 1901
- Culex tritaeniorhynchus Giles, 1901 — Angola, Bangladesh, Cambodia, Cameroon, Central African Republic, China, Djibouti, Egypt, Ethiopia, Gabon, Gambia, Ghana, Greece, India, Indonesia, Iran, Iraq, Israel, Japan, Jordan, Kenya, Korea, Lebanon, Malaysia, Maldives, Mozambique, Nepal, Nigeria, Pakistan, Philippines, Russia, Saudi Arabia, Sri Lanka, Syria, Tanzania, Thailand, Togo, Turkey, Turkmenistan, Vietnam, Myanmar
- Culex tsengi Lien, 1968 — Taiwan
- Culex umbripes Edwards, 1941 — Zaire
- Culex unistriatus Curtis, 1837
- Culex univittatus Theobald, 1901 — Bulgaria, Burkina Faso, Djibouti, Egypt, Ethiopia, Kenya, Madagascar, Niger, Pakistan, Portugal, South Africa, Spain, Yemen, Zimbabwe
- Culex usquatissimus Dyar, 1922 — Colombia, Costa Rica, Ecuador, Guyana, Panama, Venezuela
- Culex usquatus Dyar, 1918 — Argentina, Brazil, Mexico, Panama, Paraguay
- Culex vagans Wiedemann, 1828 — Bangladesh, China, India, Iran, Japan, Korea, Mongolia, Nepal, Pakistan, Russia
- Culex vansomereni Edwards, 1926 — Ethiopia, Kenya, Mozambique, Sudan, Tanzania, Uganda, Zimbabwe, Zaire, South Africa
- Culex varioannulatus Theobald, 1903 — China, Japan, Korea, Mexico, United States
- Culex ventrilloni Edwards, 1920 — Madagascar
- Culex verutus Harbach, 1987 — Sierra Leone
- Culex vicinus (Taylor, 1916) — Australia
- Culex vindicator Dyar & Knab, 1909
- Culex virgatipes Edwards, 1914
- Culex viridis Theobald, 1903 — Ghana, Nigeria
- Culex vishnui Theobald, 1901 — Bangladesh, Cambodia, China, India, Indonesia, Japan, Malaysia, Maldives, Nepal, Philippines, Singapore, Sri Lanka, Taiwan, Thailand, Vietnam, Myanmar, Timor
- Culex watti Edwards, 1920 — Angola, Ghana, Tanzania, Uganda
- Culex weschei Edwards, 1935 — Burkina Faso, Cameroon, Ghana, Mozambique, Senegal, Sudan, Togo, Zaire, Kenya
- Culex whitei Barraud, 1923 — Bangladesh, India, Indonesia, Malaysia, Nepal, Philippines, Thailand, Vietnam
- Culex whitmorei Giles, 1904 — Australia, Bangladesh, China, India, Indonesia, Japan, Korea, Malaysia, Nepal, Pakistan, Philippines, Russia, Sri Lanka, Taiwan, Vietnam
- Culex whittingtoni Belkin, 1962 — Solomon Islands
- Culex willistoni Giles, 1900
- Culex yojoae Strickman, 1990 — Belize, Honduras
- Culex zeltneri Neveu-Lemaire, 1906
- Culex zombaensis Theobald, 1901 — Angola, Ethiopia, Kenya, Malawi, Mozambique, Sudan, Tanzania, Uganda, Zambia, Zaire
- Culex longitubus Somboon, Namgay & Harbach, 2021

== Subgenus Phalangomyia Dyar & Knab, 1914 ==
- Culex apicinus Philippi, 1865 — Bolivia, Chile, Peru

== Subgenus Culiciomyia Theobald ==
- Culex azurini Toma, Miyagi & Cabrera, 1984 — Philippines
- Culex bahri (Edwards, 1914) — Indonesia, Sri Lanka
- Culex bailyi Barraud, 1934 — India, Indonesia, Sri Lanka, Thailand
- Culex barrinus Bram — Thailand
- Culex cambournaci Hamon & Gandara, 1955 — São Tomé and Príncipe
- Culex ceramensis Sirivanakarn & Kurihara, 1973 — Indonesia
- Culex cheni Dong, Wang & Lu, 2003 — China
- Culex cinerellus Edwards, 1922 — Angola, Cameroon, Central African Republic, Congo, Kenya, Liberia, Madagascar, Nigeria, Sierra Leone, South Africa, Sudan, Uganda, Comoros, Zaire
- Culex cinereus Theobald, 1901 — Angola, Burkina Faso, Cameroon, Ghana, Kenya, Liberia, Madagascar, Nigeria, Sierra Leone, South Africa, Sudan, Uganda, Zambia, Zimbabwe, Zaire
- Culex freetownensis Theobald, 1901
- Culex uniformis Theobald, 1909
- Culex delfinadoae Sirivanakarn, 1973 — Philippines
- Culex dispectus Bram, — Thailand
- Culex eouzani Geoffroy, 1971 — Cameroon, Central African Republic
- Culex fragilis Ludlow, 1903 — India, Indonesia, Malaysia, Philippines, Solomon Islands, Sri Lanka, Thailand
- Culex ceylonica Theobald, 1907
- Culex fuscus Theobald, 1905
- Culex graminis Leicester, 1908
- Culex inornata Theobald, 1907
- Culex furlongi Van Someren, 1954 — Kenya
- Culex fuscicinctus King & Hoogstraal, 1946 — Indonesia
- Culex gilliesi Hamon & Van Someren, 1961 — Tanzania
- Culex grenieri Eouzan, 1969 — Cameroon
- Culex hainanensis Chen, 1977 — China
- Culex harleyi Peters, 1955 — Cameroon, Liberia
- Culex harrisoni Sirivanakarn, 1977 — Thailand
- Culex javanensis Bonne-Wepster, 1934 — Indonesia
- Culex kyotoensis Yamaguti & LaCasse, 1952 — Japan, Korea
- Culex lampangensis Sirivanakarn, 1973 — Thailand
- Culex liberiensis Peters, 1955 — Liberia, Zaire
- Culex macfiei Edwards, 1923 — Burkina Faso, Cameroon, Central African Republic, Gabon, Ghana, Liberia, Nigeria, Senegal, Sierra Leone, Sudan, Uganda, Zaire
- Culex maplei Knight & Hurlbut, 1949 — Micronesia, Federated States of
- Culex megaonychus Yang & Li, 1993 — China
- Culex milloti Doucet, 1949 — Madagascar
- Culex mongiro Van Someren, 1951 — Uganda
- Culex muspratti Hamon & Lambrecht, 1959 — Zaire
- Culex nailoni King & Hoogstraal, 1946 — Indonesia
- Culex nebulosus Theobald, 1901 — Ghana, Nigeria, Sierra Leone, Comoros, Ethiopian & Oriental Regions
- Culex freetownensis Theobald, 1901
- Culex fuscus Theobald, 1909
- Culex invenustus Theobald, 1901
- Culex nigrochaetae Theobald, 1901 — Lesotho, Malawi, Namibia, Nigeria, South Africa, Tanzania, Zimbabwe, Zaire
- Culex nigropunctatus Edwards, 1926 — Bangladesh, China, India, Indonesia, Japan, Malaysia, Micronesia, Federated States of, Nepal, Palau, Philippines, Singapore, Sri Lanka, Taiwan, Thailand, Hong Kong
- Culex annulata Theobald, 1907
- Culex pallidothorax Theobald, 1905 — Bangladesh, China, India, Indonesia, Japan, Malaysia, Myanmar (Burma, Nepal, Philippines, Sri Lanka, Taiwan, Thailand, Vietnam, Timor
- Culex albopleura Theobald, 1907
- Culex annuloabdominalis Theobald, 1910
- Culex pandani Brunhes, 1969 — Madagascar
- Culex papuensis (Taylor, 1914) — Indonesia, Malaysia, Papua New Guinea, Philippines, Solomon Islands, Thailand
- Culex pullus Theobald, 1905 — Australia, Bangladesh, Indonesia, Papua New Guinea, Solomon Islands, Timor
- Culex muticus Edwards, 1923
- Culex rajah Tsukamoto, 1989 — Malaysia
- Culex ramakrishnii Wattal & Kalra, 1965 — India
- Culex ramalingami Sirivanakarn, 1973 — Malaysia
- Culex ruthae Peters, 1958 — Papua New Guinea
- Culex ryukyensis Bohart, 1946 — Japan
- Culex sasai Kano, Nitahara, & Awaya, 1954 — Japan, Korea
- Culex scanloni Bram, — Indonesia, Malaysia, Philippines, Thailand
- Culex semibrunneus Edwards, 1927 — Cameroon, Congo, Kenya, Uganda, Zaire
- Culex shebbearei Barraud, 1924 — China, India
- Culex spathifurca (Edwards, 1915) — India, Indonesia, Malaysia, Maldives, Philippines, Singapore, Sri Lanka, Thailand
- Culex stylifurcatus Carter & Wijesundara, 1948
- Culex spiculostylus Chen, 1989 — China
- Culex spiculothorax Bram, — Malaysia, Thailand
- Culex subaequalis Edwards, 1941 — Cameroon, Côte d'Ivoire, Gabon, Kenya, Uganda, Zaire
- Culex termi Thurman, 1955 — Thailand
- Culex thurmanorum Bram, 1967 — Thailand
- Culex tricuspis Edwards, 1930 — Indonesia
- Culex trifidus Edwards, 1926
- Culex viridiventer Giles, 1901 — Bangladesh, China, India, Nepal, Pakistan, Vietnam
- Culex angulatus Theobald, 1901
- Culex longifurcatus Theobald, 1910
- Culex pseudolongifurcatus Theobald, 1910
- Culex yaoi Tung, 1955 — China
- Culex sarpangensis Somboon, Namgay & Harbach, 2024
- Culex apicopilosus Cornel & Mayi, 2020
- Culex lanzaroi Cornel & Mayi, 2020
- Culex pseudosubaequalis Cornel & Mayi, 2020

== Subgenus Eumelanomyia Theobald ==
- Culex acrostichalis Edwards, 1941 — Uganda, Zaire
- Culex adami (Hamon & Mouchet, 1955) — Cameroon
- Culex adersianus Edwards, 1941 — Côte d'Ivoire, Kenya, Tanzania
- Culex albertianus Edwards, 1941 — Kenya, Zaire
- Culex albiventris Edwards, 1922 — Cambodia, Central African Republic, Congo, Ghana, Kenya, Liberia, Sierra Leone, Uganda
- Culex inconspicuosa Theobald, 1909
- Culex amaniensis Van Someren & Hamon, 1964 — Tanzania
- Culex andreanus Edwards, 1927 — Congo, Ghana, Nigeria, Uganda, Zaire
- Culex baisasi Sirivanakarn, 1972 — Philippines
- Culex bokorensis Klein & Sirivanakarn, 1969 — Cambodia
- Culex brenguesi Brunhes & Ravaonjanahary, 1973 — Madagascar
- Culex brevipalpis (Giles, 1902) — Bangladesh, Cambodia, China, India, Indonesia, Malaysia, Nepal, Papua New Guinea, Philippines, Singapore, Sri Lanka, Taiwan, Thailand, Vietnam
- Culex fidelis Dyar, 1920
- Culex longipes Theobald, 1901
- Culex macropus Blanchard, 1905
- Culex uniformis Leicester, 1908
- Culex calabarensis Edwards, 1941 — Nigeria
- Culex campilunati Carter & Wijesundara, 1948 — Sri Lanka
- Culex castor de Meillon & Lavoipierre, 1944 — Zaire
- Culex castrensis Edwards, 1922 — India, Sri Lanka
- Culex nigrescens Theobald, 1907
- Culex cataractarum Edwards, 1923 — Papua New Guinea, Philippines
- Culex tricontus Delfinado, 1966
- Culex chauveti Brunhes & Rambelo, 1968 — Madagascar, Comoros
- Culex femineus Edwards, 1926 — Vanuatu
- Culex fimbriforceps Edwards, 1935 — Cameroon, Uganda, Zaire
- Culex foliatus Brug, 1932 — China, India, Indonesia, Malaysia, Nepal, Philippines, Sri Lanka, Taiwan, Thailand, Vietnam
- Culex chiyutoi Baisas, 1935
- Culex chungkiangensis Chang & Chang., 1974
- Culex shrivastavii Wattal, Kalra, & Krishnan, 1966
- Culex galliardi Edwards, 1941 — Gabon, Gambia, Liberia, Nigeria, Sierra Leone, Zaire
- Culex garioui Bailly-Choumara & Rickenbach, 1966 — Cameroon
- Culex germaini Geoffroy, 1974 — Central African Republic
- Culex gudouensis Chang, Zhao, Hang & Chen, 1975 — China
- Culex hackeri Edwards, 1923 — Malaysia
- Culex hamoni Brunhes, Adam, & Bailly-Choumara, 1967 — Congo
- Culex hayashii Yamada, 1917 — China, Japan, Korea, Russia, Taiwan
- Culex helenae Brunhes Adam, & Bailly-Choumara, 1967 — Cameroon
- Culex hinglungensis Chu, 1957 — Cambodia, China, Philippines, Thailand
- Culex culionicus Delfinado, 1966
- Culex horridus Edwards, 1922 — Angola, Cameroon, Central African Republic, Congo, Ghana, Kenya, Liberia, Madagascar, Mozambique, Nigeria, South Africa, Sudan, Zambia, Zimbabwe, Comoros, Zaire
- Culex fusca Theobald, 1909 — Burkina Faso, Cameroon
- Culex inconspicuosus (Theobald, 1908) — Angola, Burkina Faso, Cameroon, Central African Republic, Congo, Gabon, Gambia, Ghana, Kenya, Liberia, Mali, Mozambique, Nigeria, South Africa, Sudan, Zambia, Zimbabwe, Zaire
- Culex insignis (Carter, 1911) — Burkina Faso, Cameroon, Congo, Ghana, Kenya, Madagascar, Malawi, Mauritius, Mozambique, Sierra Leone, Sudan, Uganda, Zaire
- Culex iphis Barraud, 1924 — India
- Culex jefferyi Sirivanakarn, 1977 — Malaysia
- Culex kanyamwerima Van Someren, 1951 — Uganda
- Culex khazani Edwards, 1922 — India
- Culex kilara Van Someren, 1951 — Uganda
- Culex kingianus Edwards, 1922 — Cameroon, Central African Republic, Côte d'Ivoire, Madagascar, Nigeria, Sudan, Uganda, Zaire
- Culex kiriensis Klein & Sirivanakarn, 1969 — Cambodia, Thailand
- Culex laplantei Hamon, Adam, & Mouchet, 1955 — Cameroon
- Culex latifoliatus Delfinado, 1966 — Philippines
- Culex laureli Baisas, 1935 — Philippines
- Culex macrostylus Sirivanakrn & Ramalingam, 1976 — Malaysia
- Culex malayensis Sirivanakarn, 1972 — Malaysia
- Culex malayi (Leicester, 1908) — Bangladesh, China, India, Indonesia, Malaysia, Maldives, Myanmar (Burma, Nepal, Pakistan, Sri Lanka, Taiwan, Thailand, Vietnam)
- Culex aedes Leicester, 1908
- Culex nigrescens Theobald, 1907
- Culex manusensis Sirivnakarn, 1975 — Papua New Guinea
- Culex megafolius Chen & Dong, 1992 — China
- Culex miaolingensis Chen, 1982 — China
- Culex mijanae Brunhes, Adam, & Bailly-Choumara, 1967 — Cameroon
- Culex mohani Sirivanakarn, 1977 — India
- Culex mundulus Gruenberg, 1905 — Nigeria
- Culex nyangae Galliard, 1931 — Gabon
- Culex okinawae Bohart, 1953 — Japan, Philippines, Taiwan
- Culex lini Lien, 1968
- Culex oresbius Harbach & Rattanarithikul, 1988 — Thailand
- Culex orstom Brunhes, Adam, & Bailly-Choumara, 1967 — Congo
- Culex otachati Klein & Sirivanakarn, 1969 — Cambodia, Thailand
- Culex phangngae Sirivanakarn, 1972 — Thailand
- Culex pluvialis Barraud, 1924 — India, Malaysia, Sri Lanka
- Culex pseudoandreanus Bailly-Choumara, 1965 — Cameroon
- Culex quintetti Brunhes, Adam, & Bailly-Choumara, 1967 — Angola, Côte d'Ivoire
- Culex richardgarciai Jeffery, Oothuman & Rudnick, 1987 — Malaysia
- Culex richei Klein, 1970 — Cambodia
- Culex rima Theobald, 1901 — Burkina Faso, Cameroon, Central African Republic, Gabon, Liberia, Mozambique, Nigeria, Sierra Leone, South Africa, Zaire
- Culex koumbai Galliard, 1931
- Culex rubinotus Theobald, 1906 — Angola, Cameroon, Central African Republic, Congo, Ethiopia, Gabon, Kenya, Mozambique, Senegal, South Africa, Sudan, Tanzania, Uganda, Zambia, Zaire
- Culex selai Klein & Sirivanakarn, 1969 — Cambodia, Malaysia
- Culex simplicicornis Edwards, 1930 — Malaysia
- Culex simpliciforceps Edwards, 1941 — Cameroon, Congo, Côte d'Ivoire, Sudan, Uganda, Zaire
- Culex stellatus Van Someren, 1947 — Seychelles
- Culex subrima Edwards, 1941 — Cameroon, Congo, Liberia, Nigeria, Zaire
- Culex sunyaniensis Edwards, 1941 — Cameroon, Gabon, Gambia, Ghana, Liberia, Mozambique, Nigeria, Senegal, Sierra Leone, Sudan
- Culex tauffliebi Geoffroy & Herve, 1976 — Central African Republic
- Culex tenuipalpis Barraud, 1924 — India, Indonesia, Malaysia, Thailand
- Culex uncinatus Delfinado, 1966 — Philippines
- Culex vattieri Geoffroy, 1971 — Central African Republic
- Culex vinckei Hamon, Holstein, & Rivola, 1957 — Côte d'Ivoire, Zaire
- Culex wansoni Wolfs, 1945 — Zaire
- Culex wigglesworthi Edwards, 1941 — Burkina Faso, Cameroon, Ghana, Kenya, Nigeria, Sierra Leone, Sudan, Uganda, Comoros, Zaire
- Culex yeageri Baisas, 1935 — Philippines

== Subgenus Kitzmilleria Danilov ==
- Culex moucheti Evans, 1923 — Cameroon, Kenya, Liberia, Nigeria, Sudan, Uganda, Zaire

== Subgenus Lasiosiphon KirkPatrick ==
- Culex adairi Kirkpatrick, 1926 — Egypt, Israel, French Equatorial Africa
- Culex kirkpatricki Stackelberg, 1927
- Culex kirkpatriki Edwards, 1926
- Culex pluvialis Kirkpatrick, 1924

== Subgenus Lophoceraomyia Theobald ==
- Culex singhbhumensis Natarajan & Rajavel, 2009
- Culex aculeatus Colless, 1965 — Malaysia, Thailand
- Culex acutipalus Colless, 1965 — Malaysia, Singapore
- Culex aestivus Sirivanakarn, 1977 — Malaysia
- Culex alorensis Sirivanakarn, 1977 — Indonesia, Timor
- Culex alphus Colless, 1965 — Malaysia, Singapore, Thailand
- Culex atracus Colless, 1960 — Solomon Islands
- Culex franclemonti Belkin, 1962
- Culex bandoengensis Brug, 1939 — Indonesia, Malaysia
- Culex becki Belkin, 1962 — Solomon Islands
- Culex bengalensis Barraud, 1934 — China, India, Indonesia, Malaysia, Thailand
- Culex bergi Belkin, 1962 — Solomon Islands
- Culex bicornutus Theobald, — China, India, Japan, Malaysia, Myanmar (Burma, Sri Lanka, Thailand, Vietnam)
- Culex bolii Sirivanakarn, 1968 — Papua New Guinea
- Culex brevipalpus (Theobald, 1905) — Malaysia, Singapore
- Culex buxtoni Edwards, 1926 — Vanuatu
- Culex carolinensis Bohart & Ingram, 1946 — Micronesia, Federated States of
- Culex castaneus Sirivanakarn, 1973 — Papua New Guinea
- Culex christiani Colless, 1960 — Indonesia
- Culex cinctellus Edwards, 1922 — China, India, Indonesia, Japan, Malaysia, Philippines, Singapore, Thailand, Vietnam
- Culex taeniata Leicester, 1908
- Culex coerulescens Edwards, 1928 — Malaysia, Singapore
- Culex collessi Sirivanakarn, 1968 — Papua New Guinea
- Culex cottlei Sirivanakarn, 1968 — Papua New Guinea
- Culex crassicomus Colless, 1965 — Malaysia
- Culex crowei Sirivanakarn, 1968 — Papua New Guinea
- Culex cubiculi Marks, — Australia
- Culex annulata Taylor, 1916
- Culex cubitatus Colless, 1965 — Indonesia, Malaysia, Philippines, Singapore
- Culex curtipalpis (Edwards, 1914) — Indonesia, Malaysia, Singapore, Thailand
- Culex cylindricus Theobald, 1903 — Australia, Papua New Guinea
- Culex demissus Colless, 1965 — Malaysia, Thailand
- Culex fuscosiphonis Bram & Rattanarithikul, 1967
- Culex digoelensis Brug, 1932 — Indonesia
- Culex caeruleus King & Hoogstraal, 1947
- Culex durhami Sirivanakarn, 1968 — Papua New Guinea
- Culex eminentia (Leicester, 1908) — Malaysia, Singapore
- Culex eukrines Bram & Rattanarithikul, 1967 — Thailand
- Culex flavicornis Barraud, 1924 — India
- Culex fraudatrix (Theobald, 1905) — Australia, Indonesia
- Culex fulleri (Ludlow, 1909) — Philippines
- Culex gagnei Evenhuis, 1989 — Indonesia, Papua New Guinea
- Culex ornatus (Theobald, 1905)
- Culex ganapathi Colless, 1965 — Malaysia, Thailand
- Culex gibbulus Delfinado, 1966 — Philippines
- Culex gossi Bohart, 1956 — Micronesia, Federated States of
- Culex gracicornis Sirivanakarn, 1977 — Malaysia, Thailand
- Culex gressitti Sirivanakarn, 1968 — Papua New Guinea
- Culex harpagophallus Wang & Feng, 1964 — China
- Culex hewitti (Edwards, 1914) — Indonesia, Malaysia, Singapore
- Culex hilli Edwards, 1922 — Australia
- Culex australis Taylor, 1915
- Culex hirtipalpis Sirivanakarn, 1977 — Thailand
- Culex hurlbuti Belkin, 1962 — Papua New Guinea, Solomon Islands
- Culex imposter Sirivanakarn, 1977 — Malaysia
- Culex incomptus Bram & Rattanarithikul, 1967 — Thailand
- Culex inculus Colless, 1965 — Cambodia, Indonesia, Malaysia
- Culex infantulus Edwards, 1922 — China, India, Indonesia, Japan, Korea, Malaysia, Maldives, Myanmar (Burma, Nepal, Philippines, Sri Lanka, Thailand, Vietnam)
- Culex parainfantulus Menon, 1944
- Culex insequens Marks, 1989 — Australia
- Culex cairnsensis Taylor, 1919
- Culex insularis Sirivanakarn, 1968 — Papua New Guinea
- Culex jenseni (De Meijere, 1910) — China, India, Indonesia, Japan, Malaysia, Maldives, Myanmar (Burma, Nepal, Philippines, Sri Lanka, Thailand, Vietnam)
- Culex josephineae Baisas, 1935 — Philippines
- Culex kaviengensis Sirivanakarn, 1968 — Papua New Guinea
- Culex kowiroensis Sirivanakarn, 1968 — Papua New Guinea
- Culex kuhnsi King & Hoogstraal, 1955 — Indonesia, Malaysia, Philippines
- Culex mercedesae Baisas, 1974
- Culex kusaiensis Bohart, 1956 — Micronesia, Federated States of
- Culex laffooni Belkin, 1962 — Solomon Islands
- Culex lairdi Belkin, 1962 — Solomon Islands
- Culex lakei Sirivanakarn, 1968 — Papua New Guinea
- Culex lasiopalpis Sirivanakarn, 1977 — Sri Lanka
- Culex lavatae Stone & Bohart, 1944 — Malaysia, Philippines
- Culex leei King & Hoogstraal, 1955 — Indonesia
- Culex lucaris Colless, 1965 — Malaysia, Singapore, Thailand
- Culex macdonaldi Colless, 1965 — India, Indonesia, Malaysia, Philippines, Singapore, Thailand, Vietnam
- Culex mammilifer (Leicester, 1908) — China, India, Indonesia, Malaysia, Philippines, Sri Lanka, Thailand
- Culex chiungchungensis Hsu, 1963
- Culex marksae King & Hoogstraal, 1955 — Indonesia
- Culex minjensis Sirivanakarn, 1968 — Papua New Guinea
- Culex minor (Leicester, 1908) — China, India, Indonesia, Malaysia, Philippines, Thailand
- Culex nolledoi Baisas, 1935
- Culex plantaginis Barraud., 1924
- Culex minutissimus (Theobald, 1907) — Bangladesh, India, Indonesia, Malaysia, Maldives, Pakistan, Sri Lanka, Thailand
- Culex juxtapallidiceps Theobald, 1910
- Culex nigerrima Theobald, 1910
- Culex muruae Sirivanakarn, 1968 — Papua New Guinea
- Culex navalis Edwards, 1926 — Indonesia, Malaysia, Singapore
- Culex niger (Leicester, 1908) — Malaysia
- Culex atratulus Edwards, 1922
- Culex orbostiensis Dobrotworsky, 1957 — Australia
- Culex oweni Belkin, 1962 — Solomon Islands
- Culex pairoji Sirivanakarn, 1977 — Indonesia, Malaysia, Singapore, Thailand
- Culex paraculeatus Sirivanakarn, 1977 — Malaysia, Philippines
- Culex perryi Belkin, 1962 — Solomon Islands
- Culex petersi Colless, 1960 — Indonesia, Papua New Guinea
- Culex peytoni Bram & Rattanarithikul, 1967 — India, Indonesia, Malaysia, Thailand, Vietnam
- Culex pholeter Bram & Rattanarithikul, 1967 — Thailand
- Culex pilifemoralis Wang & Feng, 1964 — China, Thailand
- Culex pseudornatus Colless, 1960 — Papua New Guinea
- Culex pseudorubithoracis Sirivanakarn, 1968 — Papua New Guinea
- Culex quadripalpis (Edwards, 1914) — India, Indonesia, Malaysia, Philippines, Singapore, Sri Lanka, Thailand, Vietnam
- Culex pachecoi Baisas., 1935
- Culex roubaudi Borel, 1926
- Culex sylvestris Leicester, 1908
- Culex raghavanii Rahman, Chowdhury, & Kalra, 1968 — India
- Culex rajaneeae Sirivanakarn, 1968 — Papua New Guinea
- Culex reidi Colless, 1965 — Indonesia, Malaysia, Philippines, Singapore, Thailand
- Culex rubithoracis (Leicester, 1908) — Cambodia, China, India, Indonesia, Japan, Malaysia, Philippines, Singapore, Sri Lanka, Taiwan, Thailand, Vietnam
- Culex sangenluoensis Wang, 1984 — China
- Culex schilfgaardei Sirivanakarn, 1968 — Papua New Guinea
- Culex sedlacekae Sirivanakarn, 1968 — Papua New Guinea
- Culex seniori Barraud, 1934 — India
- Culex shanahani Sirivanakarn, 1968 — Indonesia, Papua New Guinea
- Culex singuawaensis Sirivanakarn, 1969 — Papua New Guinea
- Culex confusus Sirivanakarn, 1968
- Culex solomonis Edwards, 1929 — Solomon Islands
- Culex spiculosus Bram & Rattanarithikul, 1967 — Indonesia, Malaysia, Myanmar (Burma, Taiwan, Thailand)
- Culex hui Lien, 1968
- Culex steffani Sirivanakarn, 1968 — Papua New Guinea
- Culex submarginalis Sirivanakarn, 1973 — Papua New Guinea
- Culex sumatranus Brug, 1931 — Cambodia, China, Indonesia, Vietnam
- Culex szemaoensis Wang & Feng, 1964 — China
- Culex traubi Colless, 1965 — Indonesia, Malaysia, Thailand
- Culex tuberis Bohart, 1946 — Japan
- Culex uniformis (Theobald, 1905) — India, Philippines, Sri Lanka
- Culex variatus (Leicester, 1908) — China, India, Indonesia, Malaysia, Singapore, Thailand, Vietnam
- Culex versabilis Sirivanakarn, 1968 — Papua New Guinea
- Culex walukasi Belkin, 1962 — Solomon Islands
- Culex wamanguae Sirivanakarn, 1968 — Papua New Guinea
- Culex wardi Sirivanakarn, 1977 — Sri Lanka
- Culex whartoni Colless, 1965 — Indonesia, Malaysia, Singapore, Thailand
- Culex wilfredi Colless, 1965 — Malaysia, Thailand, Vietnam
- Culex winkleri Belkin, 1962 — Solomon Islands

== Subgenus Maillotia Theobald ==
- Culex amboannulatus Theobald, 1913
- Culex arbieeni Salem, 1938 — Algeria, Egypt, Iran, Sudan, Yemen, French Equatorial Africa
- Culex avianus de Meillon, 1943 — South Africa
- Culex bostocki Theobald, 1905
- Culex deserticola Kirkpatrick, 1924 — Algeria, Egypt, Iran, Israel, Jordan, Morocco, Spain, Syria, Tunisia, Turkey, French Equatorial Africa
- Culex hortensis Ficalbi, 1889 — Bulgaria, Czech Republic, Greece, India, Iran, Iraq, Italy, Morocco, Portugal, Romania, Russia, Slovakia, Spain, Tajikistan, Turkey
- Culex jenkinsi Knight, 1953
- Culex lavieri Larrousse, 1925
- Culex naudeanus Muspratt., 1961 — South Africa
- Culex peringueyi Edwards, 1924 — South Africa
- Culex pilifera Theobald, 1907 — Portugal
- Culex quettensis Mattingly, 1955 — Pakistan
- Culex robici Doucet, 1950
- Culex salisburiensis Theobald, 1901 — Kenya, Lesotho, Madagascar, South Africa, Sudan, Uganda, Yemen, Zambia, Zimbabwe, Zaire
- Culex seyrigi Edwards, 1941 — Madagascar
- Culex subsalisburiensis Herve & Geoffroy, 1974 — Central African Republic

== Subgenus Melanoconion Theobald ==
- Culex abominator Dyar & Knab, 1909 — United States
- Culex abonnenci Clastrier, 1970 — French Guiana
- Culex adamesi Sirivanakarn & Galindo, 1980 — Brazil, Colombia, Ecuador, Panama, French Guiana
- Culex advieri Senevet, 1938
- Culex agitator Dyar & Knab,
- Culex albinensis Bonne-Wepster & Bonne, 1919 — Argentina, Brazil, Colombia, Panama, Paraguay, Suriname, Venezuela, French Guiana
- Culex alcocki Bonne-Wepster & Bonne, 1919 — Suriname, French Guiana
- Culex alfaroi Dyar, 1921
- Culex aliciae Duret, 1953 — Argentina, Bolivia, Brazil, Paraguay
- Culex alinkios Sallum & Hutchings, 2003 — Brazil
- Culex alogistus Dyar, 1918 — Brazil, Colombia, Costa Rica, Panama, Suriname, Venezuela, French Guiana
- Culex alvarezi Sutil Oramas, Pulido Florenzano & Amarista Meneses, 1987 — Venezuela
- Culex amitis Komp, 1936 — Venezuela
- Culex andricus Root, 1927 — Brazil
- Culex aneles Dyar & Ludlow, 1922
- Culex angularis Sá & Sallum, 2022
- Culex anips Dyar, 1916 — Mexico, United States
- Culex annulipes Theobald, 1907
- Culex anoplicitus Forattini & Sallum, 1989 — Brazil
- Culex apeteticus Howard, Dyar, & Knab, 1912
- Culex aphyllus Talaga, 2020
- Culex arboricola Galindo & Mendez, 1961 — Panama
- Culex atratus Theobald, 1901 — Bahamas, Barbados, Brazil, Cuba, Dominican Republic, Guyana, Haiti, Jamaica, Panama, Saint Lucia, Suriname, Trinidad and Tobago, United States, Puerto Rico, Cayman Islands, Virgin Islands, Guadeloupe, Montserrat, Dominica, Martinique
- Culex aureonotatus Duret & Barreto, 1956 — Brazil
- Culex aurilatus Senevet & Abonnenc, 1939
- Culex bahiensis Duret, 1969 — Brazil
- Culex bastagarius Dyar & Knab, 1906 — Argentina, Brazil, Colombia, Costa Rica, Ecuador, El Salvador, Guatemala, Mexico, Nicaragua, Panama, Paraguay, Peru, Suriname, Trinidad and Tobago, Venezuela, French Guiana, Guadeloupe
- Culex batesi Rozeboom & Komp, 1948 — Colombia, Costa Rica, Ecuador, French Guiana
- Culex bejaranoi Duret, 1953 — Argentina
- Culex bequaerti Dyar & Shannon, 1925 — Brazil
- Culex bhutanensis Somboon, Namgay & Harbach, 2021
- Culex bibulus Dyar, 1920
- Culex bifoliatus Duret & Baretto, 1956 — Brazil
- Culex bilobatus Galindo & Blanton, 1954
- Culex bonneti Senevet, 1938
- Culex borinqueni Root, 1922
- Culex carcinophilus Dyar & Knab, 1906 — Cuba, Dominican Republic, Guatemala, Haiti, Puerto Rico
- Culex caribeanus Galindo & Blanton, 1954 — Brazil, Panama
- Culex carincii Talaga & Duchemin, 2025
- Culex caudatus Clastrier, 1970 — Brazil, French Guiana
- Culex caudelli (Dyar & Knab, 1906) — Brazil, Colombia, Guyana, Panama, Peru, Suriname, Trinidad and Tobago, Venezuela, French Guiana
- Culex cavernicola Floch & Abonnenc, 1945
- Culex cayennensis Floch & Abonnenc, 1945
- Culex cedecei Stone & Hair, 1968 — United States
- Culex cenus Root, 1927
- Culex changuinolae Galindo & Blanton, 1954 — Panama
- Culex chrysonotum Dyar & Knab, 1908
- Culex clarki Evans, 1924 — Argentina, Brazil, Paraguay, Uruguay, Venezuela
- Culex colombiensis Dyar, 1924
- Culex columnaris Sá & Hutchings, 2020 — Brazil
- Culex comatus Senevet & Abonnenc, 1939 — Brazil, Colombia, French Guiana
- Culex commevynensis Bonne-Wepster & Bonne, 1919 — Belize, Colombia, Panama, Suriname, French Guiana
- Culex comminutor Dyar, 1920 — Brazil, Colombia, Ecuador, Suriname, Trinidad and Tobago, French Guiana
- Culex comptus Sá & Sallum, 2020
- Culex confundior Komp & Rozeboom, 1951 — Suriname
- Culex conspirator Dyar & Knab, 1906 — Belize, Colombia, Costa Rica, Ecuador, El Salvador, Guatemala, Honduras, Mexico, Nicaragua, Panama, Trinidad and Tobago, Venezuela
- Culex contei Duret, 1968 — Brazil, Panama, Trinidad and Tobago, French Guiana
- Culex coppenamensis Bonne-Wepster & Bonne, 1919 — Colombia, Suriname, Venezuela, French Guiana
- Culex corentynensis Dyar, 1920 — Suriname, French Guiana
- Culex creole Anduze, 1948 — Brazil, Colombia, Venezuela, French Guiana
- Culex cristovaoi Duret, 1968 — Brazil, French Guiana
- Culex crybda Dyar, 1924 — Brazil, Colombia, Panama, Trinidad and Tobago, Venezuela
- Culex cubensis Dyar & Knab, 1906
- Culex cuclyx Dyar & Shannon, 1924
- Culex curopinensis Bonne-Wepster & Bonne, 1919
- Culex curryi Dyar, 1926
- Culex deceptor Dyar & Knab, 1909
- Culex degustator Dyar, 1921
- Culex delpontei Duret, 1969 — Argentina, Brazil, Paraguay
- Culex diamphidius Peyton & Harbach, 1991 — Mexico
- Culex distinguendus Dyar, 1928 — Brazil, Colombia, Costa Rica, Ecuador, Panama, Peru, French Guiana
- Culex dolichophyllus Clastrier, 1970 — French Guiana
- Culex dornarum Dyar & Shannon, 1924
- Culex dunni Dyar, 1918 — Belize, Brazil, Colombia, Costa Rica, Ecuador, Mexico, Nicaragua, Panama, Paraguay, Suriname, Trinidad and Tobago, Venezuela, French Guiana
- Culex dureti Casal & Garcia, 1968 — Argentina, Brazil, Paraguay, Venezuela
- Culex dyius Root, 1927 — Brazil, French Guiana
- Culex dysmathes Dyar & Ludlow, 1921
- Culex eastor Dyar, 1920 — Brazil, Colombia, Ecuador, Guatemala, Mexico, Panama, Peru, Suriname, Trinidad and Tobago, French Guiana
- Culex educator Dyar & Knab, — Argentina, Belize, Bolivia, Brazil, Colombia, Costa Rica, Ecuador, El Salvador, Guatemala, Honduras, Mexico, Nicaragua, Panama, Peru, Suriname, Venezuela, French Guiana
- Culex egberti Dyar & Knab, 1907
- Culex egcymon Dyar, 1923 — Colombia, Costa Rica, Panama
- Culex eknomios Foratini & Sallum, 1992 — Brazil, Ecuador
- Culex elephas Komp, 1936 — Panama, Venezuela
- Culex elevator Dyar & Knab, 1906 — Argentina, Belize, Brazil, Colombia, Costa Rica, Ecuador, El Salvador, Guatemala, Honduras, Mexico, Nicaragua, Panama, United States, Venezuela, Puerto Rico, French Guiana, Guadeloupe, Dominica
- Culex ensiformis Bonne-Wepster & Bonne, 1919 — Belize, Bolivia, Suriname, French Guiana
- Culex epanatasis Dyar, 1922 — Nicaragua, Panama, French Guiana
- Culex equinoxialis Floch & Abonnenc, 1945 — French Guiana
- Culex ernanii Duret, 1968 — Brazil
- Culex ernsti Anduze, 1948 — Venezuela
- Culex erraticus (Dyar & Knab, 1906) — Belize, Brazil, Colombia, Costa Rica, Cuba, Dominican Republic, Ecuador, El Salvador, Guatemala, Guyana, Haiti, Honduras, Jamaica, Mexico, Nicaragua, Panama, Paraguay, Peru, Suriname, Trinidad and Tobago, United States, Venezuela, Puerto Rico, French Guiana, Virgin Islands, Netherlands Antilles
- Culex evansae Root, 1927 — Brazil, Ecuador, Panama, Trinidad and Tobago, French Guiana
- Culex exedrus Root, 1927
- Culex extenuatus Talaga & Duchemin, 2025
- Culex fairchildi Galindo & Blanton, 1954 — Panama, Venezuela
- Culex falsificator Dyar & Knab, 1909
- Culex fatuator Dyar & Shannon, 1924
- Culex faurani Duret, 1968 — Brazil, French Guiana
- Culex ferreri Duret, 1968 — Colombia, Venezuela
- Culex flabellifer Komp, 1936 — Belize, Guatemala, Honduras, Mexico, Panama, Venezuela, French Guiana
- Culex floridanus Dyar & Knab, 1906
- Culex foliafer Komp & Rozeboom, 1951 — Panama, Suriname, French Guiana
- Culex fur Dyar & Knab, 1907
- Culex galindoi Komp & Rozeboom, 1951 — Panama
- Culex galvaoi Duret, 1968 — Brazil
- Culex garcesi Duret, 1968 — Colombia, Costa Rica
- Culex glyptosalpinx Harbach, Peyton & Harrison, 1984 — Argentina, Bolivia, Brazil, Paraguay
- Culex gnomatos Sallum, Hutchings, Leila & Ferreira, 1997 — Brazil, Peru
- Culex gordoni Evans, 1924
- Culex guedesi da Silva Mattos & Xavier, 1991 — Brazil
- Culex haynei Komp & Curry, 1932
- Culex herrerai Sutil Oramas, Pulido Florenzano & Amarista Meneses, 1987 — Venezuela
- Culex hesitator Dyar & Knab, 1907
- Culex holoneus Dyar, 1921
- Culex homoepas Dyar & Ludlow, 1921
- Culex idottus Dyar, 1920 — Argentina, Bolivia, Brazil, Grenada, Paraguay, Saint Lucia, Suriname, Trinidad and Tobago, Venezuela, French Guiana, Guadeloupe, Dominica, Martinique
- Culex ignobilis Dyar & Knab, 1909
- Culex implicatus Senevet & Abonnenc, 1939
- Culex inadmirabilis Dyar, 1928 — Brazil, French Guiana
- Culex incriminator Dyar & Knab, 1909
- Culex indecorabilis (Theobald, 1903) — Brazil
- Culex inducens Root, 1928
- Culex inextricabilis Talaga, 2020
- Culex inhibitator Dyar & Knab, 1906 — Colombia, Costa Rica, Dominican Republic, El Salvador, Guatemala, Jamaica, Mexico, Panama, Suriname, Venezuela, Puerto Rico, French Guiana
- Culex innominatus Evans, 1924
- Culex innovator Evans, 1924 — Brazil, French Guiana
- Culex intonsus Galindo & Blanton, 1954 — Honduras
- Culex intrincatus Brethes, 1916 — Argentina, Brazil, Paraguay, Peru, Suriname
- Culex investigator Dyar & Knab, 1906
- Culex invocator Pazos, 1908 — Cuba
- Culex iolambdis Dyar, 1918 — Belize, Colombia, Guatemala, Jamaica, Mexico, Panama, United States, Puerto Rico
- Culex isabelae Duret, 1968 — Brazil, Peru
- Culex jamaicensis Grabham, 1906
- Culex jocasta Komp & Rozeboom, 1951 — Grenada
- Culex johnnyi Duret, 1968 — Brazil
- Culex johnsoni Galindo & Mendez, 1961 — Colombia, Panama
- Culex jonistes Dyar, 1920
- Culex jubifer Komp & Brown, 1935 — Brazil, Panama, Venezuela, French Guiana
- Culex kazanjii Talaga, 2020
- Culex keenani Galindo & Mendez, 1961 — Panama
- Culex kerri Duret., 1968
- Culex kummi Komp & Rozeboom, 1951 — Colombia, Nicaragua, Panama
- Culex lacertosus Komp & Rozeboom, 1951 — Panama, French Guiana
- Culex leprincei Dyar & Knab, 1907
- Culex ligator Dyar, 1924
- Culex limacifer Komp, 1936 — Belize, Costa Rica, El Salvador, Mexico, Panama
- Culex longisetosus Sá & Sallum, 2020
- Culex longistriatus Sá & Hutchings, 2022
- Culex longistylus Sá & Sallum, 2020
- Culex lopesi Sirivanakarn & Jakob, 1979 — Brazil
- Culex loturus Dyar, 1925
- Culex lucifugus Komp, 1936 — Argentina, Colombia, Ecuador, Trinidad and Tobago, Venezuela
- Culex macaronensis Dyar & Nunez Tovar, 1926
- Culex madininensis Senevet, 1936 — Saint Kitts & Nevis, Saint Lucia, Guadeloupe, Montserrat, Dominica, Martinique
- Culex manaosensis Evans, 1924
- Culex maroniensis Bonne-Wepster & Bonne, 1919
- Culex martinezi Casal & Garcia, 1968 — Argentina
- Culex mastigia Howard, Dyar, & Knab, 1912
- Culex maxinocca Dyar, 1920 — Suriname, French Guiana
- Culex megapus Root, 1927
- Culex menytes Dyar, 1918
- Culex merodaemon Dyar, 1921
- Culex meroneus Dyar, 1925
- Culex mesodenticulatus Galindo & Mendez, 1961 — Panama
- Culex milwardi Xavier & Da Silva Mattos, 1972 — Brazil
- Culex misionensis Duret, 1953 — Argentina, Brazil
- Culex mistura Komp & Rozeboom, 1951 — Brazil, Colombia, Panama, Venezuela, French Guiana
- Culex moorei Dyar, 1918
- Culex mulrennani Basham, 1948 — Bahamas, Cuba, United States, Cayman Islands
- Culex multispinosus Bonne-Wepster & Bonne, 1920
- Culex mutator Dyar & Knab, 1906 — Belize, Costa Rica, El Salvador, Mexico, Panama
- Culex nicceriensis Bonne-Wepster & Bonne, 1919 — Suriname, Venezuela
- Culex ocossa Dyar & Knab, 1919 — Argentina, Brazil, Colombia, Ecuador, Guyana, Panama, Peru, Suriname, Venezuela
- Culex oedipus Root, 1927 — Argentina, Brazil, Ecuador, Panama
- Culex olimpioi Xavier, Da Silva, & Da Silva Mattos, 1970 — Brazil, Peru
- Culex orfilai Duret, 1953 — Argentina
- Culex organaboensis Talaga & Duchemin, 2023
- Culex palaciosi Duret, 1968 — Brazil, French Guiana
- Culex panocossa Dyar, 1923 — Belize, Colombia, Costa Rica, El Salvador, Guatemala, Jamaica, Mexico, Panama, Venezuela
- Culex paracrybda Komp, 1936 — Guatemala, Panama, Suriname
- Culex pasadaemon Dyar, 1921
- Culex patientiae Floch & Fauran, 1955 — French Guiana
- Culex pavlovskyi Casal & Garcia, 1967 — Argentina
- Culex peccator Dyar & Knab, 1909 — Cuba, Mexico, United States, Puerto Rico

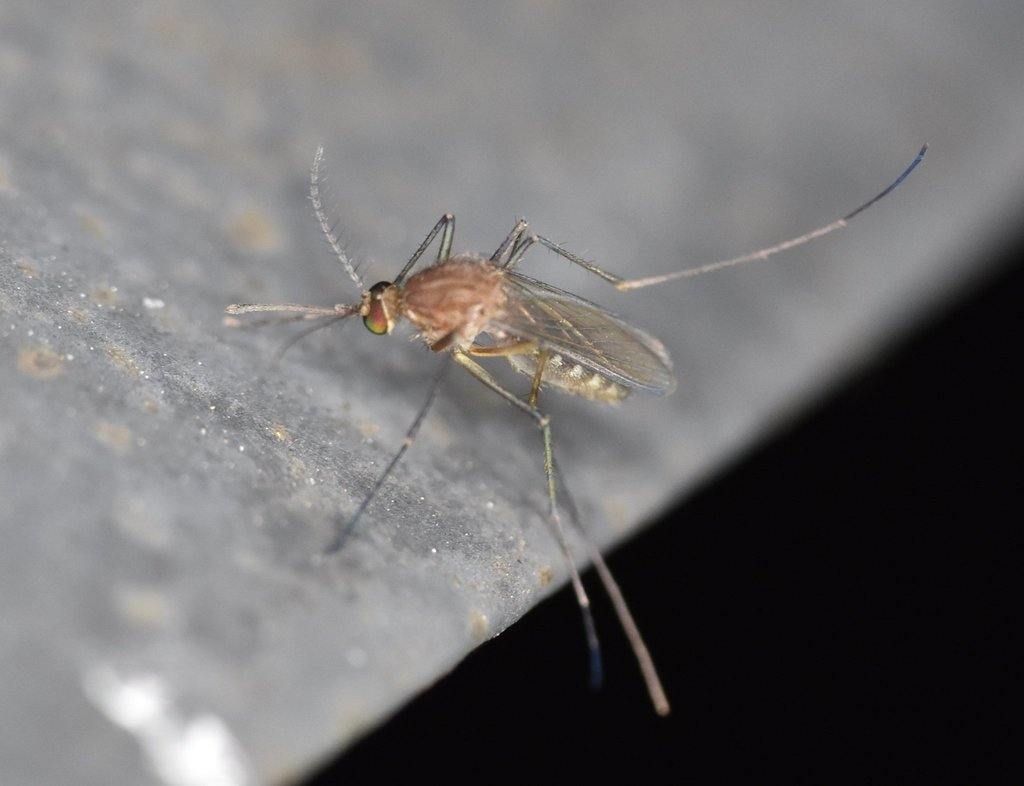
C. peccator

- Culex pedroi Sirivanakarn & Belkin, 1980 — Argentina, Brazil, Colombia, Costa Rica, Ecuador, Guatemala, Guyana, Mexico, Panama, Peru, Suriname, Trinidad and Tobago, Venezuela, French Guiana
- Culex penai Sirivanakarn, 1979 — Bolivia, Ecuador
- Culex pereyrai Duret, 1967 — Brazil, Paraguay
- Culex peribleptus Dyar & Knab, 1917
- Culex phlabistus Dyar, 1920 — Brazil, Suriname, French Guiana
- Culex phlogistus Dyar, 1920 — Brazil, Colombia, Panama, Suriname, Venezuela, French Guiana
- Culex phyllados Hutchings & Sallum, 2008
- Culex pifanoi Anduze, 1948 — Venezuela
- Culex pilosus (Dyar & Knab, 1906) — Argentina, Bahamas, Belize, Bolivia, Brazil, Colombia, Costa Rica, Cuba, Dominican Republic, Ecuador, El Salvador, Guatemala, Honduras, Jamaica, Mexico, Nicaragua, Panama, Paraguay, Peru, Suriname, Trinidad and Tobago, United States, Venezuela, Puerto Rico, French Guiana
- Culex plectoporpe Root, 1927 — Brazil, Panama, French Guiana
- Culex portesi Senevet & Abonnenc, 1941 — Brazil, Peru, Suriname, Trinidad and Tobago, Venezuela, French Guiana
- Culex pose Dyar & Knab, 1917
- Culex productus Senevet & Abonnenc, 1939 — Brazil, French Guiana
- Culex psatharus Dyar, 1920 — Costa Rica, Ecuador, Panama
- Culex pseudotaeniopus Galindo & Blanton, 1954
- Culex putumayensis Matheson, 1934 — Brazil, Ecuador, Peru, Suriname, Trinidad and Tobago, French Guiana
- Culex quadrifoliatus Komp, 1936 — Panama
- Culex quasihibridus Galindo & Blanton, 1954 — Colombia, Panama
- Culex rabanicola Floch & Abonnenc, 1946 — French Guiana
- Culex rabelloi Forattini & Sallum, 1987 — Argentina, Brazil
- Culex rachoui Duret, 1968 — Brazil
- Culex radiatus Senevet & Abonnenc, 1939
- Culex reductor Dyar & Knab, 1909
- Culex ribeirensis Forattini & Sallum, 1985 — Brazil
- Culex ronderosi De Linero, 1967 — Venezuela
- Culex rooti Rozeboom, 1935 — Argentina, Belize, Colombia, Mexico, Panama, Venezuela
- Culex rorotaensis Floch & Abonnenc, 1946 — Brazil, Suriname, French Guiana
- Culex ruffinis Dyar & Shannon, 1924
- Culex sacchettae Sirivanakarn & Jacob, 1981 — Brazil
- Culex saramaccensis Bonne-Wepster & Bonne., 1919 — Ecuador, Suriname, French Guiana
- Culex sardinerae Fox, 1953 — Guatemala, Panama, Puerto Rico
- Culex seneveti Clastrier, 1970
- Culex serratimarge Root, 1927 — Argentina, Bolivia, Brazil, Colombia, Guatemala, Nicaragua, Panama, Paraguay, Peru, Trinidad and Tobago, Venezuela, French Guiana
- Culex silvai Duret, 1968 — Brazil
- Culex simulator Dyar & Knab, 1906 — Panama, Trinidad and Tobago, Venezuela
- Culex spathulatus Forattini & Sallum, 1987 — Brazil
- Culex spinifer Sá & Sallum, 2020
- Culex spiniformis Sá & Hutchings, 2022
- Culex spissipes (Theobald, 1903) — Belize, Bolivia, Brazil, Colombia, Ecuador, Guatemala, Honduras, Mexico, Panama, Peru, Suriname, Trinidad and Tobago, Venezuela, French Guiana
- Culex sursumptor Dyar, 1924 — Colombia, Ecuador, Panama, Venezuela
- Culex symbletos Sallum & Hutchings, 2003 — Brazil, Peru
- Culex taeniopus Dyar & Knab, 1907 — Argentina, Bahamas, Belize, Bolivia, Colombia, Costa Rica, Dominican Republic, Guatemala, Honduras, Jamaica, Mexico, Nicaragua, Panama, Peru, Venezuela, Puerto Rico, Cayman Islands, French Guiana
- Culex tecmarsis Dyar, 1918 — Colombia, Costa Rica, Panama, Venezuela
- Culex terebor Dyar, 1920 — Suriname
- Culex terepaima Anduze, 1948
- Culex theobaldi (Lutz, 1904) — Argentina, Belize, Bolivia, Brazil, Colombia, Costa Rica, Ecuador, Guatemala, Honduras, Mexico, Nicaragua, Panama, Peru, Suriname, Uruguay, Venezuela, French Guiana
- Culex thomasi Evans., 1924
- Culex tosimus Dyar,
- Culex tournieri Senevet & Abonnenc, 1939 — French Guiana
- Culex tovari Evans, 1924
- Culex trachycampa Dyar & Knab, 1909
- Culex trifidus Dyar, 1921 — Costa Rica, El Salvador, Guatemala, Honduras, Mexico, Panama
- Culex trigeminatus Clastrier, 1970 — Brazil, French Guiana
- Culex trilobulatus Duret & Barreto, 1956 — Brazil
- Culex trisetosus Fauran, 1961 — French Guiana
- Culex unicornis Root, 1928 — Venezuela, French Guiana
- Culex vapulans Dyar, 1920
- Culex vaxus Dyar, 1920
- Culex venezuelensis Anduze, 1948
- Culex vexillifer Komp, 1936 — Belize, Honduras, Panama
- Culex vidali Floch & Fauran, 1954 — French Guiana
- Culex vogelsangi Anduze, 1948
- Culex vomerifer Komp, 1932 — Brazil, Colombia, Ecuador, Panama, Peru, Trinidad and Tobago, Venezuela, French Guiana
- Culex wepsterae Komp & Rozeboom, 1951 — Suriname
- Culex xivylis Dyar, 1920
- Culex ybarmis Dyar, 1920 — Brazil, Suriname, Trinidad and Tobago, Venezuela, French Guiana
- Culex zabanicus Talaga & Duchemin, 2023
- Culex zeteki Dyar, 1918 — Belize, Brazil, Colombia, Nicaragua, Panama, Paraguay, Suriname, Trinidad and Tobago, Venezuela, French Guiana

== Subgenus Micraedes Coquillett ==
- Culex antillummagnorum Dyar, 1928 — Cuba
- Culex arawak Berlin, 1969 — Jamaica
- Culex biscaynensis Zavortink & O'Meara, 1999 — United States
- Culex bisulcatus Coquillett, 1905 — Trinidad and Tobago, Antilles
- Culex erethyzonfer Galindo & Blanton, 1954 — Costa Rica, Panama
- Culex jalisco Berlin, 1974 — Mexico
- Culex sandrae Berlin, 1969 — Mexico
- Culex schicki Berlin, 1969 — Mexico

== Subgenus Microculex Theobald ==
- Culex albipes Lutz, 1904 — Brazil
- Culex aphylactus Root, 1927 — Brazil
- Culex aureus Lane & Whitman, 1951 — Brazil
- Culex azymus Dyar & Knab, 1906 — Trinidad and Tobago
- Culex carioca Lane & Whitman, 1951 — Brazil, Colombia
- Culex chryselatus Dyar & Knab, 1919 — Brazil, Colombia, Ecuador, Panama, Suriname, Venezuela, French Guiana
- Culex consolator Dyar & Knab, 1906 — Brazil, Trinidad and Tobago
- Culex trychnus Root, 1927
- Culex daumastocampa Dyar & Knab, 1908 — Colombia, Costa Rica, Panama
- Culex davisi Kumm, 1933 — Brazil
- Culex dubitans Lane & Whitman, 1951 — Brazil
- Culex elongatus Rozeboom & Komp, 1950 — Colombia, Peru
- Culex gairus Root, 1927 — Brazil
- Culex gaudeator Dyar & Knab, 1907 — Costa Rica, Panama
- Culex hedys Root, 1927 — Brazil
- Culex imitator Theobald, 1903 — Argentina, Brazil, Colombia, Ecuador, Guyana, Mexico, Suriname, Trinidad and Tobago, Uruguay, Venezuela, French Guiana
- Culex argenteoumbrosus Theobald, 1907
- Culex daumasturus Dyar & Knab, 1906
- Culex vector Dyar & Knab, 1906 — Brazil
- Culex inimitabilis Dyar & Knab, 1906 — Brazil, Grenada, Suriname, Trinidad and Tobago, Venezuela — Brazil
- Culex intermedius Lane & Whitman, 1951 — Brazil
- Culex jenningsi Dyar & Knab, 1907 — Colombia, Panama
- Culex kukenan Anduze, 1942 — Colombia, Venezuela
- Culex lanei De Oliveira Coutinho & Forattini, 1962 — Brazil
- Culex microphyllus Root, 1927 — Brazil
- Culex neglectus Lutz, 1904 — Brazil
- Culex pleuristriatus Theobald, 1903 — Bolivia, Brazil, Guyana, Suriname, Trinidad and Tobago, Venezuela, French Guiana
- Culex pulidoi Cova Garcia & Sutil Oramas, 1974 — Venezuela
- Culex reducens Lane & Whitman, 1951 — Brazil
- Culex reginae Floch & Fauran, 1955 — French Guiana
- Culex rejector Dyar & Knab, 1906 — Belize, Costa Rica, Guatemala, Mexico, Nicaragua
- Culex shopei Forattini & Toda, 1966 — Brazil
- Culex siphanulatus Lourenco de Oliveira & da Silva, 1987 — Brazil
- Culex stonei Lane & Whitman, 1943 — Brazil, Peru, Suriname, Trinidad and Tobago, French Guiana
- Culex sutili Cova Garcia & Pulido F, 1974 — Venezuela
- Culex worontzowi Pessoa & Galvao, 1936 — Brazil
- Culex xenophobus Ronderos, 1965 — Venezuela

== Subgenus Neoculex Dyar ==
- Culex apicalis Adams, 1903 — Mexico, United States
- Culex arizonensis Bohart, 1948 — Mexico, United States
- Culex boharti Brookman & Reeves, 1950 — United States
- Culex chaetoventralis (Theobald, 1910) — Australia
- Culex cheesmanae Mattingly & Marks, 1955 — New Caledonia
- Culex crassistylus Brug, 1934 — Indonesia
- Culex derivator Dyar & Knab, 1906 — Costa Rica, Mexico, Panama
- Culex douglasi Dobrotworsky, 1956 — Australia
- Culex dumbletoni Belkin, 1962 — New Caledonia
- Culex europaeus Ramos, Ribeiro & Harrison, 2003 — Portugal
- Culex fergusoni (Taylor, 1914) — Australia
- Culex frickii Ludlow, 1906
- Culex gamma Séguy, 1924 — Algeria
- Culex gaufini Belkin, 1962 — New Caledonia
- Culex impudicus Ficalbi, 1890 — Iran, Italy, Morocco, Portugal, Spain
- Culex johni Cova Garcia, Pulido F. & Escalante de Ugueto, 1979 — Venezuela
- Culex judaicus Edwards, 1926 — Israel, Jordan
- Culex latus Dobrotworsky, 1956 — Australia
- Culex leonardi Belkin, 1962 — Australia, Solomon Islands
- Culex martinii Medschid, 1930 — Bosnia & Herzegovina, Czech Republic, Germany, Hungary, Italy, Morocco, Romania, Slovakia, Tajikistan, Turkey, Uzbekistan, Yugoslavia (Serbia and Montenegro)
- Culex millironi Belkin, 1962 — New Caledonia
- Culex nematoides Dyar & Shannon, 1925
- Culex pedicellus King & Hoogstraal, 1947 — Indonesia
- Culex postspiraculosus Lee, 1944 — Australia
- Culex pseudomelanoconia Theobald, 1907 — Australia
- Culex pyrenaicus Brolemann, 1919
- Culex reevesi Bohart, 1948
- Culex reevesi Wirth, 1948 — Mexico, United States
- Culex rubensis Sasa & Takahashi, 1948 — Japan, Korea, Russia
- Culex saxatilis Grossbeck, 1905
- Culex sergentii Theobald, 1903
- Culex territans Walker, 1856 — Canada, Czech Republic, Germany, Greece, Iran, Iraq, Jordan, Luxembourg, Poland, Portugal, Romania, Russia, Slovakia, Spain, Turkey, United States, Yugoslavia (Serbia & Montenegro, Europe)

== Subgenus Nomina Dubia ==
- Culex aikenii Aiken & Rowland, 1906 — Guyana
- Culex americanus Neveu-Lemaire, 1902 — Brazil, Trinidad and Tobago, French Guiana, Antilles
- Culex barkerii (Theobald, 1907) — Indonesia, Malaysia
- Culex bernardi (Borel, 1926) — Vietnam
- Culex chrysothorax (Peryassu, 1908) — Brazil
- Culex chrysothorax Newstead & Thomas, 1910 — Brazil
- Culex decorator Dyar & Knab, 1906 — Trinidad and Tobago
- Culex epirus Aiken, 1909 — Guyana
- Culex fasciolatus (Lutz, 1904. In Bourroul 1904) — Brazil
- Culex gravitator Dyar & Knab, 1906 — Mexico
- Culex humilis Theobald, 1901 — Brazil
- Culex indecorabilis (Theobald, 1903) — Brazil
- Culex lugens Lutz, 1905 — Brazil
- Culex maculatus Von Humboldt, 1819 — Ecuador
- Culex microtaeniata Theobald, 1911 — Indonesia
- Culex mindanaoensis Baisas, 1935 — Philippines
- Culex nigrescens (Theobald, 1907) — Brazil, Venezuela, French Guiana
- Culex nigricorpus (Theobald, 1901) — Brazil
- Culex novaeguineae Evenhuis, 1989
- Culex oblita Lynch Arribalzaga, 1891 — Argentina
- Culex pallipes Robineau-Desvoidy, 1827 — Brazil
- Culex suborientalis Baisas, 1938 — Philippines
- Culex ventralis Walker, 1865 — Papua New Guinea
- Culex virgultus Theobald, 1901 — Brazil
- Culex vulgaris Linnaeus, 1792 — Sweden

== Subgenus Oculeomyia Theobald ==
- Culex albinervis Edwards, 1929
- Culex annulioris Theobald, 1901
- Culex aurantapex Edwards, 1914
- Culex bitaeniorhynchus Giles, 1901 — Djibouti, Gabon, Gambia, Ghana, India, Indonesia, Iran, Japan, Kenya, Korea, Laos, Lesotho, Madagascar, Malaysia, Mozambique, Namibia, Nepal, Nigeria, Pakistan, Palau, Philippines, Russia, Senegal, South Africa, Sri Lanka, Sudan, Taiwan, Tanzania, Thailand, Uganda, Vietnam, Yemen, Zambia, Zimbabwe, New Caledonia, Zaire
- Culex cornutus Edwards, 1922
- Culex epidesmus (Theobald, 1910)
- Culex geminus Colless, 1955
- Culex giganteus Ventrillon, 1906
- Culex infula Theobald, 1901
- Culex kinabaluensis Sirivanakarn, 1976
- Culex longicornis Sirivanakarn, 1976
- Culex luzonensis Sirivanakarn, 1976
- Culex pseudosinensis Colless, 1955
- Culex samoaensis (Theobald, 1914)
- Culex selangorensis Sirivanakarn, 1976
- Culex sinensis Theobald, 1903 — Bangladesh, China, India, Indonesia, Japan, Korea, Malaysia, Nepal, Papua New Guinea, Philippines, Russia, Sudan, Taiwan, Vietnam, Myanmar
- Culex squamosus (Taylor, 1914)
- Culex starckeae Stone & Knight, 1958

== Subgenus Lasioconops Theobald ==
- Culex poicilipes (Theobald, 1903)

== Subgenus Phenacomyia Harbach & Peyton ==
- Culex airozai Lane, 1945 — Brazil
- Culex basilicus Dyar & Knab, 1906
- Culex corniger Theobald, 1903 — Belize, Bolivia, Brazil, Colombia, Costa Rica, Cuba, Dominican Republic, Ecuador, El Salvador, Guatemala, Guyana, Haiti, Honduras, Jamaica, Mexico, Nicaragua, Panama, Peru, Suriname, Trinidad and Tobago, Uruguay, Venezuela, French Guiana, Guadeloupe
- Culex hassardii Grabham, 1906
- Culex lactator Dyar & Knab, 1906 — Mexico
- Culex loquaculus Dyar & Knab, 1909
- Culex rigidus Senevet & Abonnenc, 1939
- Culex subfuscus Theobald, 1907

== Subgenus Sirivanakarnius Tanaka ==
- Culex boninensis Bohart, 1956 — Japan

== Subgenus Tinolestes Coquillett ==
- Culex breviculus Senevet & Abonnenc, 1939 — Brazil, French Guiana
- Culex mojuensis Duret & Damasceno, 1955
- Culex cauchensis Floch & Abonnenc, 1945 — Brazil, French Guiana
- Culex latisquama (Coquillett, 1905) — Costa Rica, Panama, Suriname, United States

== Uncertain subgenus ==
- Culex automartus Root, 1927
- Culex cairnsensis (Taylor, 1919) — Australia
- Culex flochi Duret, 1969 — Brazil, Colombia, French Guiana
- Culex inornata (Theobald, 1905) — Guyana
- Culex nicaroensis Duret, 1967 — Cuba
- Culex nigrimacula Lane & Whitman, 1943 — Brazil, French Guiana
- Culex ocellatus Theobald, 1903 — Bolivia, Brazil, Colombia, French Guiana
- Culex punctiscapularis Floch & Abonnenc, 1946 — French Guiana
- Culex romeroi Surcouf & Gonzalez-Rincones, 1912 — Venezuela

== Extinct species ==
- †Culex damnatorum Scudder, 1890

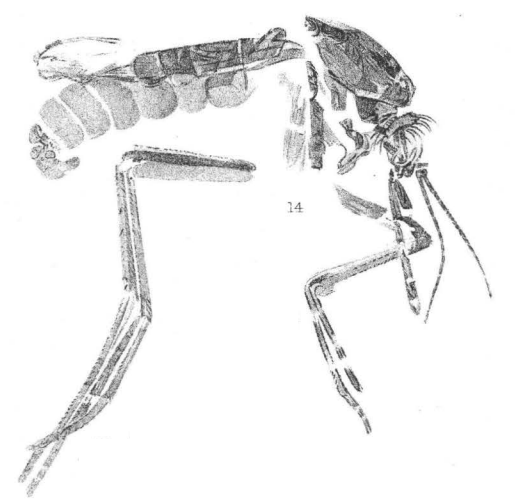
Illustration of a Culex damnatorum type specimen in lateral view. Wasatchian, Early Eocene; Lake Gosiute, Green River Formation; Fossil Fish Cut,3–4 kilometres (1.9–2.5 mi) West of Green River, Sweetwater County, Wyoming, USA Museum of Comparative Zoology, Harvard University, Cambridge, Massachusetts, USA

- †Culex ekaterinae Giłka et al., 2021
- †Culex erikae Szadziewski and Szadziewska, 1985
- †Culex flavus Gistl, 1831
- †Culex malariager Poinar, 2005

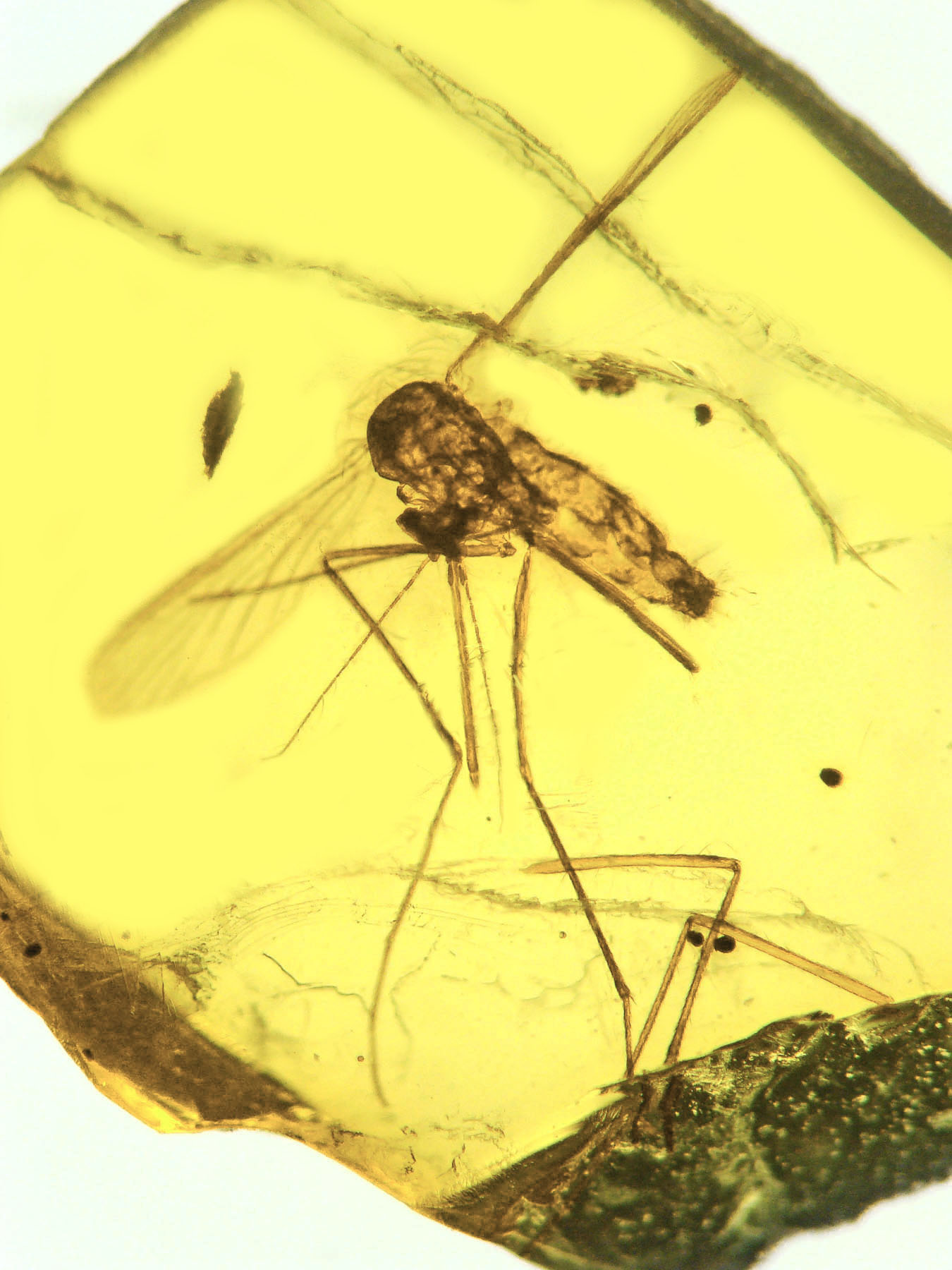
Culex malariager, infected with the malarial parasite Plasmodium dominicana, in 15–20 million year old Dominican amber

- †Culex protorhinus Cockerell, 1915
- †Culex vectensis Edwards, 1923
- †Culex winchesteri Cockere ll, 1919
- †Culex tanzaniae Capasso, 1991 (Nomen Dobium)
