= Aedes alboniveus =

Scientific classification
- Domain: Eukaryota
- Kingdom: Animalia
- Phylum: Arthropoda
- Class: Insecta
- Order: Diptera
- Family: Culicidae
- Genus: Aedes
- Subgenus: Downsiomyia
- Species: A. alboniveus

Binomial name
- Aedes alboniveus (Barraud, 1934)

Mosquito species

Aedes alboniveus is a species of mosquito in the genus Aedes. It was described by Philip James Barraud in 1934.
