= Culex infantulus =

Scientific classification
- Domain: Eukaryota
- Kingdom: Animalia
- Phylum: Arthropoda
- Class: Insecta
- Order: Diptera
- Family: Culicidae
- Genus: Culex
- Species: C. infantulus

Binomial name
- Culex infantulus Edwards, 1922

Synonyms
- Culex parainfantulus Menon, 1944

Species of mosquito

Culex (Lophoceraomyia) infantulus is a species of mosquito belonging to the genus Culex. It is found in Cambodia, China, Hong Kong, India, Indonesia, Japan, South Korea, Malaysia, Maldives, Myanmar, Nepal, Philippines, Sri Lanka, Thailand, and Vietnam.
