= Culex lineata =

Scientific classification
- Kingdom: Animalia
- Phylum: Arthropoda
- Class: Insecta
- Order: Diptera
- Family: Culicidae
- Genus: Culex
- Species: C. lineata

Binomial name
- Culex lineata Theobald, 1912

Synonyms
- Pseudohowardina lineata Theobald, 1912; Culex pulchrithorax Edwards 1914

Species of mosquito

Culex lineata is a species of mosquito in the genus Culex.

== Distribution ==
Mozambique, South Africa
