= Culex thriambus =

Scientific classification
- Kingdom: Animalia
- Phylum: Arthropoda
- Class: Insecta
- Order: Diptera
- Family: Culicidae
- Genus: Culex
- Species: C. thriambus

Binomial name
- Culex thriambus Dyar, 1921

Mosquito species

Culex thriambus is a mosquito species that appears in the southwestern United States, including Southern California, Texas, as well as in Mexico. It is a confirmed vector of West Nile virus. The majority of host species the mosquito takes blood from are in the order Passeriformes.
