= Culex minutissimus =

Scientific classification
- Domain: Eukaryota
- Kingdom: Animalia
- Phylum: Arthropoda
- Class: Insecta
- Order: Diptera
- Family: Culicidae
- Genus: Culex
- Species: C. minutissimus

Binomial name
- Culex minutissimus (Theobald, 1907)

Synonyms
- Culiciomyia nigerrima Theobald, 1910; Melanoconion juxtapallidiceps Theobald, 1910

Species of mosquito

Culex (Lophoceraomyia) minutissimus is a species of mosquito belonging to the genus Culex. It is found in Bangladesh, India, Indonesia, Java, Borneo, China, Malaysia, Maldives, Pakistan, Sri Lanka and Thailand.
