= Culex brevipalpis =

Scientific classification
- Domain: Eukaryota
- Kingdom: Animalia
- Phylum: Arthropoda
- Class: Insecta
- Order: Diptera
- Family: Culicidae
- Genus: Culex
- Species: C. brevipalpis

Binomial name
- Culex brevipalpis (Giles, 1902)

Synonyms
- Culex fidelis Dyar, 1920; Culex longipes Theobald, 1901; Culex macropus Blanchard, 1905; Melanoconion uniformis Leicester, 1908

Species of mosquito

Culex (Eumelanomyia) brevipalpis is a species of mosquito belonging to the genus Culex. It is found in India, Sri Lanka, Thailand, Bangladesh, Pakistan, Philippines, Singapore, Cambodia, Indochina, China, Taiwan, Ryukyu-Retto, New Guinea, Maluku, Indonesia, Malaysia, Myanmar, Japan, Vietnam and Bismarcks.
