= Culex nigropunctatus =

Scientific classification
- Domain: Eukaryota
- Kingdom: Animalia
- Phylum: Arthropoda
- Class: Insecta
- Order: Diptera
- Family: Culicidae
- Genus: Culex
- Species: C. nigropunctatus

Binomial name
- Culex nigropunctatus Edwards, 1922

Synonyms
- Culiciomyia annulata Theobald, 1907

Species of mosquito

Culex (Culiciomyia) nigropunctatus is a species of mosquito belonging to the genus Culex. It is found in Bangladesh, Borneo, Malaysia, Cambodia, China, Hong Kong, India, Indonesia, Japan, Laos, Malaysia, Micronesia (Wake Island), Nepal, Palau, Philippines, Singapore, Sri Lanka, Thailand, Taiwan, and Vietnam.
