= Culex bahri =

Scientific classification
- Domain: Eukaryota
- Kingdom: Animalia
- Phylum: Arthropoda
- Class: Insecta
- Order: Diptera
- Family: Culicidae
- Genus: Culex
- Species: C. bahri

Binomial name
- Culex bahri (Edwards, 1914)

Synonyms
- Orthopodomyia lemmonae Thurman, 1959

Species of mosquito

Culex (Culiciomyia) bahri is a species of mosquito belonging to the genus Culex. It is known to be endemic to Sri Lanka and occurrence from Indonesia is not clear.
