= Culex pluvialis =

Scientific classification
- Domain: Eukaryota
- Kingdom: Animalia
- Phylum: Arthropoda
- Class: Insecta
- Order: Diptera
- Family: Culicidae
- Genus: Culex
- Species: C. pluvialis

Binomial name
- Culex pluvialis Barraud, 1924

Species of mosquito

Culex (Eumelanomyia) pluvialis is a species of mosquito belonging to the genus Culex. It is found in India, Malaysia and Sri Lanka.
