= Culex bicornutus =

Scientific classification
- Domain: Eukaryota
- Kingdom: Animalia
- Phylum: Arthropoda
- Class: Insecta
- Order: Diptera
- Family: Culicidae
- Genus: Culex
- Species: C. bicornutus

Binomial name
- Culex bicornutus (Theobald, 1910)

Species of mosquito

Culex (Lophoceraomyia) bicornutus is a species of zoophilic mosquito belonging to the genus Culex. It is found in India, Sri Lanka, China, Japan, Malaysia, Myanmar, Thailand, and Vietnam.
