= Culex modestus =

Scientific classification
- Kingdom: Animalia
- Phylum: Arthropoda
- Class: Insecta
- Order: Diptera
- Family: Culicidae
- Genus: Culex
- Species: C. modestus

Binomial name
- Culex modestus Ficalbi, 1889.

Species of mosquito

Culex modestus (no common name) is a species of blood-feeding mosquito of the family Culicidae.

== Distribution ==
Cx. modestus has been found to occur in the following countries: Algeria, China, Croatia, Czech Republic, Denmark, Finland, Greece, Hungary, Iran, Iraq, Israel, Italy, Mongolia, Morocco, Poland, Romania, Russia, Slovakia, Spain, Sweden, Tajikistan, Turkey, and the United Kingdom. It was recently rediscovered in the United Kingdom, where larval surveys in 2010 and 2011 identified populations in a small area of southeast England. A significant number of Culex modestus specimens was found in 2018 in Leningrad region of Russia, in which only occasional findings were known earlier.

== Ecology ==
Cx. modestus larvae live in fresh to slightly saline water in irrigation channels, marshes, and rice fields. Adult Cx. modestus females feed on blood of vertebrates, especially birds, horses, and humans; males feed on nectar.

== Medical importance ==
It has been experimentally demonstrated to be capable of transmitting West Nile virus (WNV), and its habit of feeding aggressively on both birds and humans gives it significant potential for transmission of zoonotic infections from birds to humans. It is believed to be the principle bridge vector of WNV between birds and humans in southern France and is thought to have played a role in WNV transmission in the Danube delta, Caspian and Azov sea deltas, and the Volga region in Russia. It has also been implicated in Tahyna virus and Lednice virus transmission in France and Slovakia, respectively.
