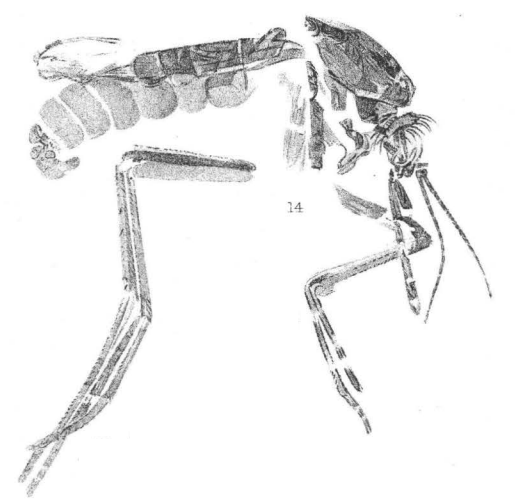
- Illustration of the type specimen

Scientific classification
- Kingdom: Animalia
- Phylum: Arthropoda
- Class: Insecta
- Order: Diptera
- Family: Culicidae
- Genus: Culex
- Species: †C. damnatorum

Binomial name
- †Culex damnatorum Scudder, 1890

= Culex damnatorum =

Extinct species of mosquito

Culex damnatorum is an extinct species of mosquito belonging to the genus Culex, living 33.9-56 million years ago during the Cenozoic and Eocene. It is known from three female specimens collected in Green River, Wyoming.

The body of C. damnatorum is 6 mm in length, the thorax being 1.8 mm. Antennae are 2 mm and the stout proboscis is 1.9 mm.
