= Culex pallidothorax =

Scientific classification
- Domain: Eukaryota
- Kingdom: Animalia
- Phylum: Arthropoda
- Class: Insecta
- Order: Diptera
- Family: Culicidae
- Genus: Culex
- Species: C. pallidothorax

Binomial name
- Culex pallidothorax Theobald, 1905

Synonyms
- Culex albopleura Theobald, 1907

Species of mosquito

Culex (Culiciomyia) pallidothorax is a species of mosquito belonging to the genus Culex. It is found in Bangladesh, Cambodia, China, Hong Kong, India, Indonesia, Japan, Macau, Malaysia, Myanmar, Nepal, Philippines, Irian Jaya, Maluku, Ryukyu, Sri Lanka, Thailand, Taiwan, Timor, and Vietnam.
