= Culex axillicola =

Scientific classification
- Kingdom: Animalia
- Phylum: Arthropoda
- Class: Insecta
- Order: Diptera
- Family: Culicidae
- Genus: Culex
- Species: C. axillicola

Binomial name
- Culex axillicola Steffan, 1979

Synonyms
- Culex axillicolus Steffan, 1979

Species of mosquito

Culex axillicola is a species of mosquito in the genus Culex.

== Distribution ==
Pukamil Hamlet, Minj, Western Highlands Province, Papua New Guinea.
