= Culex erythrothorax =

Scientific classification
- Kingdom: Animalia
- Phylum: Arthropoda
- Class: Insecta
- Order: Diptera
- Family: Culicidae
- Genus: Culex
- Species: C. erythrothorax

Binomial name
- Culex erythrothorax Dyar, 1907

Species of mosquito

Culex erythrothorax is a species of mosquito that appears in Southern California. It is also known as the tule mosquito due to its preference for breeding in tule plants. The species has a brownish-orange color. It is a confirmed vector of West Nile virus.
