= Culex bailyi =

Scientific classification
- Domain: Eukaryota
- Kingdom: Animalia
- Phylum: Arthropoda
- Class: Insecta
- Order: Diptera
- Family: Culicidae
- Genus: Culex
- Species: C. bailyi

Binomial name
- Culex bailyi Barraud, 1934

Species of mosquito

Culex (Culiciomyia) bailyi is a species of zoophilic mosquito belonging to the genus Culex. It is found in India, Sri Lanka, Thailand, Cambodia, Indonesia, Malaysia, Myanmar, Papua New Guinea, Philippines and New Guinea.
