= Culex fragilis =

Scientific classification
- Domain: Eukaryota
- Kingdom: Animalia
- Phylum: Arthropoda
- Class: Insecta
- Order: Diptera
- Family: Culicidae
- Genus: Culex
- Species: C. fragilis

Binomial name
- Culex fragilis Ludlow, 1903

Synonyms
- Culex graminis Leicester, 1908; Culiciomyia ceylonica Theobald, 1907; Culiciomyia inornata Theobald, 1907; Trichorhynchus fusus Theobald, 1905

Species of mosquito

Culex (Culiciomyia) fragilis is a species of mosquito belonging to the genus Culex. It is found in India, Sri Lanka, Borneo, Malaysia, Cambodia, Indonesia, Malaysia, New Guinea (Island); Papua New Guinea, Philippines, Solomon Islands, Thailand, and Vietnam.
