= Culex malayi =

Scientific classification
- Domain: Eukaryota
- Kingdom: Animalia
- Phylum: Arthropoda
- Class: Insecta
- Order: Diptera
- Family: Culicidae
- Genus: Culex
- Species: C. malayi

Binomial name
- Culex malayi (Leicester, 1908)

Synonyms
- Aedes nigrescens Theobald, 1907; Aioretomyia aedes Leicester, 1908

Species of mosquito

Culex (Eumelanomyia) malayi is a species of mosquito belonging to the genus Culex. It is found in Bangladesh, Cambodia, China, India, Indonesia, Malaysia, Maldives, Myanmar, Nepal, Pakistan, Sri Lanka, Thailand, Taiwan, Timor and Vietnam.
