= Culex mimulus =

Scientific classification
- Domain: Eukaryota
- Kingdom: Animalia
- Phylum: Arthropoda
- Class: Insecta
- Order: Diptera
- Family: Culicidae
- Genus: Culex
- Species: C. mimulus

Binomial name
- Culex mimulus Edwards, 1915

Synonyms
- Culex confusus Baisas, 1938; Culex mossmani Taylor, 1915; Culex neomimulus Lien, 1968

Species of mosquito

Culex (Culex) mimulus is a species of mosquito belonging to the genus Culex. It is found in Australia, Bangladesh, Cambodia, China, Hong Kong, India, Indonesia, Malaysia, Myanmar, Nepal, New Guinea (Island); Papua New Guinea, Pakistan, Philippines, Singapore, Sri Lanka, Thailand, Taiwan and Vietnam. Larvae can be found from agro wells and adults are malaria vectors.
