= Culex castrensis =

Scientific classification
- Domain: Eukaryota
- Kingdom: Animalia
- Phylum: Arthropoda
- Class: Insecta
- Order: Diptera
- Family: Culicidae
- Genus: Culex
- Species: C. castrensis

Binomial name
- Culex castrensis Edwards, 1922

Synonyms
- Culex nigrescens Theobald, 1907

Species of mosquito

Culex (Eumelanomyia) castrensis is a species of mosquito belonging to the genus Culex. It is found in India, and Sri Lanka
