= Culex biscaynensis =

Scientific classification
- Kingdom: Animalia
- Phylum: Arthropoda
- Class: Insecta
- Order: Diptera
- Family: Culicidae
- Genus: Culex
- Species: C. biscaynensis

Binomial name
- Culex biscaynensis Zavortink & O'Meara, 1999

Species of mosquito

Culex biscaynensis is a species of mosquito in the genus Culex.

== Distribution ==
It is found in Florida, United States.
