= Culex mammilifer =

Scientific classification
- Kingdom: Animalia
- Phylum: Arthropoda
- Class: Insecta
- Order: Diptera
- Family: Culicidae
- Genus: Culex
- Species: C. mammilifer

Binomial name
- Culex mammilifer (Leicester, 1908)

Synonyms
- Culex chiungchungensis Hsu, 1963

Species of mosquito

Culex (Lophoceraomyia) mammilifer is a species of mosquito belonging to the genus Culex. It is found in Cambodia, China, India, the Andaman Islands, Indonesia, Malaysia, Philippines, Sri Lanka, and Thailand.
