= Culex crinicauda =

Scientific classification
- Kingdom: Animalia
- Phylum: Arthropoda
- Class: Insecta
- Order: Diptera
- Family: Culicidae
- Genus: Culex
- Species: C. crinicauda

Binomial name
- Culex crinicauda Edwards, 1921

Synonyms
- Culex parvus Taylor, 1912

Species of mosquito

Culex crinicauda is a species of mosquito in the genus Culex. It is found in northern Australia and breeds in fresh, clear ground water and large containers.

== Description ==
A small to medium-sized mosquito, C. crinicauda is mainly pale with a banded proboscis. Palps black, proboscis black but with a narrow white band. Scutal integument brown with narrow brown and bronze scales. Scutellum and pronotum pale. Abdominal tergites are black with straight, creamy basal banding, sternites are pale. Tibiae are mainly dark, femora somewhat mottled, and tarsi basally banded. Wings dark.
