= Culex uniformis =

Scientific classification
- Domain: Eukaryota
- Kingdom: Animalia
- Phylum: Arthropoda
- Class: Insecta
- Order: Diptera
- Family: Culicidae
- Genus: Culex
- Species: C. uniformis

Binomial name
- Culex uniformis (Theobald, 1905)

Species of mosquito

Culex (Lophoceraomyia) uniformis is a species of mosquito belonging to the genus Culex. It is found in India, Malaysia, Hainan Island, New Guinea, Philippines and Sri Lanka. A sup-species Culex (Lophoceraomyia) uniformis ssp. mercedesae is named after the Filipino acarologist Mercedes Delfinado.
