= Culex rubithoracis =

Scientific classification
- Domain: Eukaryota
- Kingdom: Animalia
- Phylum: Arthropoda
- Class: Insecta
- Order: Diptera
- Family: Culicidae
- Genus: Culex
- Species: C. rubithoracis

Binomial name
- Culex rubithoracis (Leicester, 1908)

Species of mosquito

Culex (Lophoceraomyia) rubithoracis is a species of mosquito belonging to the genus Culex. It is found in Cambodia, China, Guam, Hong Kong, India, Indonesia, Japan, Malaysia, Myanmar, Philippines, Java, Macau, Singapore, Sri Lanka, Thailand, Taiwan and Vietnam.
