= Culex quadripalpis =

Scientific classification
- Domain: Eukaryota
- Kingdom: Animalia
- Phylum: Arthropoda
- Class: Insecta
- Order: Diptera
- Family: Culicidae
- Genus: Culex
- Species: C. quadripalpis

Binomial name
- Culex quadripalpis (Edwards, 1914)

Synonyms
- Culex pachecoi Baisas, 1935; Lophoceratomyia roubaudi Borel, 1926; Lophoceratomyia sylvestris Leicester, 1908

Species of mosquito

Culex (Lophoceraomyia) quadripalpis is a species of mosquito belonging to the genus Culex. It is found in Cambodia, India, Indonesia, Malaysia, Philippines, Singapore, Sri Lanka, Thailand, and Vietnam.
