= Culex sinensis =

Scientific classification
- Kingdom: Animalia
- Phylum: Arthropoda
- Class: Insecta
- Order: Diptera
- Family: Culicidae
- Genus: Culex
- Species: C. sinensis

Binomial name
- Culex sinensis Theobald, 1903

Synonyms
- Culex sepositus Leicester, 1908; Culex tripunctatus Mochizuki, 1913; Taeniorhynchus tenax Leicester, 1908

Species of mosquito

Culex (Lophoceraomyia) sinensis is a species of mosquito belonging to the genus Culex. It is found in Australia, Bangladesh, Cambodia, China, Hong Kong, India, Indonesia, Japan, South Korea, Laos, Malaysia, Myanmar, Nepal, New Guinea (Island); Papua New Guinea, Philippines, Russia, Sri Lanka, Sudan and South Sudan, Taiwan, Thailand, and Vietnam. It is a possible vector of Wuchereria bancrofti.
