= Culex fuscocephala =

Scientific classification
- Domain: Eukaryota
- Kingdom: Animalia
- Phylum: Arthropoda
- Class: Insecta
- Order: Diptera
- Family: Culicidae
- Genus: Culex
- Species: C. fuscocephala

Binomial name
- Culex fuscocephala Theobald, 1907

Synonyms
- Culex fuscitarsis Barraud, 1924; Culex inelegans Dyar, 1920; Culex luteola Theobald, 1910; Culex minimus Leicester, 1908; Culex taytayensis Banks, 1909; Culex uniformis Leicester, 1908

Species of mosquito

Culex (Culex) fuscocephala is a species of mosquito belonging to the genus Culex. It is found in Indonesia, and Sri Lanka, Bangladesh, Cambodia, China, Guam, Hong Kong, Indonesia, Japan, Laos, Malaysia, Myanmar, Nepal, Pakistan, Philippines, Singapore, Thailand, Timor, and Vietnam. It is a vector of Japanese encephalitis virus.
