= Culex obscurus =

Scientific classification
- Kingdom: Animalia
- Phylum: Arthropoda
- Class: Insecta
- Order: Diptera
- Family: Culicidae
- Genus: Culex
- Species: C. obscurus

Binomial name
- Culex obscurus (Leicester, 1908)

Synonyms
- Acalleomyia obscurus Leicester, 1908

Species of mosquito

Culex obscurus is a species of mosquito in the genus Culex.

== Distribution ==
Indonesia, Malaysia
