= Culex asteliae =

Scientific classification
- Kingdom: Animalia
- Phylum: Arthropoda
- Class: Insecta
- Order: Diptera
- Family: Culicidae
- Genus: Culex
- Species: C. asteliae

Binomial name
- Culex asteliae Belkin, 1968

Species of mosquito

Culex asteliae is a species of mosquito from the Culicidae family that is endemic to New Zealand.
