= Culex lasiopalpis =

Scientific classification
- Kingdom: Animalia
- Phylum: Arthropoda
- Clade: Pancrustacea
- Class: Insecta
- Order: Diptera
- Family: Culicidae
- Genus: Culex
- Species: C. lasiopalpis

Binomial name
- Culex lasiopalpis Sirivanakarn, 1977

Species of mosquito

Culex (Lophoceraomyia) lasiopalpis is a species of mosquito belonging to the genus Culex. It is endemic to Sri Lanka, and some texts cite it from India.
