= Culex jacksoni =

Scientific classification
- Domain: Eukaryota
- Kingdom: Animalia
- Phylum: Arthropoda
- Class: Insecta
- Order: Diptera
- Family: Culicidae
- Genus: Culex
- Species: C. jacksoni

Binomial name
- Culex jacksoni Edwards, 1934

Synonyms
- Culex fuscifurcatus Edwards, 1934; Culex kangi Lien, 1968

Species of mosquito

Culex (Culex) jacksoni is a species of mosquito belonging to the genus Culex. It is found in China, Hong Kong, India, South Korea, Nepal, maritime Russia (Furugelm island), Sri Lanka, Thailand, and Taiwan.
