= Culex cinctellus =

Scientific classification
- Kingdom: Animalia
- Phylum: Arthropoda
- Clade: Pancrustacea
- Class: Insecta
- Order: Diptera
- Family: Culicidae
- Genus: Culex
- Species: C. cinctellus

Binomial name
- Culex cinctellus Edwards, 1922

Species of mosquito

Culex (Lophoceraomyia) cinctellus is a species of mosquito belonging to the genus Culex. It is native to Southeast Asia and was dectected in Sri Lanka in 2025.
