= Culex wardi =

Scientific classification
- Domain: Eukaryota
- Kingdom: Animalia
- Phylum: Arthropoda
- Class: Insecta
- Order: Diptera
- Family: Culicidae
- Genus: Culex
- Species: C. wardi

Binomial name
- Culex wardi Sirivanakarn, 1977

Species of mosquito

Culex (Lophoceraomyia) wardi is a species of mosquito belonging to the genus Culex. It is endemic to Sri Lanka.
