= Culex whitmorei =

Scientific classification
- Domain: Eukaryota
- Kingdom: Animalia
- Phylum: Arthropoda
- Class: Insecta
- Order: Diptera
- Family: Culicidae
- Genus: Culex
- Species: C. whitmorei

Binomial name
- Culex whitmorei (Giles, 1904)

Synonyms
- Culex albus Leicester, 1908; Culex loricatus Leicester, 1908; Leucomyia plegepennis Theobald, 1907; Taeniorhynchus argenteus Ludlow, 1905

Species of mosquito

Culex (Culex) whitmorei is a species of mosquito belonging to the genus Culex. It is found in Australia, Bangladesh, China, India, Indonesia, Japan, South Korea, Laos, Malaysia, Nepal, New Guinea (Island); Papua New Guinea, Pakistan, Philippines, Russia, Sri Lanka, Sudan and South Sudan, Taiwan, Thailand, and Vietnam.
