= Culex campilunati =

Scientific classification
- Domain: Eukaryota
- Kingdom: Animalia
- Phylum: Arthropoda
- Class: Insecta
- Order: Diptera
- Family: Culicidae
- Genus: Culex
- Species: C. campilunati

Binomial name
- Culex campilunati Carter & Wijesundara, 1948

Species of mosquito

Culex (Eumelanomyia) campilunati is a species of mosquito belonging to the genus Culex. It is endemic to Sri Lanka. first documented from Moon Plains at Nuwara Eliya.
