= Culex infula =

Scientific classification
- Domain: Eukaryota
- Kingdom: Animalia
- Phylum: Arthropoda
- Class: Insecta
- Order: Diptera
- Family: Culicidae
- Genus: Culex
- Species: C. infula

Binomial name
- Culex infula Theobald, 1901

Synonyms
- Culex afridii Qutubuddin, 1956; Culex ambiguus Theobald; Culex domesticus Leicester; Culex ocellata Theobald; Culex sarawaki Theobald; Culex taeniarostris Theobald; Culex tenax Theobald

Species of mosquito

Culex (Oculeomyia) infula is a species of mosquito belonging to the genus Culex. It is found in Bangladesh, India, Indonesia, Malaysia, Myanmar, Nepal, Philippines, Singapore, Sri Lanka, Thailand, and Vietnam. Adults mainly feeds on cattle but infrequently shows a low proportion of human and bird blood meals. Larvae can be found in water courses with high content of algal populations. In 1998, the species was identified as a vector of Japanese encephalitis virus.
