= Culex palpalis =

Scientific classification
- Kingdom: Animalia
- Phylum: Arthropoda
- Class: Insecta
- Order: Diptera
- Family: Culicidae
- Genus: Culex
- Species: C. palpalis

Binomial name
- Culex palpalis Taylor, 1912

Species of mosquito

Culex palpalis is a species of mosquito in the genus Culex. It breeds in permanent and stable freshwater sites with reeds, algal growth or other vegetation and no pollution. It is common within its distribution of Australia, Papua New Guinea, the Solomon Islands, and Timor-Leste.

== Description ==
C. palpalis is medium sized, with a dark, banded proboscis and palps. It was found that the median length of the pale band is quite variable. Head has brown lateral and white dorsal scales. Scutum with a brown integument clothed with white, yellow and bronze scales which form a lyre pattern that is known also in other species of mosquito. Abdomenal tergites dark with white basal banding, sternites paler. Legs are mainly dark with some pale patches. Wings dark, haltere pale.
