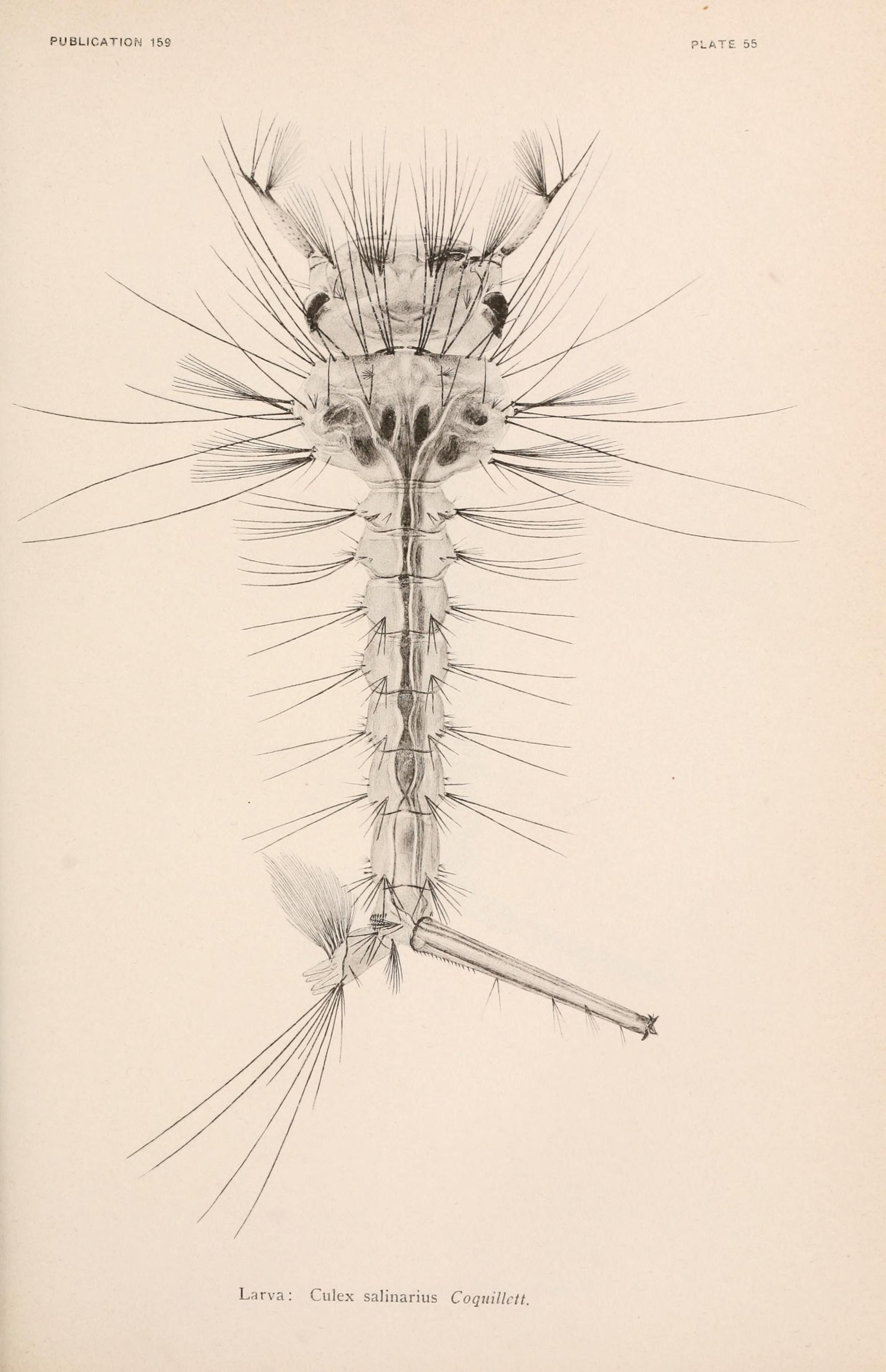
- Larva

Scientific classification
- Kingdom: Animalia
- Phylum: Arthropoda
- Clade: Pancrustacea
- Class: Insecta
- Order: Diptera
- Family: Culicidae
- Genus: Culex
- Species: C. salinarius

Binomial name
- Culex salinarius Coquillett, 1904

= Culex salinarius =

Species of mosquito

Culex salinarius, the unbanded saltmarsh mosquito, is a species of mosquito in the family Culicidae.

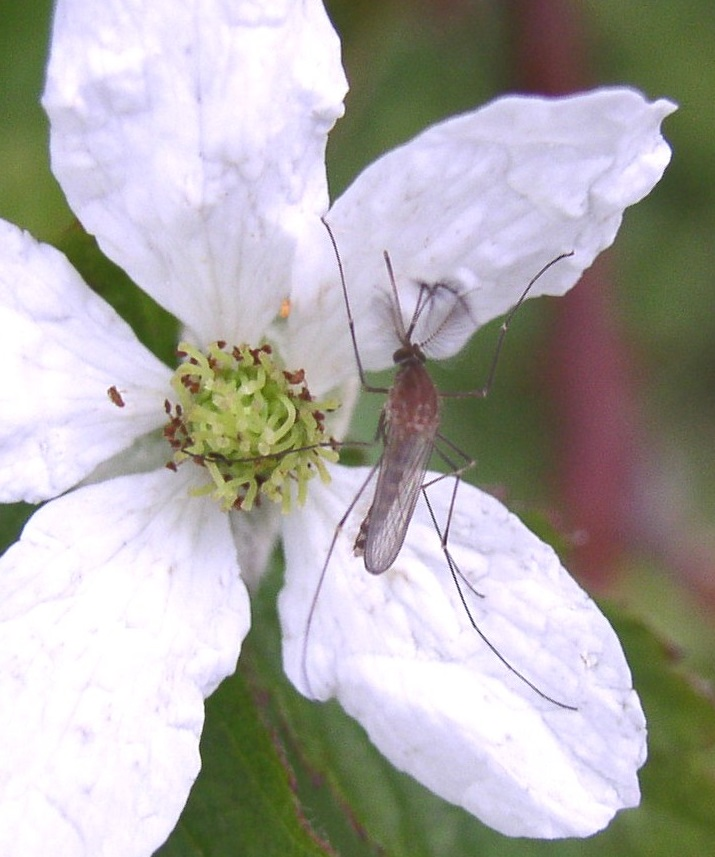
Adult male
