= Culex spathifurca =

Scientific classification
- Domain: Eukaryota
- Kingdom: Animalia
- Phylum: Arthropoda
- Class: Insecta
- Order: Diptera
- Family: Culicidae
- Genus: Culex
- Species: C. spathifurca

Binomial name
- Culex spathifurca (Edwards, 1915)

Synonyms
- Culex stylifurcatus Carter & Wijesundara, 1948

Species of mosquito

Culex (Culiciomyia) spathifurca is a species of mosquito belonging to the genus Culex. It is found in Cambodia, India, Indonesia, Malaysia, Maldives, Borneo, Java, Philippines, Philippines, Singapore, Sri Lanka, Irian Jaya, Maluku, and Thailand. This mosquito shows unique male terminalia with bifurcate gonostylus, which can used to differentiate it from other species. Larva and pupa can be found in tree holes associated with mangrove ecosystems. It is a potential vector of Wuchereria bancrofti, but human bitings are very rare.
