= Philip James Barraud =

British entomologist (1879–1948)

Philip James Barraud (1879 – 9 August 1948) was an English entomologist who specialised in mosquitoes. He wrote the Fauna of British India volume on the mosquitoes (family Culicidae).

Barraud joined the RAMC where he was commissioned as a captain during World War I in Mesopotamia, serving in Salonica and Palestine after which he worked in Basra Iraq. He was chosen to join as entomologist to the Kala-azar commission in India. He later worked in India at the Central Malaria Bureau, which was established at Kasauli, Punjab Province, British India in 1909. Here he invented the Barraud cage (a box of made of muslin or organdie suspended on a wire frame placed inside insulators containing wet towels) for the transport and study of live mosquitoes. Barraud described many new genera and species of Culicidae. His collection, which included Palearctic Lepidoptera is in the Natural History Museum. The genus Barraudius Edwards, F.W., 1921 is named for him. He died at a nursing home in Bournemouth following a long illness.

== Works ==
Partial list:

- Two new species of Culex (Diptera, Culicidae) from Assam. Indian J. Med. Res. 11: 507-509 (1923).
- Two new species of Culex (Diptera, Culicidae) from Assam. Indian Journal of Medical Research 11: 507-509.(1923)
- A revision of the culicine mosquitoes of India. Part XIII. The Indian species of the subgenus Lophoceraomyia (Theo.) Edw., including one new species. Indian Journal of Medical Research 12(1): 39-46.(1924)
- A revision of the culicine mosquitoes of India. Part XII. Some Indian species of Culex L. Indian Journal of Medical Research 11(4): 979-998.(1924).
- with Christophers, S.R. and Shortt, H.E The anatomy of the sandfly Phlebotomus argentipes, Ann. & Brun. (Diptera). Mem. Indian Journal of Medical Research 4: 177-204, 10 pls (1926)
- A revision of the culicine mosquitoes of India. Part I. The genera Stegomyia, Theo. and Christophersiomyia, gen. n. adult stage. Indian Journal of Medical Research 10: 772-788. (1928)
- A revision of the culicine mosquitoes of India, Part XXIII. The genus Aedes (sens. lat.) and the classification of the subgenus. Descriptions of the Indian species of Aedes(Aedimorphus), Aedes (Ochlerotatus), and Aedes (Banksinella), with notes on Aedes (Stegomyia) variegatus. Indian J. Med.Res. 15: 653-69. (1928)
- A review of the culicine mosquitoes of India. Part XXIV. The Indian species of the subgenera Skusea and Aedes, with descriptions of eight new species, and remarks on a method for identifying the females of the genus Aedes. Indian J. Med. Res. 16: 357-75. (1928).
- with Christophers, S.R. The eggs of Indian Anopheles, with descriptions of the hitherto undescribed eggs of a number of species. Rec. Malar. Surv. India. 2: 161-192. (1931)
- Descriptions of eight new species of Indian culicine mosquitoes. Indian Journal of Medical Research 19(2): 609-616.
- The Fauna of British India, Including Ceylon and Burma. Diptera V, family Culicidae, tribes Megarhinini and Culicini.Taylor and Francis, London. 463 p. (1934)
