= List of mosquitoes of Sri Lanka =

Sri Lanka is a tropical island situated close to the southern tip of India. The invertebrate fauna is as large as it is common to other regions of the world. There are about 2 million species of arthropods found in the world, and more are still being discovered to this day. This makes it very complicated and difficult to summarize the exact number of species found within a certain region.

This is a list of the mosquitoes found from Sri Lanka.

== Mosquito ==
Phylum: Arthropoda
Class: Insecta
Order: Diptera

Family: Culicidae

Mosquitoes are small midge-like insects that can be found in terrestrial ecosystems wherever water is abundant. Females of most species are ectoparasites, whose tube-like mouthparts (called a proboscis) pierce the hosts' skin to consume blood. Many species of mosquitoes are vectors of diseases, so important in medicine and other fields. Well over 3,500 species of mosquitoes were found and described, and new species are about to discover. Sri Lanka is home to 131 species of mosquitoes that included to 16 genera with 17 endemic species.

Endemic species are highlighted with letter E.

== Subfamily Anophelinae ==
- Anopheles aconitus Dönitz 1902
- Anopheles aitkenii James 1903
- Anopheles annularis van der Wulp 1884
- Anopheles barbirostris Van der Wulp 1884
- Anopheles barbumbrosus Strickland & Chowdhury 1927
- Anopheles culicifacies Giles, 1901
- Anopheles elegans James 1903
- Anopheles gigas Giles 1901 - E
- Anopheles insulaeflorum Swellengrebel & Swellengrebel de Graaf 1919
- Anopheles interruptus Puri 1929
- Anopheles jamesii Theobald 1901
- Anopheles karwari James 1903
- Anopheles nigerrimus Giles 1900
- Anopheles pallidus Theobald 1901
- Anopheles peditaeniatus Leicester 1908
- Anopheles quadrimaculatus Say 1824
- Anopheles reidi Harrison 1973 - E
- Anopheles subpictus Grassi 1899
- Anopheles tessellatus Theobald
- Anopheles vagus Dönitz 1902
- Anopheles varuna Iyengar 1924

== Subfamily Culicinae ==
- Aedeomyia catasticta Knab 1909
- Aedes aegypti (Linnaeus) 1762
- Aedes albolateralis (Theobald) 1908
- Aedes albopictus (Skuse) 1894
- Aedes alboscutellatus (Theobald) 1905
- Aedes albotaeniatus (Leicester) 1904
- Aedes annulirostris (Theobald) 1905
- Aedes argenteoscutellatus Carter & Wijesundara 1948 - E
- Aedes butleri Theobald 1901
- Aedes chrysolineatus (Theobald) 1907
- Aedes greenii (Theobald) 1903
- Aedes gubernatoris (Giles) 1901
- Aedes harveyi (Barraud) 1923
- Aedes indicus (Theobald) 1907
- Aedes jamesi (Edwards) 1914
- Aedes krombeini (Huang Y-M 1975) - E
- Aedes lankaensis Stone & Night 1958 - E
- Aedes lineatopennis (Ludlow) 1905
- Aedes macdougalli Edwards 1922
- Aedes mediopunctatus (Theobald) 1905 - E
- Aedes niveus (Ludlow) 1903
- Aedes ostentatio (Leicester) 1908
- Aedes pallidostriatus (Theobald) 1907
- Aedes petroelephantus Wijesundara 1951 - E
- Aedes pipersalatus (Giles) 1902
- Aedes pseudomediofasciatus (Theobald) 1910
- Aedes pseudotaeniatus (Giles) 1901
- Aedes quasiferinus Mattingly 1961
- Aedes ramachandrai Reuben 1972
- Aedes reginae Edwards 1922
- Aedes scatophagoides (Theobald) 1901
- Aedes seculatus Menon 1950
- Aedes simplex (Theobald) 1903 - E
- Aedes srilankensis (Reinert J.F. 1977) - E
- Aedes stenoetrus (Theobald) 1907
- Aedes taeniorhyncoides (Christophers) 1911
- Aedes thomsoni (Theobald) 1905
- Aedes vexans (Meigen) 1830
- Aedes vittatus (Bigot) 1861
- Aedes wardi Reinert, 1976
- Aedes yerburyi Edwards. 1917 - E
- Armigeres aureolineatus (Leicester) 1908
- Armigeres subalbatus (Coquillett) 1898
- Armigeres magnus (Theobald) 1908
- Armigeres omissus (Edwards) 1914
- Coquillettidia crassipes (Van der Wulp) 1881
- Culex bahri (Edwards) 1914 - E
- Culex bailyi Barraud 1934
- Culex bicornutus (Theobald) 1910
- Culex bitaeniorhynchus Giles 1901
- Culex brevipalpis (Giles) 1902
- Culex campilunati Carter & Wijesundara 1948 - E
- Culex castrensis Edwards 1922
- Culex fragilis Ludlow 1903
- Culex fuscanus Weidemann 1820
- Culex fuscocephala Theobald 1907
- Culex gelidus Theobald 1901
- Culex halifaxi Theobald 1903
- Culex infantulus Edwards 1922
- Culex infula Theobald 1901
- Culex jacksoni Edwards 1934
- Culex lasiopalpis (Sirivanakarn S. 1977) - E
- Culex malayi (Leicester) 1908
- Culex mammilifer (Leicester) 1908
- Culex mimulus Edwards 1915
- Culex minutissimus (Theobald) 1907
- Culex nigropunctatus Edwards 1926
- Culex pallidothorax Theobald 1905
- Culex pluvialis Barraud 1924
- Culex pseudovishnui Colless 1957
- Culex quadripalpis (Edwards) 1914
- Culex quinquefasciatus Say 1823
- Culex rubithoracis (Leicester) 1908
- Culex sinensis Theobald 1903
- Culex sitiens Weidemann 1828
- Culex spathifurca (Edwards) 1915
- Culex tritaeniorhynchus Giles 1901
- Culex uniformis (Theobald) 1905
- Culex vishnui Theobald 1901
- Culex wardi (Sirivanakarn S. 1977) - E
- Culex whitmorei (Giles) 1904
- Ficalbia minima (Theobald) 1901
- Heizmannia greenii (Theobald) 1905
- Heizmannia carteri Amerasinghe, 1993
- Hodgesia bailyi Barraud 1929
- Hodgesia malayi Leicester 1908
- Malaya genurostris Leicester. 1908
- Mansonia annulifera (Theobald) 1901
- Mansonia indiana Edwards. 1930
- Mansonia uniformis (Theobald) 1901
- Mimomyia chamberlaini (Ludlow) 1904
- Mimomyia hybrida Leicester. 1908
- Mimomyia intermedia (Barraud) 1929
- Mimomyia luzonensis (Ludlow) 1905
- Orthopodomyia anopheloides (Giles) 1903
- Orthopodomyia flavithorax Barraud 1927
- Toxorhynchites minimus (Thoebald) 1905
- Toxorhynchites splendens (Wiedemann) 1819
- Tripteroides affinis (Edwards) 1913
- Tripteroides aranoides (Theobald) 1901
- Tripteroides dofleini (Gunther) 1913 - E
- Uranotaenia bicolor Leicester 1908
- Uranotaenia campestris Leicester 1908
- Uranotaenia lateralis Ludlow 1905
- Uranotaenia nivipleura Leicestor 1908
- Uranotaenia obscura Edwards 1915
- Uranotaenia rutherfordi Edwards 1922 - E
- Uranotaenia srilankensis Payton 1974 - E
- Verrallina spermathecus (Wijesundara 1951) (syn. Aedes spermathecus) - E
