= Aedes mariae =

Scientific classification
- Kingdom: Animalia
- Phylum: Arthropoda
- Class: Insecta
- Order: Diptera
- Family: Culicidae
- Genus: Aedes
- Species: A. mariae

Binomial name
- Aedes mariae (Sergent and Sergent, 1903)

Species of mosquito

Aedes mariae is a species and complex of mosquito in the genus Aedes. It has been found in rockpools on the Balearic Islands. Its habitat is limited to coastal puddles in rocks by the sea.

== Species complex ==
The A. mariae species complex contains the following species:

- Aedes mariae (Sergent & Sergent)
- Aedes zammitii (Theobald)
- Aedes phoeniciae (Coluzzi & Sabatini)

These species are known to hybridise.

== Pupae ==
A study found that pupae of A. mariae will dive less and for shorter amount of times in high salinity environments.
