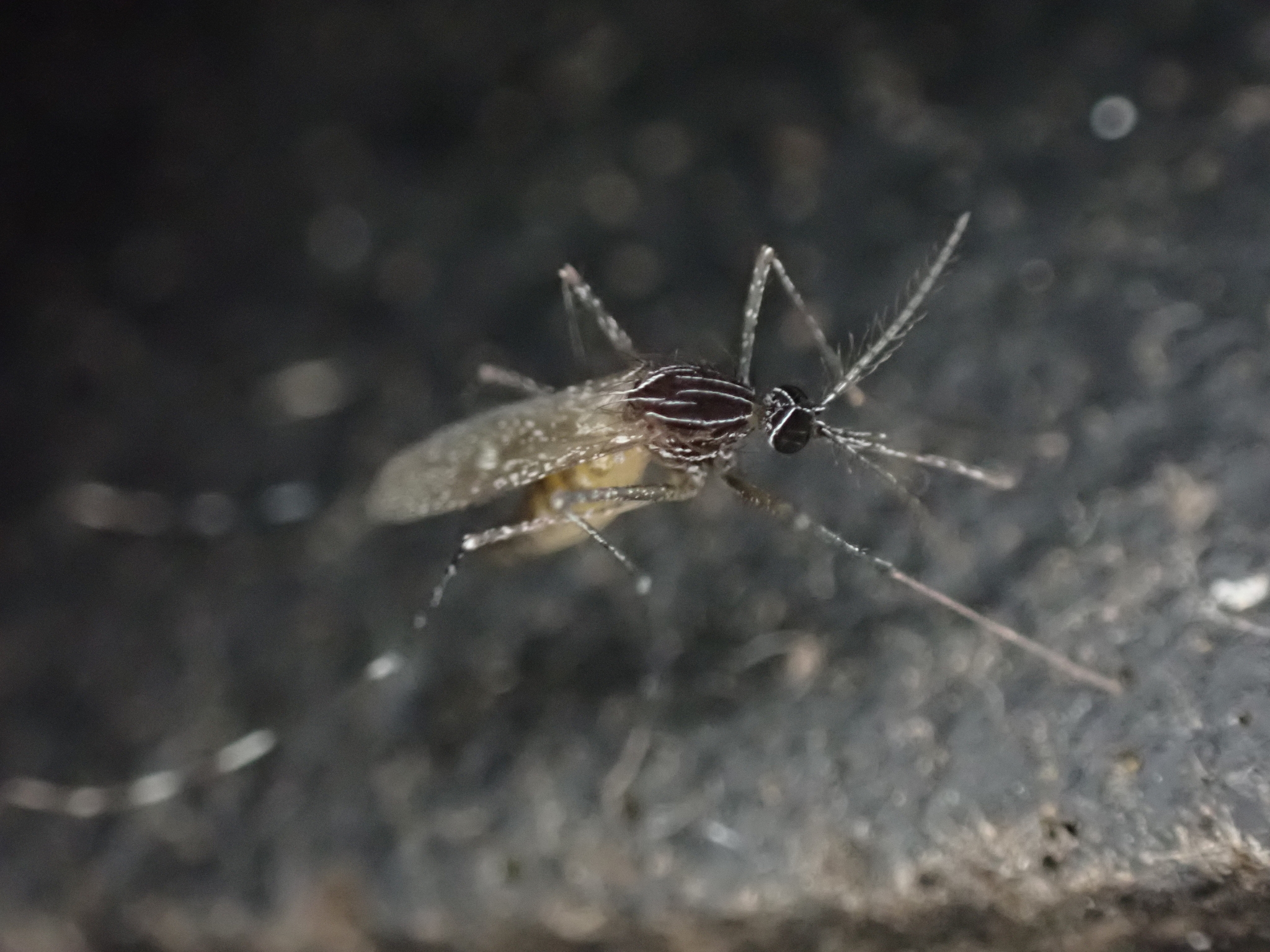
- Orthopodomyia signifera

Scientific classification
- Kingdom: Animalia
- Phylum: Arthropoda
- Class: Insecta
- Order: Diptera
- Family: Culicidae
- Subfamily: Culicinae
- Tribe: Orthopodomyiini; Belkin, 1962

Genera
- Orthopodomyia

= Orthopodomyiini =

Tribe of mosquitoes

Orthopodomyiini is a tribe of mosquitoes in the family Culicidae. The tribe is currently represented by a single genus, Orthopodomyia, whose members are commonly referred to as tree-hole or tree-hole mosquitoes.

== Biology and ecology ==
Immatures of Orthopodomyia are associated with phytotelmata (water held in tree holes and similar plant containers) and are commonly collected from tree holes and other small, shaded water bodies. Larvae and pupae are usually found in these natural containers rather than larger bodies of water, and adults are primarily forest- or woodland-associated. Members of this tribe are not known to bite people

== Distribution ==
Members of the genus (and thus the tribe) have a primarily tropical and warm-temperate distribution, with some species ranging as far North as Canada.

== Taxonomy and species ==
Orthopodomyia is treated as the sole genus of Orthopodomyiini. The number of valid described species in the genus has varied slightly among recent treatments; modern summaries place some 35 described species worldwide.
