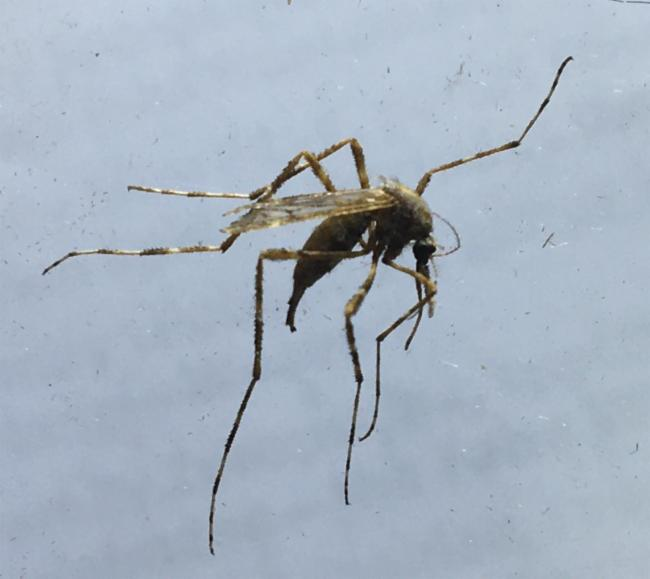

Scientific classification
- Kingdom: Animalia
- Phylum: Arthropoda
- Clade: Pancrustacea
- Class: Insecta
- Order: Diptera
- Family: Culicidae
- Genus: Aedes
- Subgenus: Mucidus
- Species: A. aurantius

Binomial name
- Aedes aurantius (Theobald, 1907)

= Aedes aurantius =

Species of mosquito

Aedes aurantius is mosquito species of the genus Aedes. This species is further divided into two subspecies: Aedes aurantius aurantius (Theobald, 1907) and Aedes aurantius chrysogaster (Taylor, 1927).

== Distribution ==
Aedes aurantius is primarily found in tropical and subtropical regions, consistent with the general distribution of the genus Aedes. Specific records indicate its presence in regions such as Singapore, where it has been documented as part of the local mosquito fauna, but has also been found in Australia.
