= Aedes daliensis =

Scientific classification
- Kingdom: Animalia
- Phylum: Arthropoda
- Class: Insecta
- Order: Diptera
- Family: Culicidae
- Genus: Aedes
- Species: A. daliensis

Binomial name
- Aedes daliensis (Taylor, 1916)

Synonyms
- Stegomyia daliensis

Species of mosquito

Aedes daliensis is a species of mosquito within the genus Aedes which is found in the Northern Territory and Western Australia. It breeds in crab holes, and is found in or near mangroves.

== Description ==
The head of adult female A. daliensis is pale scaled, with upright, forked, black scales on the vertex. Antennae are dark brown, while the palps and proboscis are black. The thorax is with dark brown integument, abdomen black. Coxae and trochanters pale with dark bristles. The basal half of the femora are pale while the rest of them and that of the tarsi and tibiae are mostly dark. In total, the adults are around 4 millimeters in length.

== Larvae ==
Larvae of A. daliensis are easily disturbed, diving downwards when they feel so. Found in flooded crab holes, they use their pleural setae to anchor themselves to the edges. Adults do not disperse far from where they hatch.

Antennae brown, just over half the length of the head.
