= Aedes (Coetzeemyia) =

Scientific classification
- Kingdom: Animalia
- Phylum: Arthropoda
- Clade: Pancrustacea
- Class: Insecta
- Order: Diptera
- Family: Culicidae
- Genus: Aedes
- Subgenus: Coetzeemyia

Type species
- Aedes fryeri

Species
- Aedes fryeri

Subgenus of mosquitoes

Aedes (Coetzeemyia) is a subgenus of the genus of mosquitoes, Aedes. It is characterised through the scaleless spiracles. The type species of this subgenus is Aedes fryeri.
