= Aedes ashworthi =

Scientific classification
- Kingdom: Animalia
- Phylum: Arthropoda
- Clade: Pancrustacea
- Class: Insecta
- Order: Diptera
- Family: Culicidae
- Genus: Aedes
- Subgenus: Halaedes
- Species: A. ashworthi

Binomial name
- Aedes ashworthi (Erichson, 1842)

Species of mosquito

Aedes (Halaedes) ashworthi is a species of mosquito in the genus Aedes. It is found in Western Australia, and is strictly coastal, breeding in hypersaline rock pools. They are known to bite humans.
