= Aedes occidentalis =

Scientific classification
- Kingdom: Animalia
- Phylum: Arthropoda
- Clade: Pancrustacea
- Class: Insecta
- Order: Diptera
- Family: Culicidae
- Genus: Aedes
- Subgenus: Dobrotworskyius
- Species: A. occidentalis

Binomial name
- Aedes occidentalis (Skuse, 1889)

Species of mosquito

Aedes (Dobrotworskyius) occidentalis is a species of mosquito in the genus Aedes. It breeds in rain-filled depressions on granite outcrops in southern Western Australia, mainly inland.
