= Aedes calabyi =

Scientific classification
- Kingdom: Animalia
- Phylum: Arthropoda
- Clade: Pancrustacea
- Class: Insecta
- Order: Diptera
- Family: Culicidae
- Genus: Aedes
- Species: A. calabyi

Binomial name
- Aedes calabyi (Marks, 1963)

Species of mosquito

Aedes (Macleaya) calabyi is a species of mosquito in the genus Aedes. It is small and dark, and a relatively rare species. Adults can be identified as they are the only species of Aedes in its distribution that have gold and white scales on the anterior part of its scutum.

It feeds in the afternoon and at dusk.

Aedes calabyi was first described by the Australian entomologist Elizabeth N. Marks in 1963. The species is endemic to Australia.

== Distribution ==
A. calabyi is found in the arid zones of southern Western Australia, in mallee and sclerophyll woodlands.
