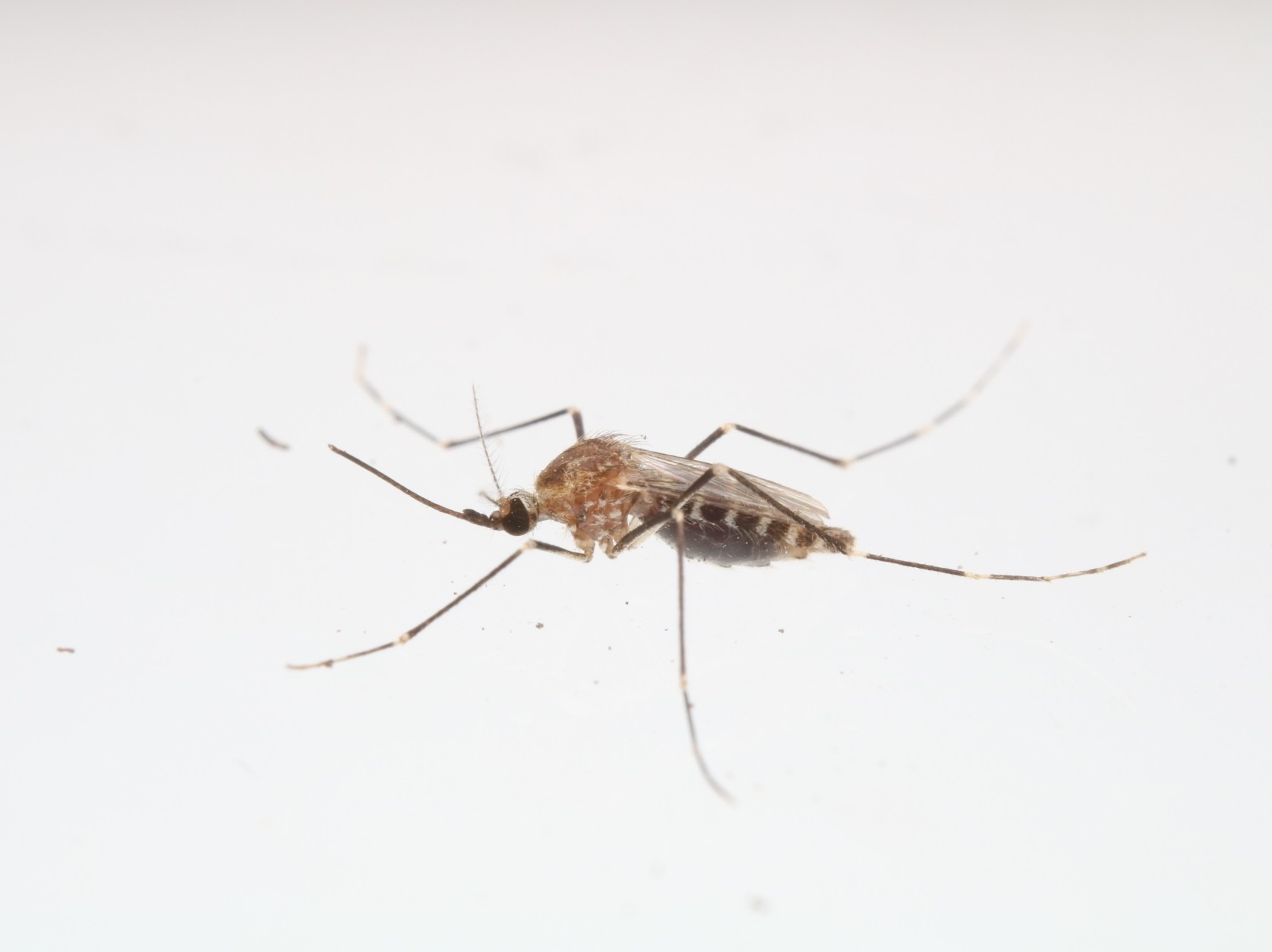

Scientific classification
- Kingdom: Animalia
- Phylum: Arthropoda
- Clade: Pancrustacea
- Class: Insecta
- Order: Diptera
- Family: Culicidae
- Genus: Aedes
- Subgenus: Georgecraigius
- Species: A. epactius

Binomial name
- Aedes epactius Dyer & Knab, 1908

Synonyms
- Aedes atropalpus nielseni Brust, 1974; Aedes atropalpus perichares O'Meara and Craig, 1970a

= Aedes epactius =

Species of fly

Aedes epactius is a species of mosquito (Culicidae) native to North America.

== Diet ==
Like other mosquito species, female Aedes epactius take blood meal to develop their eggs. Apart from blood-feeding, they feed on nectar and other sweet plant juices.
