= Aedes reginae =

Scientific classification
- Kingdom: Animalia
- Phylum: Arthropoda
- Clade: Pancrustacea
- Class: Insecta
- Order: Diptera
- Family: Culicidae
- Genus: Aedes
- Subgenus: Dendroskusea
- Species: A. reginae

Binomial name
- Aedes reginae Edwards, 1922

Species of mosquito

Aedes reginae is a species of mosquito in the subfamily Culicinae. It is found in Sri Lanka and India.
