= Aedes wardi =

Scientific classification
- Kingdom: Animalia
- Phylum: Arthropoda
- Class: Insecta
- Order: Diptera
- Family: Culicidae
- Genus: Aedes
- Subgenus: Rhinoskusea
- Species: A. wardi

Binomial name
- Aedes wardi Reinert, 1976

Species of mosquito

Aedes (Rhinoskusea) wardi is a species complex of zoophilic mosquito belonging to the genus Aedes. It is found in Sri Lanka, Malaysia, Philippines and Indonesia.
