= Tripteroides atripes =

Scientific classification
- Kingdom: Animalia
- Phylum: Arthropoda
- Clade: Pancrustacea
- Class: Insecta
- Order: Diptera
- Family: Culicidae
- Genus: Tripteroides
- Species: T. atripes

Binomial name
- Tripteroides atripes (Skuse, 1889)

Species of mosquito

Tripteroides atripes is a species of mosquito in the genus Tripteroides. Larvae can be found in tree holes and artificial containers such as rainwater tanks. Adults may bite man, and are never found in large numbers.

== Description ==
T. atripes is a small, drab species at about 3.81 mm in length. The head clothed with dark scales, and a narrow white border around the eye. Palps are very short, about 0.08x the length of the black proboscis, which in turn is approximately the same length as the forefemur. Scutum dark brown, small pale lateral band above the wing root. Tergites are a dark brown or black with apicolateral white triangular patches. Wings are with dark scales.
