= Aedes alboscutellatus =

Scientific classification
- Kingdom: Animalia
- Phylum: Arthropoda
- Clade: Pancrustacea
- Class: Insecta
- Order: Diptera
- Family: Culicidae
- Genus: Aedes
- Subgenus: Aedimorphus
- Species: A. alboscutellatus

Binomial name
- Aedes alboscutellatus (Theobald, 1908)

Synonyms
- Aedes argentinotus Banks, 1909; Aedes omurensis Yamada, 1921

Species of insect

Aedes (Aedimorphus) alboscutellatus is a species of zoophilic mosquito belonging to the genus Aedes. It is a member of Aedes niveus subgroup. It is found in Sri Lanka, and the Korean peninsula. It is one of the most common indoor human biting mosquitoes in the world with peak biting at 20:00-22:00 and 04:00-06:00 hours.

== Description ==
Aedes alboscutellatus is a medium-sized black mosquito. Scutum with white scales and narrow scales are dark bronze in color. All femurs have characteristic sub-apical band. Proboscis mottled. Wings dark scaled. Adults are closely associated with exposed or partially sun lit forests and temporarily water filled pools in rainy seasons. Larva can be found in shallow pools of natural and man-made structures, both indoor and outdoor.
