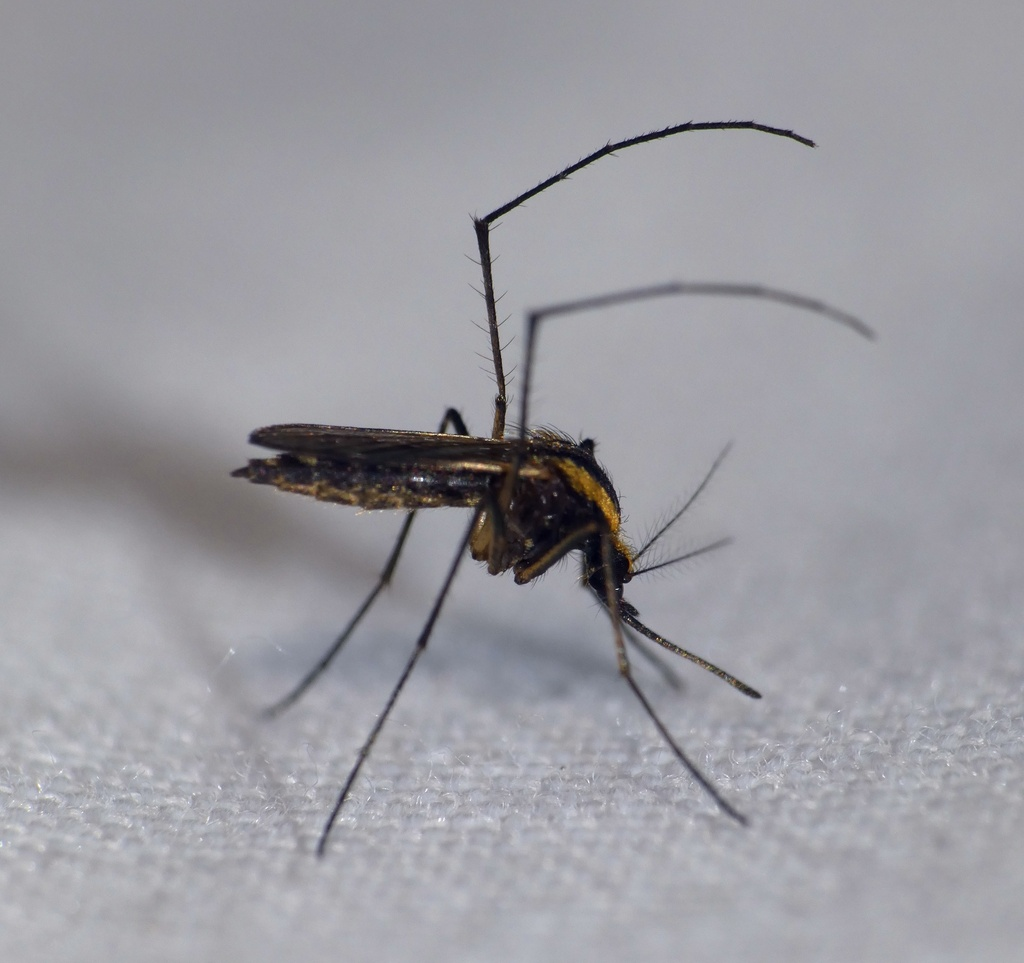

Scientific classification
- Kingdom: Animalia
- Phylum: Arthropoda
- Clade: Pancrustacea
- Class: Insecta
- Order: Diptera
- Family: Culicidae
- Genus: Aedes
- Subgenus: Neomelaniconion
- Species: A. lineatopennis

Binomial name
- Aedes lineatopennis (Ludlow, 1905)

Synonyms
- Pseudohowardina linealis Taylor, 1913

= Aedes lineatopennis =

Species of mosquito

Aedes (Neomelaniconion) lineatopennis is a species complex of zoophilic mosquito belonging to the genus Aedes. It is found in Oriental Regions such as India, Sri Lanka, and also in Eastern & Southern Africa, Nigeria, Japan, South Korea, Malaysia, and Australia. Female has a wing length of 4 to 5mm. Head scales golden, curved and narrow. Male with tentacles over long beak, distal with wool.

== Reproduction ==
Female breeds in transient, rain-filled grass pools. The egg of the species are boat-shaped, with fragmented micropylar collar, and membrane-like wall enclosing many tubercles of exo-chorionic sculpture.

== Hosts ==
Female is a typical zoophilic mostly suck blood from mammals, including domestic cattle, Asian water buffalo, domestic dog, domestic sheep, domestic goat and also humans. In addition to mammals, they are also known to attack poultry. It is a secondary vector of Rift Valley fever virus.
