= Tripteroides sp. No. 2 =

Scientific classification
- Kingdom: Animalia
- Phylum: Arthropoda
- Class: Insecta
- Order: Diptera
- Family: Culicidae
- Genus: Tripteroides
- Species: T. sp. No. 2

Binomial name
- Tripteroides sp. No. 2

Species of fly

Tripteroides sp. No. 2 is a species of mosquito in the genus Tripteroides which has not yet been formally named. It is endemic to Sabah, Malaysian Borneo. T. sp. No. 2 is placed in the subgenus Rachionotomyia. In its larval stage, T. sp. No. 2 develops in the pitchers of Nepenthes species, especially N. rajah. As such, it is considered a nepenthebiont.
