= Verrallina srilankensis =

Scientific classification
- Kingdom: Animalia
- Phylum: Arthropoda
- Clade: Pancrustacea
- Class: Insecta
- Order: Diptera
- Family: Culicidae
- Genus: Verrallina
- Species: V. srilankensis

Binomial name
- Verrallina srilankensis Reinert, 1999

Synonyms
- Aedes srilankensis (Reinert, 1977)

Species of fly

Verrallina (Harbachius) srilankensis, or Aedes srilankensis, is a species complex of zoophilic mosquito belonging to the genus Aedes. It is endemic to Sri Lanka.
