= Verrallina seculata =

Scientific classification
- Kingdom: Animalia
- Phylum: Arthropoda
- Clade: Pancrustacea
- Class: Insecta
- Order: Diptera
- Family: Culicidae
- Genus: Aedes
- Species: A. seculatus

Binomial name
- Aedes seculatus Menon, 1950

Synonyms
- Aedes (Aedes) carteri (Wijesundara, 1951)

Species of fly

Aedes (Verrallina) seculatus is a species complex of zoophilic mosquito belonging to the genus Aedes. It is found in Sri Lanka.
