= Aedes thomsoni =

Scientific classification
- Kingdom: Animalia
- Phylum: Arthropoda
- Class: Insecta
- Order: Diptera
- Family: Culicidae
- Genus: Aedes
- Subgenus: Christophersiomyia
- Species: A. thomsoni

Binomial name
- Aedes thomsoni (Theobald, 1905)

Species of mosquito

Aedes (Christophersiomyia) thomsoni is a species complex of zoophilic mosquito belonging to the genus Aedes. It is found in Sri Lanka and India.
