= Aedes albolateralis =

Scientific classification
- Kingdom: Animalia
- Phylum: Arthropoda
- Clade: Pancrustacea
- Class: Insecta
- Order: Diptera
- Family: Culicidae
- Genus: Aedes
- Subgenus: Downsiomyia
- Species: A. albolateralis

Binomial name
- Aedes albolateralis (Theobald, 1908)

Species of mosquito

Aedes (Downsiomyia) albolateralis is a species of zoophilic mosquito belonging to the genus Aedes. It is a member in Aedes niveus subgroup. It is found in Sri Lanka, Indonesia, Malaysia, Thailand, Andaman Islands, China, India, Borneo and Singapore. It is highly susceptible to nocturnally subperiodic Wuchereria bancrofti and dengue type 2 virus. Virus could replicate in salivary gland, cervical cell of brain and fat body cells but not in gut and ovary.
