= Aedes albotaeniatus =

Scientific classification
- Kingdom: Animalia
- Phylum: Arthropoda
- Class: Insecta
- Order: Diptera
- Family: Culicidae
- Genus: Aedes
- Subgenus: Danielsia
- Species: A. albotaeniatus

Binomial name
- Aedes albotaeniatus (Leicester, 1904)

Synonyms
- Aedes mikiranus Edwards, 1922

Species of mosquito

Aedes (Danielsia) albotaeniatus is a species complex of zoophilic mosquito belonging to the genus Aedes. It is found in Sri Lanka, India, Malaya, and Sumatra.
