= Verrallina petroelephantus =

Scientific classification
- Kingdom: Animalia
- Phylum: Arthropoda
- Clade: Pancrustacea
- Class: Insecta
- Order: Diptera
- Family: Culicidae
- Genus: Aedes
- Species: A. petroelephantus

Binomial name
- Aedes petroelephantus Wijesundara, 1951

Species of fly

Aedes (Neomacleaya) petroelephantus, or Verrallina (Neomacleaya) petroelephantus, is a species complex of zoophilic mosquito belonging to the genus Aedes. It is endemic to Sri Lanka
