= Aedes phoeniciae =

Scientific classification
- Kingdom: Animalia
- Phylum: Arthropoda
- Class: Insecta
- Order: Diptera
- Family: Culicidae
- Genus: Aedes
- Species: A. phoeniciae

Binomial name
- Aedes phoeniciae (Coluzzi and Sabatini, 1968)

Species of mosquito

Aedes phoeniciae is a species of mosquito in the genus Aedes. It is found in coastal rock pools in the southeastern Mediterranean Sea.

As a vector for disease, A. phoeniciae may be responsible for avian malaria, being a carrier of Plasmodium relictum. It is also known to bite humans.
