= Aedes gubernatoris =

Scientific classification
- Kingdom: Animalia
- Phylum: Arthropoda
- Class: Insecta
- Order: Diptera
- Family: Culicidae
- Genus: Aedes
- Subgenus: Phagomyia
- Species: A. gubernatoris

Binomial name
- Aedes gubernatoris (Giles, 1901)

Synonyms
- Aedes kotiensis Barraud, 1934; Lepidotomyia magna Theobald, 1905

Species of mosquito

Aedes (Phagomyia) gubernatoris is a species complex of zoophilic mosquito belonging to the genus Aedes. It is found in India, Sri Lanka, Bangladesh, China, Nepal and Thailand. Two subspecies described - A. g. kotiensis and A. g. gubernatoris.
