= Aedes greenii =

Scientific classification
- Kingdom: Animalia
- Phylum: Arthropoda
- Clade: Pancrustacea
- Class: Insecta
- Order: Diptera
- Family: Culicidae
- Genus: Aedes
- Subgenus: Bruceharrisonius
- Species: A. greenii

Binomial name
- Aedes greenii (Theobald, 1903)

Synonyms
- Aedes kanaranus Barraud

Species of mosquito

Aedes (Bruceharrisonius) greenii is a species complex of zoophilic mosquito belonging to the genus Aedes. It is found in Sri Lanka India, Indonesia, Malaysia, Nepal, Philippines and Thailand.
