= Aedes annulirostris =

Scientific classification
- Kingdom: Animalia
- Phylum: Arthropoda
- Class: Insecta
- Order: Diptera
- Family: Culicidae
- Genus: Aedes
- Subgenus: Christophersiomyia
- Species: A. annulirostris

Binomial name
- Aedes annulirostris (Theobald, 1905)

Synonyms
- Stegomyia annulirostris

Species of mosquito

Aedes annulirostris is a species complex of zoophilic mosquito belonging to the genus Aedes. It is found in Sri Lanka, India, and Nepal.
