= Aedes taeniorhynchoides =

Scientific classification
- Kingdom: Animalia
- Phylum: Arthropoda
- Class: Insecta
- Order: Diptera
- Family: Culicidae
- Genus: Aedes
- Subgenus: Aedimorphus
- Species: A. taeniorhynchoides

Binomial name
- Aedes taeniorhynchoides Christophers, 1911

Species of mosquito

Aedes (Aedimorphus) taeniorhynchoides is a species complex of zoophilic mosquito belonging to the genus Aedes. It is found in Sri Lanka.
