= Aedes simplex =

Scientific classification
- Kingdom: Animalia
- Phylum: Arthropoda
- Class: Insecta
- Order: Diptera
- Family: Culicidae
- Genus: Aedes
- Subgenus: Cancraedes
- Species: A. simplex

Binomial name
- Aedes simplex (Theobald, 1907)

Species of mosquito

Aedes simplex is a species complex of zoophilic mosquito belonging to the genus Aedes. It is endemic to Sri Lanka.
