= Aedes pipersalatus =

Scientific classification
- Kingdom: Animalia
- Phylum: Arthropoda
- Clade: Pancrustacea
- Class: Insecta
- Order: Diptera
- Family: Culicidae
- Genus: Aedes
- Subgenus: Aedimorphus
- Species: A. pipersalatus

Binomial name
- Aedes pipersalatus (Giles, 1902)

Synonyms
- Pseudograbhamia maculata Theobald, 1905

Species of mosquito

Aedes pipersalatus is a species complex of mosquito belonging to the genus Aedes. It is found in Sri Lanka, Cambodia, West Pakistan, India, and Thailand. It is a non-vector mosquito species, that can be found from rice field and marshland habitats.
