= Aedes scatophagoides =

Scientific classification
- Kingdom: Animalia
- Phylum: Arthropoda
- Class: Insecta
- Order: Diptera
- Family: Culicidae
- Genus: Aedes
- Subgenus: Mucidus
- Species: A. scatophagoides

Binomial name
- Aedes scatophagoides (Theobald, 1901)

Species of mosquito

Aedes scatophagoides is a species complex of zoophilic mosquito belonging to the Mucidus group of the genus Aedes.

== Distribution ==
It has a wide range of distribution from west to east of the globe. These include Sri Lanka, Myanmar, China, South Vietnam, India, Western Pakistan, Tanzania, Mali, Mauritania, Mozambique, Senegal, Thailand, Gabon, and Ghana.

== Description ==
Wings are about 5.5 to 6.5 mm in length. Adult has a medial white band on the first tarsomere. White scales present on the proboscis. Male is differ from all other Mucidus group species by torus without scales. Antenna light to dark brown. Yellow scales are with dark tips. No white ring can be seen at apex. Color of labellum ranges from light to dark brown. Erect scales are white and dark. Legs are brown, with numerous white rings.

In Tanzania, these wild-biting mosquitoes can be effectively controlled by using repellents such as Zero Bite, X-pel, and No Bite. They are found in natural broad-leaf tropical and subtropical forests and man-made places, where they breed in freshwater ponds and ditches. They are non-vector mosquitoes.
