= Aedes jamesi =

Scientific classification
- Kingdom: Animalia
- Phylum: Arthropoda
- Clade: Pancrustacea
- Class: Insecta
- Order: Diptera
- Family: Culicidae
- Genus: Aedes
- Subgenus: Aedimorphus
- Species: A. jamesi

Binomial name
- Aedes jamesi (Edwards, 1914)

Synonyms
- Ochlerotatus jamesi Edwards, 1914; Aedimorphus jamesi (Edwards, 1914)

Species of mosquito

Aedes (Aedimorphus) jamesi is a species of zoophilic mosquito in the subfamily Culicinae. It is found in India and Sri Lanka.
