= Aedes ramachandrai =

Scientific classification
- Kingdom: Animalia
- Phylum: Arthropoda
- Class: Insecta
- Order: Diptera
- Family: Culicidae
- Genus: Aedes
- Subgenus: Dendroskusea
- Species: A. ramachandrai

Binomial name
- Aedes ramachandrai Reuben, 1967

Species of mosquito

Aedes (Dendroskusea) ramachandrai is a species complex of zoophilic mosquito belonging to the genus Aedes. It is known to be endemic to India, but some texts found it in Sri Lanka as well.
