= Aedes ostentatio =

Scientific classification
- Kingdom: Animalia
- Phylum: Arthropoda
- Class: Insecta
- Order: Diptera
- Family: Culicidae
- Genus: Aedes
- Subgenus: Paraedes
- Species: A. ostentatio

Binomial name
- Aedes ostentatio (Leicester, 1908)

Species of mosquito

Aedes (Paraedes) ostentatio is a species complex of zoophilic mosquito belonging to the genus Aedes. It is found in Sri Lanka, Malay, India, Indochina, Indonesia, Philippines, Laos, Thailand, Vietnam and Maluku.
