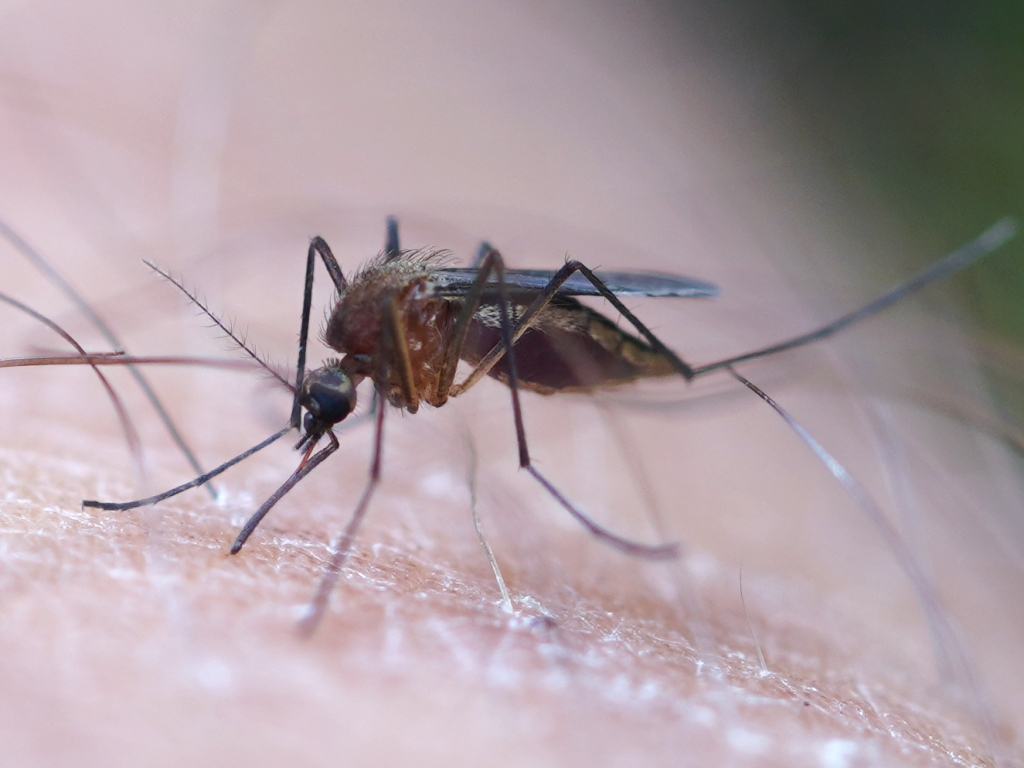

Scientific classification
- Kingdom: Animalia
- Phylum: Arthropoda
- Clade: Pancrustacea
- Class: Insecta
- Order: Diptera
- Family: Culicidae
- Genus: Aedes
- Subgenus: Aedes
- Species: A. cinereus

Binomial name
- Aedes cinereus (Meigen), 1818

= Aedes cinereus =

Species of fly

Aedes cinereus is a mosquito species in the genus Aedes.

== Distribution ==
The common range Aedes cinereus is in North America and Europe. Covering most of Canada, Alaska and Northern United States, and European counties of Belgium, Estonia, Germany, Ireland, Netherlands, Norway, Sweden and the United Kingdom.

== Description ==
Aedes cinereus is a small mosquito species with a Holarctic distribution, found widely across North America, Europe, and northern Asia.
