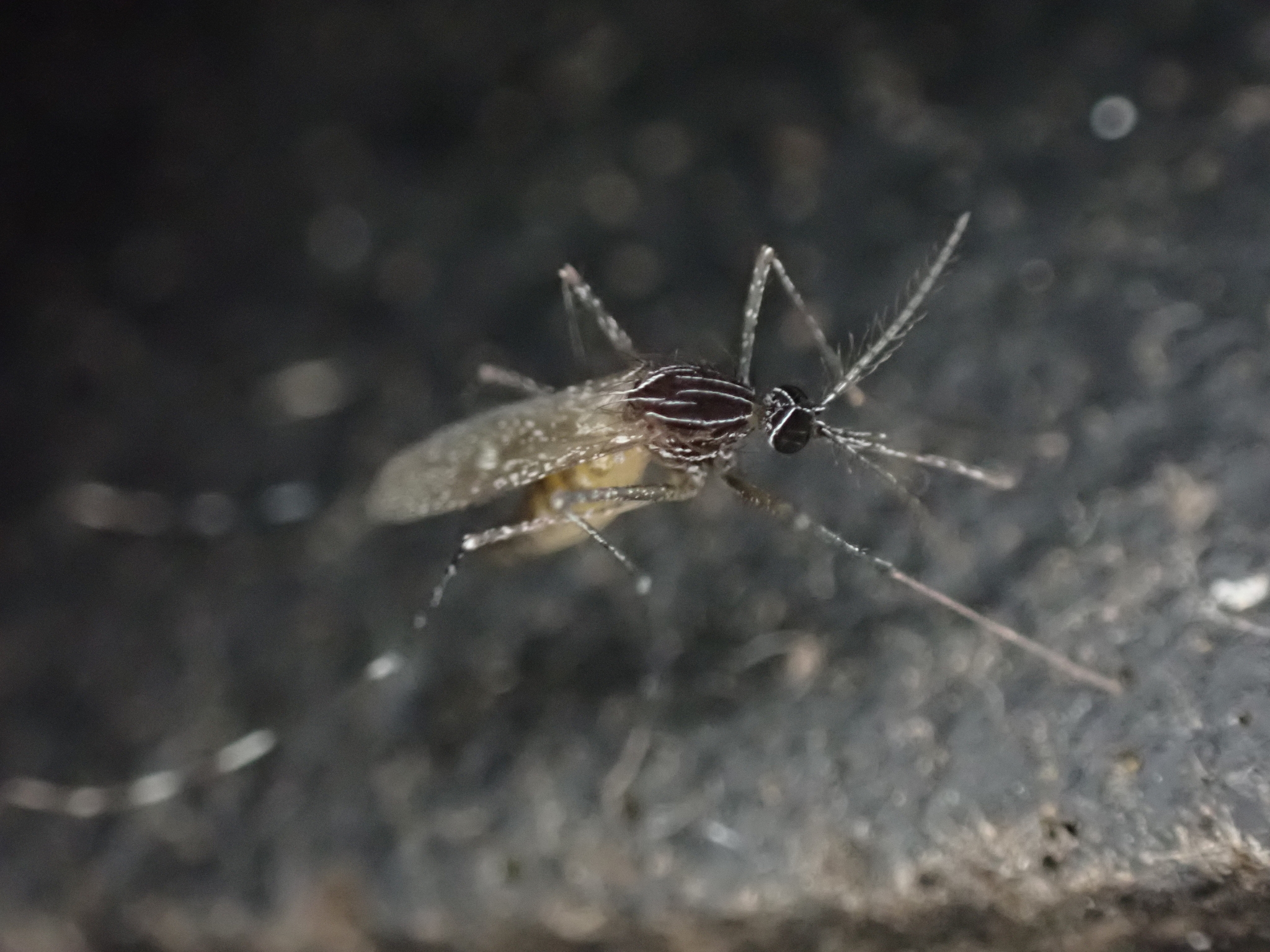
- Orthopodomyia signifera

Scientific classification
- Kingdom: Animalia
- Phylum: Arthropoda
- Class: Insecta
- Order: Diptera
- Family: Culicidae
- Subfamily: Culicinae
- Tribe: Orthopodomyiini
- Genus: Orthopodomyia; Theobald, 1904

= Orthopodomyia =

Genus of flies

Orthopodomyia is a genus of mosquitoes in the family Culicidae. There are at least 40 described species in Orthopodomyia.

== Species ==
These 40 species belong to the genus Orthopodomyia:

- Orthopodomyia alba Baker, 1936
- Orthopodomyia albicosta (Lutz, 1904)
- Orthopodomyia albionensis MacGregor, 1919
- Orthopodomyia albipes (Giles, 1904)
- Orthopodomyia ambremontis Brunhes & Hervy, 1995
- Orthopodomyia andamanensis Barraud, 1934
- Orthopodomyia ankaratrensis Brunhes & Hervy, 1995
- Orthopodomyia anopheloides (Giles, 1903)
- Orthopodomyia antanosyorum Rodhain & Boutonnier, 1984
- Orthopodomyia arboricollis (Charmoy, 1908)
- Orthopodomyia aureoantennata Ferrara, 1973
- Orthopodomyia comorensis Brunhes, 1977
- Orthopodomyia fascipes (Coquillett, 1906)
- Orthopodomyia flavicosta (Barraud, 1927)
- Orthopodomyia flavithorax (Barraud, 1927)
- Orthopodomyia fontenillei Brunhes & Hervy, 1995
- Orthopodomyia geberti Grjebine, 1953
- Orthopodomyia joyoni Brunhes, 1977
- Orthopodomyia kummi Edwards, 1939
- Orthopodomyia lanyuensis Lien, 1968
- Orthopodomyia madecassorum Rodhain & Boutonnier, 1984
- Orthopodomyia madrensis Baisas, 1946
- Orthopodomyia mcgregori (Banks, 1909)
- Orthopodomyia milloti Doucet, 1951
- Orthopodomyia nkolbissonensis Rickenback & Hamon, 1965
- Orthopodomyia papuensis Zavortink, 1968
- Orthopodomyia peytoni Leguizamon & Carpintero, 2004
- Orthopodomyia phyllozoa (Dyar & Knab, 1907)
- Orthopodomyia pulcripalpis (Rondani, 1872)
- Orthopodomyia rajaonariveloi Brunhes & Hervy, 1995
- Orthopodomyia ravaonjanaharyi Brunhes & Hervy, 1995
- Orthopodomyia reunionensis Brunhes & Hervy, 1995
- Orthopodomyia rodhaini Brunhes & Hervy, 1995
- Orthopodomyia sampaioi Lima, 1935
- Orthopodomyia siamensis Zavortink, 1968
- Orthopodomyia signifera (Coquillett, 1896)
- Orthopodomyia vernoni Someren, 1949
- Orthopodomyia wanxianensis Lei, 1991
- Orthopodomyia waverleyi (Grabham, 1907)
- Orthopodomyia wilsoni Macdonald, 1958
