= Aedes macdougalli =

Scientific classification
- Kingdom: Animalia
- Phylum: Arthropoda
- Class: Insecta
- Order: Diptera
- Family: Culicidae
- Genus: Aedes
- Subgenus: Collessius
- Species: A. macdougalli

Binomial name
- Aedes macdougalli Edwards, 1922

Species of mosquito

Aedes (Collessius) macdougalli is a species complex of zoophilic mosquito belonging to the genus Aedes. It is found in Sri Lanka, India, China, and Sumatra.
