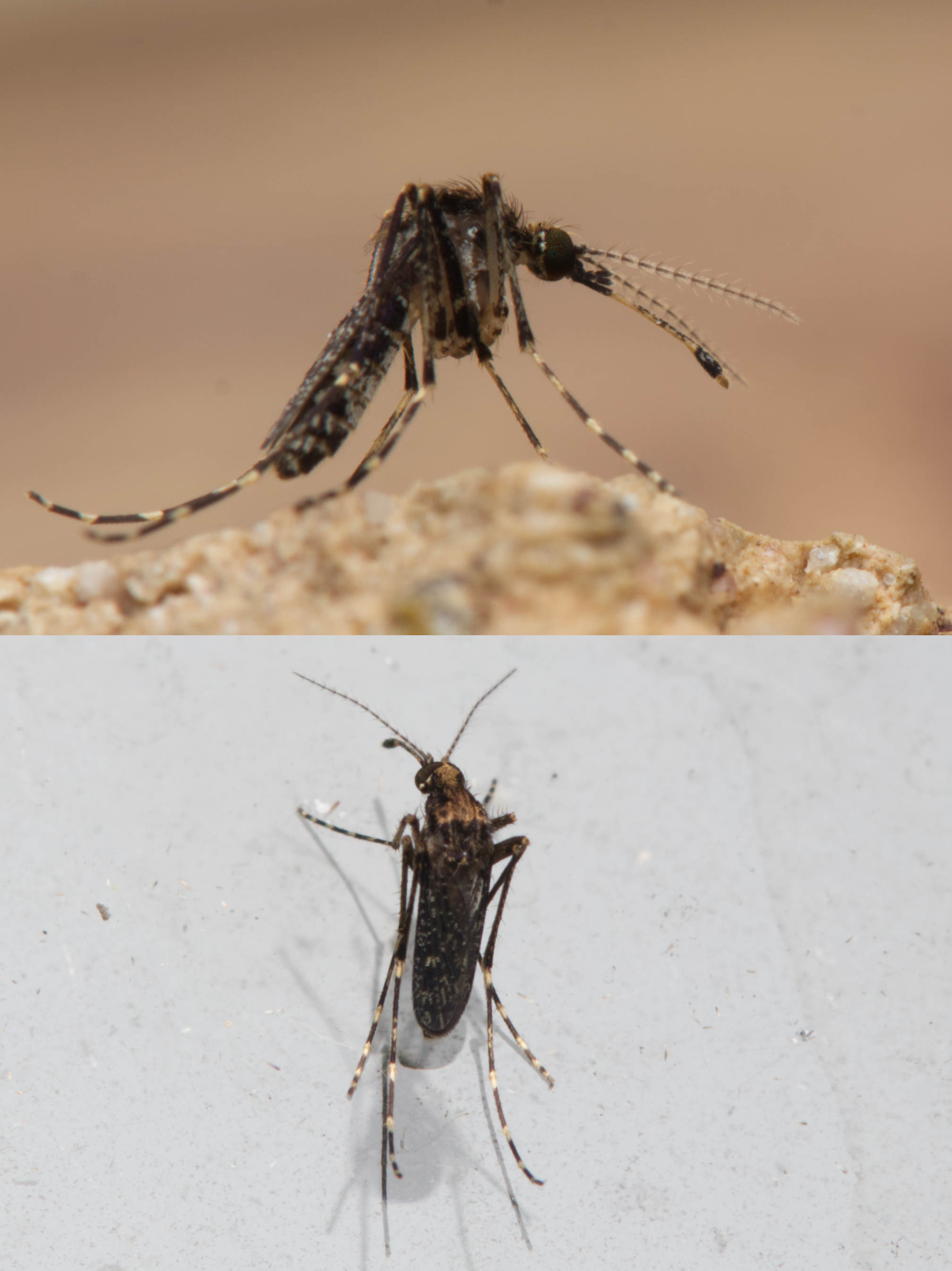
- Minomyia elegans

Scientific classification
- Kingdom: Animalia
- Phylum: Arthropoda
- Class: Insecta
- Order: Diptera
- Family: Culicidae
- Subfamily: Culicinae
- Tribe: Ficalbiini
- Genus: Mimomyia; Theobald, 1903

= Mimomyia =

Genus of mosquitoes

Mimomyia is a genus of mosquitoes that belongs to the family Culicidae. Mimomyia has 45 species and 3 subgenera, the species can be found in the Australasian, Oriental, and Afrotropical regions, as well as Madagascar and surrounding islands.

== Species ==
=== Subgenus (Mimomyia) ===
- Mimomyia aurea Leicester, 1908
- Mimomyia chamberlaini Ludlow, 1904
- Mimomyia femorata Edwards, 1936
- Mimomyia flavens King and Hoogstraal, 1946
- Mimomyia flavopicta Edwards, 1936
- Mimomyia gurneyi Belkin, 1962
- Mimomyia hispida Theobald, 1910
- Mimomyia hybrida Leicester, 1908
- Mimomyia intermedia Barraud, 1929
- Mimomyia lacustris Edwards, 1935
- Mimomyia mimomyiaformis Newstead, 1907
- Mimomyia modesta King and Hoogstraal, 1946
- Mimomyia pallida Edwards, 1925
- Mimomyia parenti de Meillon and Lavoipierre, 1944
- Mimomyia perplexens Edwards, 1932
- Mimomyia plumosa Theobald, 1901
- Mimomyia splendens Theobald, 1903

=== Subgenus (Etorleptiomyia) ===
- Mimomyia bougainvillensis Belkin, 1962
- Mimomyia elegans Taylor, 1914
- Mimomyia luzonensis Ludlow, 1905
- Mimomyia martinei Doucet, 1951
- Mimomyia mediolineata Theobald, 1904
- Mimomyia solomonis Belkin, 1962
- Mimomyia xanthozona van Someren, 1948

=== Subgenus (Ingramia) ===
- Mimomyia aurata Doucet, 1951
- Mimomyia bernardi Doucet, 1950
- Mimomyia beytouti Doucet, 1951
- Mimomyia bry.gooi Grjebine, 1986
- Mimomyia collessi Grjebine, 1986
- Mimomyia deguzmanae Mattingly, 1957
- Mimomyia fusca Leicester, 1908
- Mimomyia grjebinei Brunhes, 1977
- Mimomyia jeansottei Doucet, 1950
- Mimomyia kiriromi Klein, 1969
- Mimomyia levicastilloi Grjebine, 1986
- Mimomyia longicornis Grjebine, 1986
- Mimomyia marksae Grjebine, 1986
- Mimomyia mattinglyi Grjebine, 1986
- Mimomyia milloti Grjebine, 1986
- Mimomyia mogii Miyagi, Toma and Higa, 2004
- Mimomyia ramalai Grjebine, 1986
- Mimomyia roubaudi Doucet, 1950
- Mimomyia spinosa Doucet, 1951
- Mimomyia stellata Grjebine, 1986
- Mimomyia vansomerenae Grjebine, 1986
