= Verrallina butleri =

Scientific classification
- Kingdom: Animalia
- Phylum: Arthropoda
- Class: Insecta
- Order: Diptera
- Family: Culicidae
- Genus: Aedes
- Species: A. butleri

Binomial name
- Aedes butleri Theobald, 1901

Species of fly

Verrallina butleri is a species of zoophilic mosquito belonging to the genus Aedes. It is found in Sri Lanka Malaysia, Singapore, Java, Borneo, Philippines, Indochina, Thailand, and Maluku.
