= Verrallina ceylonica =

Scientific classification
- Kingdom: Animalia
- Phylum: Arthropoda
- Clade: Pancrustacea
- Class: Insecta
- Order: Diptera
- Family: Culicidae
- Genus: Verrallina
- Species: V. lankaensis

Binomial name
- Verrallina lankaensis Reinert, 1999

Synonyms
- Aedes ceylonicus Edwards, 1917; Aedes lankaensis Stone & Knight, 1958

Species of fly

Verrallina (Neomacleaya) lankaensis, or Aedes lankaensis, is a species complex of zoophilic mosquito belonging to the genus Aedes. It is endemic to Sri Lanka.
