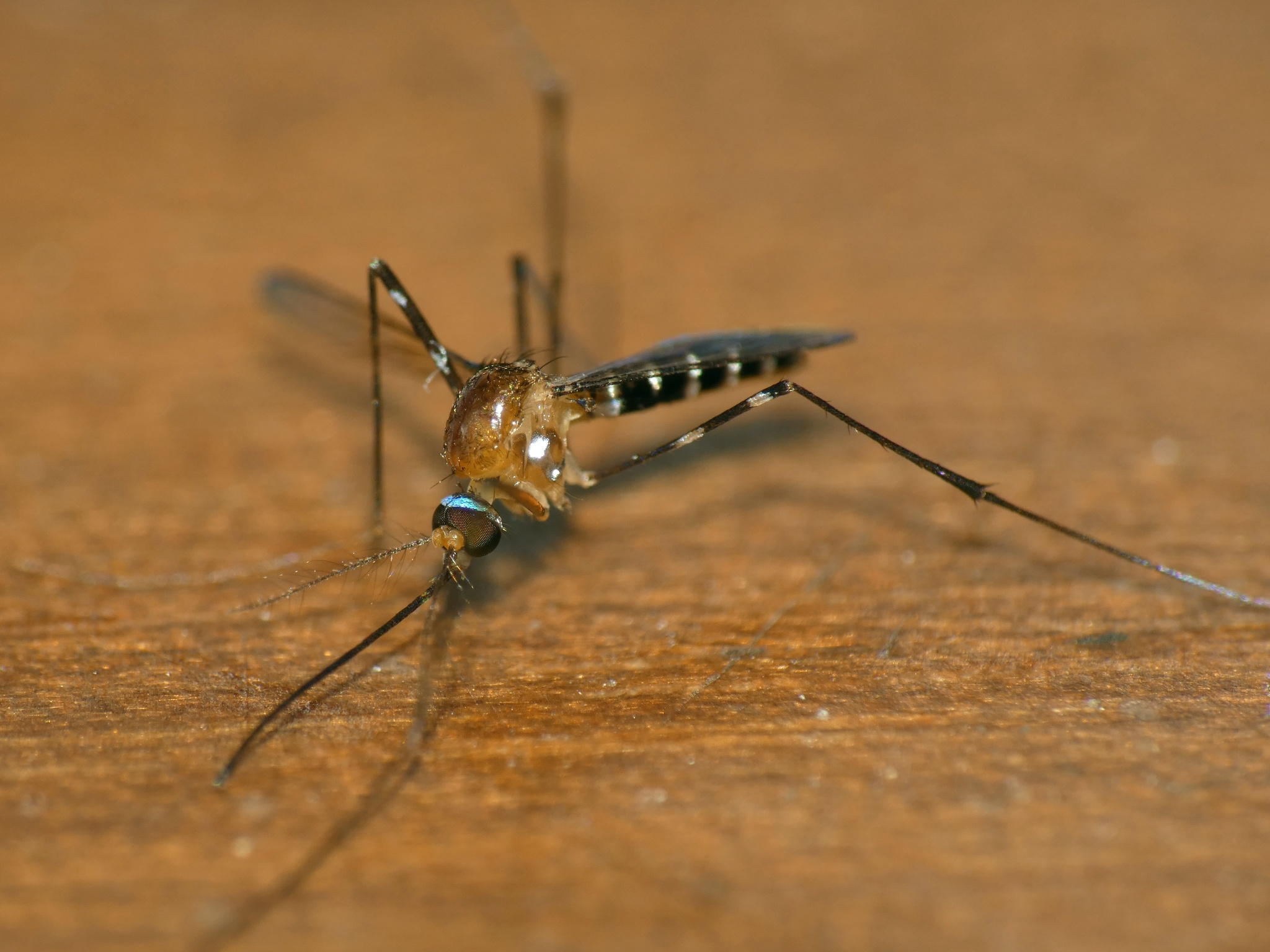
- Tripteroides magnesianus

Scientific classification
- Kingdom: Animalia
- Phylum: Arthropoda
- Class: Insecta
- Order: Diptera
- Family: Culicidae
- Subfamily: Culicinae
- Tribe: Sabethini
- Genus: Tripteroides; Giles, 1904

= Tripteroides =

Genus of mosquitoes

Tripteroides is a genus of mosquitoes belonging to the family Culicidae. It is a large and complex assemblage of 122 species and 5 subgenera. Species are distributed from India to Japan, and south to Australia including the islands of southeast Asia and the South Pacific. The species comprising the genus are highly diverse, and the relationships among Tripteroides and Trichoproposon species remain unresolved as many characters overlap. The taxonomic status of this genus urgently needs revision to better understand the relationships among the species and to improve the classification of the genus.

== Species ==
=== Subgenus (Tripteroides) ===
- Tripteroides aeneus Edwards, 1921
- Tripteroides alboscutellatus Lee, 1946
- Tripteroides antennalis Bohart and Farner, 1944
- Tripteroides bambusa Yamada, 1917

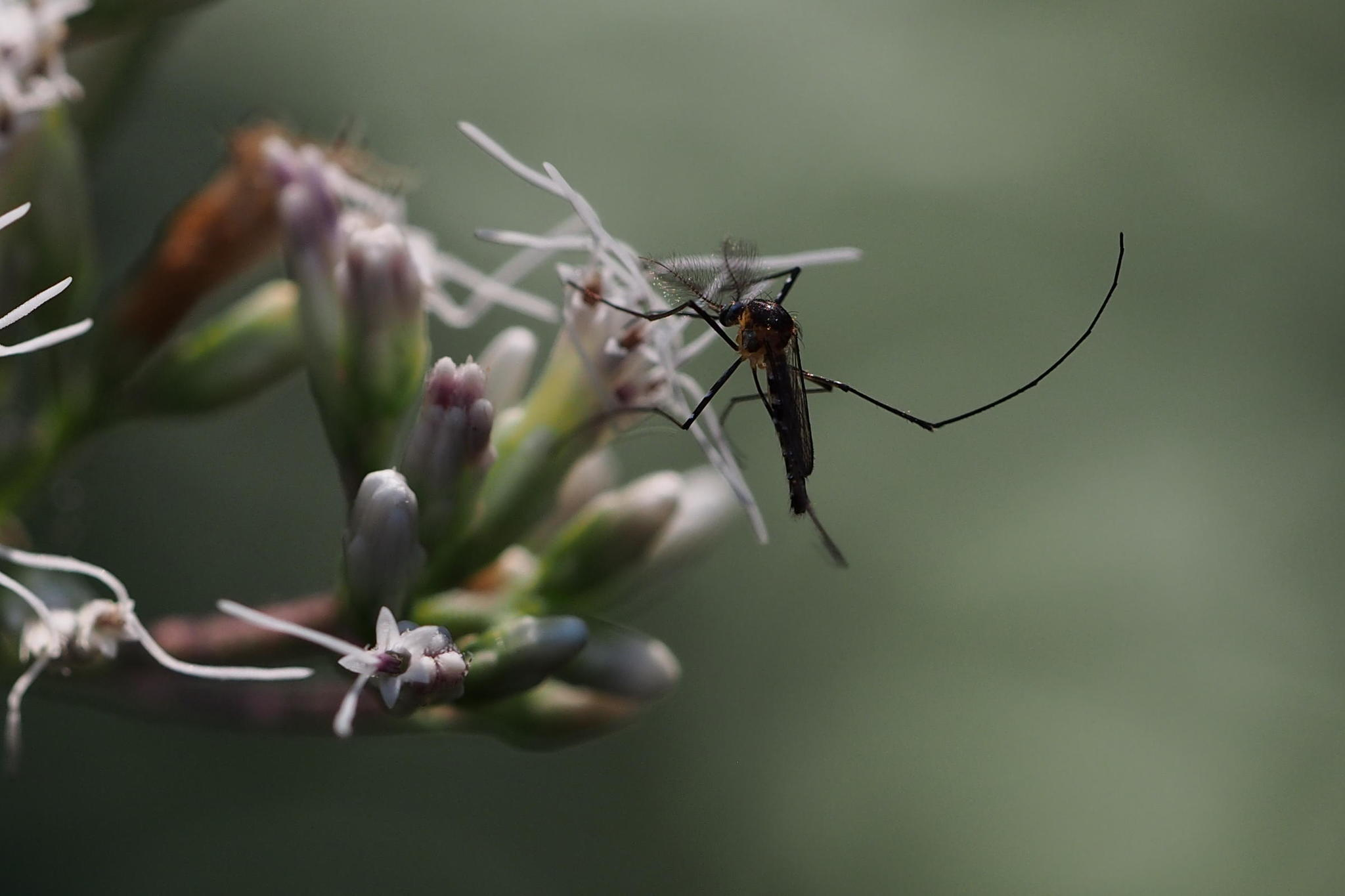
T. bambusa

- Tripteroides bimaculipes Theobald, 1905
- Tripteroides binotatus Belkin, 1950
- Tripteroides bonneti Belkin, 1962
- Tripteroides brevipalpis Brug, 1934
- Tripteroides caeruleocephalus Leicester, 1908
- Tripteroides cheni Lien, 1968
- Tripteroides claggi Bohart and Farner, 1944
- Tripteroides denticulatus Delfinado and Hodges, 1968
- Tripteroides distigma Edwards, 1925
- Tripteroides dyari Bohart and Farner, 1944
- Tripteroides dyi Baisas and Ubaldo-Pagayon, 1953
- Tripteroides elegans Brug, 1934
- Tripteroides erlindae Baisas and Ubaldo-Pagayon, 1953
- Tripteroides hoogstraali Baisas, 1947
- Tripteroides hybridus Leicester, 1908
- Tripteroides indeterminatus Baisas and Ubaldo-Pagayon, 1953
- Tripteroides indicus Barraud, 1929
- Tripteroides intermediatus Baisas and Ubaldo-Pagayon, 1953
- Tripteroides knighti Baisas and Ubaldo-Pagayon, 1953
- Tripteroides latispinus Gong and Ji, 1989
- Tripteroides lipovskyi Belkin, 1950
- Tripteroides littlechildi Edwards, 1930
- Tripteroides longisiphonus X. Dong, Zhou and L. Dong, 2001
- Tripteroides lorengaui Peters, 1963
- Tripteroides mabinii Baisas and Ubaldo-Pagayon, 1953
- Tripteroides magnesianus Edwards, 1924
- Tripteroides malayi Delfinado and Hodges, 1968
- Tripteroides malvari Baisas and Ubaldo-Pagayon, 1953
- Tripteroides mendacis Daniels, 1908
- Tripteroides monetifer Dyar, 1920
- Tripteroides nissanensis Lee, 1946
- Tripteroides nitidoventer Giles, 1904
- Tripteroides novohanoverae Peters, 1963
- Tripteroides plumosus Brug, 1931
- Tripteroides powelli Ludlow, 1909
- Tripteroides proximus Edwards, 1915
- Tripteroides purpuratus Edwards, 1921
- Tripteroides quasiornatus Taylor, 1915
- Tripteroides reiseni Basio, 1971
- Tripteroides riverai Miyagi, Toma and Tsukamoto, 1983
- Tripteroides similis Leicester, 1908
- Tripteroides simulatus Baisas and Ubaldo-Pagayon, 1953
- Tripteroides splendens Lee, 1946
- Tripteroides sullivanae Baisas and Ubaldo-Pagayon, 1953
- Tripteroides tarsalis Delfinado and Hodges, 1968
- Tripteroides toffaletii Baisas and Ubaldo-Pagayon, 1953
- Tripteroides uichancoi Baisas and Ubaldo-Pagayon, 1953
- Tripteroides vicinus Edwards, 1914

=== Subgenus (Polylepidomyia) ===
- Tripteroides altivallis Bonne-Wepster, 1948
- Tripteroides apicotriangulatus Theobald, 1910
- Tripteroides argenteiventris Theobald, 1905
- Tripteroides atripes Skuse, 1889
- Tripteroides caledonicus Edwards, 1922
- Tripteroides coheni Belkin, 1950
- Tripteroides collessi Lee, 1946
- Tripteroides digoelensis Brug, 1934
- Tripteroides floridensis Belkin, 1950
- Tripteroides folicola Belkin, 1955
- Tripteroides marksae Dobrotworsky, 1965
- Tripteroides melanesiensis Belkin, 1955
- Tripteroides microlepis Edwards, 1927
- Tripteroides perplexus Peters, 1963
- Tripteroides punctolateralis Theobald, 1903
- Tripteroides rotumanus Edwards, 1929
- Tripteroides solomonis Edwards, 1924
- Tripteroides standfasti Peters, 1959
- Tripteroides tasmaniensis Strickland, 1911

=== Subgenus (Rachionotomyia) ===
- Tripteroides affinis Edwards, 1913
- Tripteroides aranoides Theobald, 1901
- Tripteroides ceylonensis Theobald, 1905
- Tripteroides coonorensis Mattingly, 1981
- Tripteroides dofleini Guenther, 1913
- Tripteroides edwardsi Barraud, 1929
- Tripteroides longipalpis X. Dong, Zhou and L. Dong, 1997
- Tripteroides nepenthis Edwards, 1915
- Tripteroides nepenthisimilis Mattingly, 1981
- Tripteroides pallidothorax X. Dong, L. Dong and Wu, 2008
- Tripteroides ponmeki Miyagi and Toma, 2001
- Tripteroides rozeboomi Baisas and Ubaldo-Pagayon, 1953
- Tripteroides serratus Barraud, 1929
- Tripteroides tenax de Meijere, 1910
- Tripteroides sp. No. 2

=== Subgenus (Rachisoura) ===
- Tripteroides adentata van den Assem, 1959
- Tripteroides bisquamatus
- Tripteroides brevirhynchus Lee, 1946
- Tripteroides Brug 1934
- Tripteroides concinnus Lee, 1946
- Tripteroides confusus Lee, 1946
- Tripteroides cuttsi van den Assem, 1959
- Tripteroides exnebulis Bonne-Wepster, 1948
- Tripteroides felicitatis Bonne-Wepster, 1948
- Tripteroides filipes (Walker, 1861)
- Tripteroides flabelliger Bonne-Wepster, 1948
- Tripteroides fuliginosus Lee, 1946
- Tripteroides fuscipleura Lee, 1946
- Tripteroides kingi Lee, 1946
- Tripteroides latisquama (Edwards, 1927)
- Tripteroides leei Peters, 1959
- Tripteroides plumiger Bonne-Wepster, 1948
- Tripteroides simplex Brug, 1934
- Tripteroides stonei Belkin, 1950
- Tripteroides subnudipennis (Edwards, 1927)
- Tripteroides sylvestris (Theobald, 1910)
- Tripteroides tityae Sloof, 1961
- Tripteroides torokinae Belkin, 1950
- Tripteroides vanleeuweni (Edwards, 1927)

=== Subgenus (Tricholeptomyia) ===
- Tripteroides apoensis Baisas and Ubaldo-Pagayon, 1953
- Tripteroides barraudi Baisas and Ubaldo-Pagayon, 1953
- Tripteroides belkini Baisas and Ubaldo-Pagayon, 1953
- Tripteroides christophersi Baisas and Ubaldo-Pagayon, 1953
- Tripteroides delpilari Baisas and Ubaldo-Pagayon, 1953
- Tripteroides microcala (Dyar, 1929)
- Tripteroides nepenthicola (Banks, 1909)
- Tripteroides roxasi Baisas and Ubaldo-Pagayon, 1953
- Tripteroides werneri Baisas and Ubaldo-Pagayon, 1953
