= Aedes quasiferinus =

Scientific classification
- Kingdom: Animalia
- Phylum: Arthropoda
- Class: Insecta
- Order: Diptera
- Family: Culicidae
- Genus: Aedes
- Subgenus: Mucidus
- Species: A. quasiferinus

Binomial name
- Aedes quasiferinus Mattingly, 1961

Species of mosquito

Aedes (Muscidus) quasiferinus is a species complex of zoophilic mosquito belonging to the genus Aedes. It is found in Sri Lanka, Assam, Malaya, Thailand, Singapore and Indonesia.
