= Aedes chrysolineatus =

Scientific classification
- Kingdom: Animalia
- Phylum: Arthropoda
- Class: Insecta
- Order: Diptera
- Family: Culicidae
- Genus: Aedes
- Subgenus: Hulecoeteomyia
- Species: A. chrysolineatus

Binomial name
- Aedes chrysolineatus (Theobald, 1907)

Synonyms
- Culex ceylonica Theobald, 1910; Hulecoeteomyia trilineata Leicester, 1904

Species of mosquito

Aedes (Hulecoeteomyia) chrysolineatus is a species complex of zoophilic mosquito belonging to the genus Aedes. It is found in Sri Lanka, India, Japan, Malaya, Thailand, Indochina, Sumatra, and Java.
