= Verrallina yerburyi =

Scientific classification
- Kingdom: Animalia
- Phylum: Arthropoda
- Clade: Pancrustacea
- Class: Insecta
- Order: Diptera
- Family: Culicidae
- Genus: Aedes
- Species: A. yerburyi

Binomial name
- Aedes yerburyi (Edwards, 1917)

Species of fly

Aedes (Verrallina) yerburyi is a species complex of zoophilic mosquito belonging to the genus Aedes. It is endemic to Sri Lanka
