= Verrallina indica =

Scientific classification
- Kingdom: Animalia
- Phylum: Arthropoda
- Clade: Pancrustacea
- Class: Insecta
- Order: Diptera
- Family: Culicidae
- Genus: Aedes
- Species: A. indicus

Binomial name
- Aedes indicus (Theobald, 1907)

Species of fly

Aedes (Verrallina) indicus is a species complex of zoophilic mosquito belonging to the genus Aedes. It is found in India and Sri Lanka It is known to infect Japanese encephalitis.
