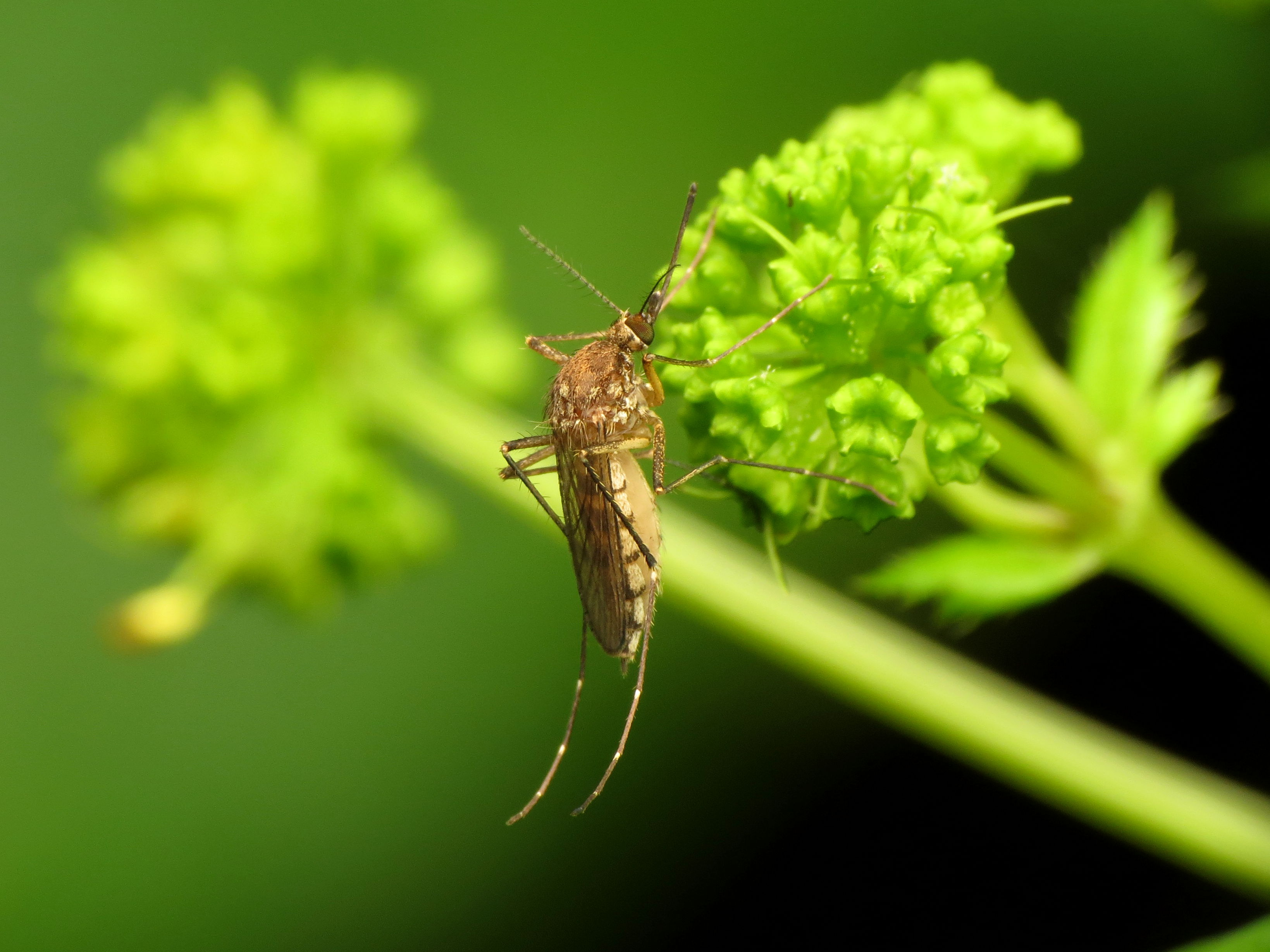

Scientific classification
- Kingdom: Animalia
- Phylum: Arthropoda
- Clade: Pancrustacea
- Class: Insecta
- Order: Diptera
- Family: Culicidae
- Genus: Aedes
- Subgenus: Aedimorphus
- Species: A. vexans

Binomial name
- Aedes vexans (Meigen), 1830

= Aedes vexans =

Species of mosquito

Aedes vexans, commonly known as the inland floodwater mosquito or tomguito, is a widespread and frequently encountered pest mosquito with a cosmopolitan distribution, occurring across North America, Europe, Asia, and Africa.

== Description ==
The adult female A. vexans is characterized by a bandless proboscis with white ventral scales, short, brown scales on the scutum, and B-shaped markings (when viewed from the side) on each abdominal tergite. Only females take blood meals, showing a preference for humans and cattle, while males feed exclusively on nectar, honeydew, and sap—sources that females also utilize, though infrequently. This species is commonly found in habitats such as grassy pools, partially shaded woodland pools, roadside ditches, and cultivated fields.

== Lifecycle ==
After a blood meal, the female A. vexans deposits her eggs in areas prone to flooding, where they remain dormant until inundated, triggering hatching. In temperate regions, larvae are present from April to September, and adults are active from May to October.

== Medical importance ==
A. vexans is a recognized vector for several pathogens:

- Dirofilaria immitis (dog heartworm), transmitted to canines.
- Tahyna virus, a Bunyaviridae virus affecting humans in Europe, causing fever that typically resolves within two days but may progress to encephalitis or meningitis in rare cases.
- Myxomatosis, a viral disease fatal to rabbits, though A. vexans’ role as a vector is less definitive and may be region-specific.
- West Nile virus, affects mainly birds, humans and horses; found in mosquitoes collected in the UK in 2023, published in May 2025.

In Europe, A. vexans is the predominant mosquito species, often accounting for over 80% of the mosquito population in certain areas, with abundance tied to floodwater availability. During summer, trap collections can yield up to 8,000 individuals per night. The species has demonstrated a higher transmission efficiency for Zika virus compared to A. aegypti, enhancing its potential as a vector in northern latitudes beyond the range of primary vectors A. aegypti and A. albopictus, due to its wide distribution, periodic high abundance, and aggressive human-biting behavior.

Additionally, A. vexans harbors insect-specific viruses, including Chaoyang virus and Aedes vexans Iflavirus, which do not affect humans or other vertebrates but are of interest in virological studies.
