= Aedes stenoetrus =

Scientific classification
- Kingdom: Animalia
- Phylum: Arthropoda
- Class: Insecta
- Order: Diptera
- Family: Culicidae
- Genus: Aedes
- Subgenus: Aedimorphus
- Species: A. stenoetrus

Binomial name
- Aedes stenoetrus (Theobald, 1907)

Synonyms
- Culex stenoetrus Theobald, 1907; Culex pseudostenoetrus Theobald, 1910

Species of mosquito

Aedes stenoetrus is a species of zoophilic mosquito in the subfamily Culicinae. It is found in Sri Lanka and southern India.
