= Aedes pallidostriatus =

Scientific classification
- Kingdom: Animalia
- Phylum: Arthropoda
- Class: Insecta
- Order: Diptera
- Family: Culicidae
- Genus: Aedes
- Subgenus: Aedimorphus
- Species: A. pallidostriatus

Binomial name
- Aedes pallidostriatus (Theobald, 1907)

Synonyms
- Culex parascelos Theobald, 1910

Species of mosquito

Aedes (Aedimorphus) pallidostriatus is a species complex of zoophilic mosquito belonging to the genus Aedes. It is found in Sri Lanka, Bangladesh, Malaysia, Thailand, India and Western Pakistan.
