= Aedes argenteoscutellatus =

Scientific classification
- Kingdom: Animalia
- Phylum: Arthropoda
- Class: Insecta
- Order: Diptera
- Family: Culicidae
- Genus: Aedes
- Subgenus: Aedimorphus
- Species: A. argenteoscutellatus

Binomial name
- Aedes argenteoscutellatus Carter & Wijesundara, 1948

Species of mosquito

Aedes argenteoscutellatus is a species of mosquito belonging to the subfamily Culicinae. It was first described by Carter and Wijesundara in 1948. It is endemic to Sri Lanka.
