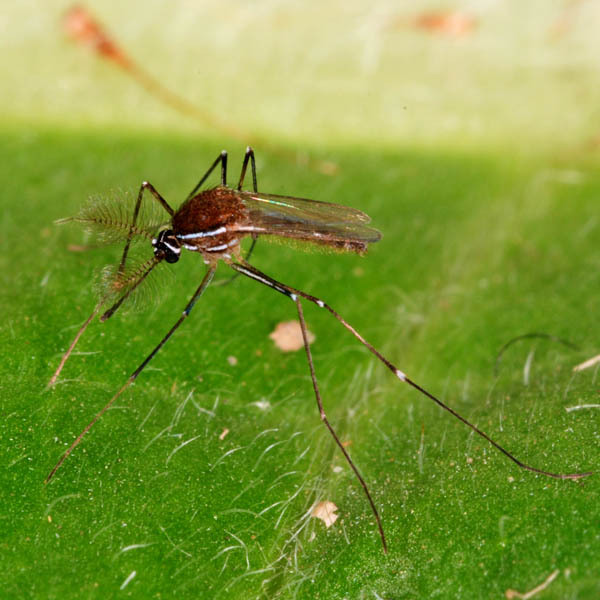
- Uranotaenia unguiculata, Hungary

Scientific classification
- Domain: Eukaryota
- Kingdom: Animalia
- Phylum: Arthropoda
- Class: Insecta
- Order: Diptera
- Family: Culicidae
- Tribe: Uranotaeniini
- Genus: Uranotaenia
- Subgenus: Pseudoficalbia; Theobald, 1912

= Pseudoficalbia =

Subgenus of flies

Pseudoficalbia is a subgenus of the mosquito genus Uranotaenia with 153 species. It was originally created as a genus by Frederick Vincent Theobald in 1911 (the name was applied again as new in 1912); however, it was later treated as a subgenus of Uranotaenia, and then was made a synonym of the same genus. It was later restored as a subgenus by E.L. Peyton in 1972.

== Species ==
The following species belong to the subgenus Pseudoficalbia.

- Uranotaenia abdita Peyton, 1977
- Uranotaenia abstrusa Peyton, 1977
- Uranotaenia albimanus da Cunha Ramos & Brunhes, 2004
- Uranotaenia albinotata da Cunha Ramos & Brunhes, 2004
- Uranotaenia albipes Peyton, 1977
- Uranotaenia ambodimanga da Cunha Ramos & Brunhes, 2004
- Uranotaenia andreae Doucet, 1962
- Uranotaenia anhydor anhydor Dyar, 1907
- Uranotaenia anhydor syntheta Dyar & Shannon, 1924
- Uranotaenia annulata Theobald, 1901
- Uranotaenia antalahaensis da Cunha Ramos & Brunhes, 2004
- Uranotaenia apicosquamata da Cunha Ramos & Brunhes, 2004
- Uranotaenia apicotaeniata Theobald, 1909
- Uranotaenia approximata Peyton, 1977
- Uranotaenia ascidiicola de Meijere, 1910
- Uranotaenia atra Theobald, 1905
- Uranotaenia bambusicola da Cunha Ramos & Brunhes, 2004
- Uranotaenia belkini Grjebine, 1979
- Uranotaenia bhutanensis Somboon, Nambay & Harbach, 2022
- Uranotaenia bicincta da Cunha Ramos & Brunhes, 2004
- Uranotaenia bicolor Leicester, 1908
- Uranotaenia bifasciata da Cunha Ramos & Brunhes, 2004
- Uranotaenia bimaculata Leicester, 1908
- Uranotaenia bosseri Grjebine, 1979
- Uranotaenia boussesi da Cunha Ramos & Brunhes, 2004
- Uranotaenia breviseta da Cunha Ramos & Brunhes, 2004
- Uranotaenia browni Mattingly, 1955 (in Mattingly & Brown, 1955)
- Uranotaenia brumpti Doucet, 1951
- Uranotaenia brunhesi Grjebine, 1979
- Uranotaenia cachani (Doucet, 1950)
- Uranotaenia capelai da Cunha Ramos, 1993
- Uranotaenia carcinicola da Cunha Ramos & Brunhes, 2004
- Uranotaenia cavernicola Mattingly, 1954
- Uranotaenia colocasiae Edwards, 1928
- Uranotaenia combesi (Doucet, 1950)
- Uranotaenia comorensis da Cunha Ramos & Brunhes, 2004
- Uranotaenia confusa Peyton, 1977
- Uranotaenia contrastata da Cunha Ramos & Brunhes, 2004
- Uranotaenia cornuta da Cunha Ramos & Brunhes, 2004
- Uranotaenia damasei Grjebine, 1979
- Uranotaenia dandakaranyensis Natarajan, Rajavel & Jambulingam, 2017
- Uranotaenia demeilloni Peyton & Rattanarithikul, 1970
- Uranotaenia devemyi Hamon, 1955
- Uranotaenia diagonalis Brug, 1934
- Uranotaenia dibrugarhensis Bhattacharyya, Prakash, Mohapatra & Mahanta, 2004
- Uranotaenia donai da Cunha Ramos & Brunhes, 2004
- Uranotaenia douceti Grjebine, 1953
- Uranotaenia enigmatica Peyton, 1977
- Uranotaenia fulgens da Cunha Ramos & Brunhes, 2004
- Uranotaenia fusca Theobald, 1907
- Uranotaenia garnhami van Someren, 1948
- Uranotaenia gigantea Brug, 1931
- Uranotaenia gouldi Peyton & Klein, 1970
- Uranotaenia grenieri Doucet, 1951
- Uranotaenia grjebinei da Cunha Ramos & Brunhes, 2004
- Uranotaenia haddowi da Cunha Ramos & Brunhes, 2004
- Uranotaenia harrisoni Peyton, 1977
- Uranotaenia henrardi Edwards, 1935
- Uranotaenia henriquei da Cunha Ramos, 1993
- Uranotaenia hervyi da Cunha Ramos & Brunhes, 2004
- Uranotaenia hirsuta Boussès & Brunhes, 2013
- Uranotaenia hirsutifemora Peters, 1964
- Uranotaenia hongayi Galliard & Ngu, 1947
- Uranotaenia husaini Qutubuddin, 1947
- Uranotaenia jacksoni Edwards, 1935
- Uranotaenia jinhongensis Dong, Dong & Zhou, 2003
- Uranotaenia koli Peyton & Klein, 1970
- Uranotaenia kraussi Grjebine, 1953
- Uranotaenia laffosseae da Cunha Ramos & Brunhes, 2004
- Uranotaenia lavieri Doucet, 1950
- Uranotaenia legoffi da Cunha Ramos & Brunhes, 2004
- Uranotaenia leiboensis Chu, 1981
- Uranotaenia longitubus da Cunha Ramos & Brunhes, 2004
- Uranotaenia lousthei Boussès & Brunhes, 2013
- Uranotaenia lucyae van Someren, 1954
- Uranotaenia lui Lien, 1968
- Uranotaenia lunda da Cunha Ramos, 1993
- Uranotaenia luteola Edwards, 1934 (in Barraud, 1934)
- Uranotaenia lutescens Leicester, 1908
- Uranotaenia maculipleura Leicester, 1908
- Uranotaenia madagascarensis da Cunha Ramos & Brunhes, 2004
- Uranotaenia maikalensis Natarajan, Rajavel & Jambulingam, 2017
- Uranotaenia manakaraensis da Cunha Ramos & Brunhes, 2004
- Uranotaenia mashonaensis Theobald, 1901
- Uranotaenia mattinglyi Qutubuddin, 1951
- Uranotaenia maxima Leicester, 1908
- Uranotaenia mengi Chen, Wang & Zhao, 1989
- Uranotaenia micromelas Edwards, 1934
- Uranotaenia modesta Leicester, 1908
- Uranotaenia montana Ingram & de Meillon, 1927
- Uranotaenia moufiedi Peyton, 1977
- Uranotaenia moultoni Edwards, 1914
- Uranotaenia musarum Edwards, 1936
- Uranotaenia nepenthes (Theobald, 1912)
- Uranotaenia nigricephala da Cunha Ramos & Brunhes, 2004
- Uranotaenia nigripes (Theobald, 1905)
- Uranotaenia nigripleura da Cunha Ramos & Brunhes, 2004
- Uranotaenia nigromaculata Edwards, 1941
- Uranotaenia nivipleura Leicester, 1908
- Uranotaenia nivipous Theobald, 1912
- Uranotaenia nocticola Peyton, 1977
- Uranotaenia novobscura novobscura Barraud, 1934
- Uranotaenia novobscura ryukyuana Tanaka, Mizusawa & Saugstad, 1979
- Uranotaenia obscura Edwards, 1915
- Uranotaenia ohamai Tanaka, Mizusawa & Saugstad, 1975
- Uranotaenia ornata Theobald, 1909
- Uranotaenia ototomo da Cunha Ramos, 1993
- Uranotaenia painei Edwards, 1935
- Uranotaenia pallidipleura da Cunha Ramos & Brunhes, 2004
- Uranotaenia pandani (Theobald, 1912)
- Uranotaenia patriciae Peyton, 1977
- Uranotaenia pauliani Doucet, 1949
- Uranotaenia pilosa da Cunha Ramos & Brunhes, 2004
- Uranotaenia principensis da Cunha Ramos, 1993
- Uranotaenia propinqua Peyton, 1977
- Uranotaenia pseudoalbimanus da Cunha Ramos & Brunhes, 2004
- Uranotaenia pseudohenrardi Peters, 1955
- Uranotaenia pseudomaculipleura Peyton & Rattanarithikul, 1970
- Uranotaenia pseudoshillitonis da Cunha Ramos & Brunhes, 2004
- Uranotaenia pseudostricklandi Natarajan, Rajavel & Jambulingam, 2018
- Uranotaenia pylei Baisas, 1946
- Uranotaenia quadrimaculata Edwards, 1929 (in Paine & Edwards, 1929)
- Uranotaenia quasimodesta Peyton, 1977
- Uranotaenia qui Dong, Dong & Zhou, 2003
- Uranotaenia quinquemaculata Bonne-Wepster, 1934
- Uranotaenia ramosa da Cunha Ramos, 1993
- Uranotaenia ravenalaphila Boussès & Brunhes, 2013
- Uranotaenia ravenalicola da Cunha Ramos & Brunhes, 2004
- Uranotaenia recondita Edwards, 1922
- Uranotaenia reinerti Peyton, 1977
- Uranotaenia rickenbachi da Cunha Ramos, 1993
- Uranotaenia rossi Delfinado, 1966
- Uranotaenia ryukyuana Tanaka, Mizusawa & Saugstad, 1979
- Uranotaenia satpuraensis Natarajan, Rajavel & Jambulingam, 2017
- Uranotaenia scutostriata da Cunha Ramos & Brunhes, 2004
- Uranotaenia shillitonis Edwards, 1932
- Uranotaenia signata da Cunha Ramos, 1993
- Uranotaenia spiculosa Peyton & Rattanarithikul, 1970
- Uranotaenia spinitubus da Cunha Ramos & Brunhes, 2004
- Uranotaenia spinosa da Cunha Ramos & Brunhes, 2004
- Uranotaenia spiraculata da Cunha Ramos & Brunhes, 2004
- Uranotaenia srilankensis Peyton, 1974
- Uranotaenia stricklandi Barraud, 1926
- Uranotaenia sumethi Peyton & Rattanarithikul, 1970
- Uranotaenia syntheta Dyar & Shannon, 1924
- Uranotaenia tanakai Miyagi & Tome, 2013
- Uranotaenia tanzaniae da Cunha Ramos, 1993
- Uranotaenia tricolor da Cunha Ramos & Brunhes, 2004
- Uranotaenia tridentata da Cunha Ramos & Brunhes, 2004
- Uranotaenia tsaratananae Doucet, 1950
- Uranotaenia ugandae da Cunha Ramos, 1993
- Uranotaenia unguiculata pefflyi Stone, 1961
- Uranotaenia unguiculata unguiculata Edwards, 1913
- Uranotaenia xanthomelaena Edwards, 1925
- Uranotaenia yaeyamana Tanaka, Mizusawa & Saugstad, 1975
- Uranotaenia yovani van Someren, 1951
