= Anopheles aitkenii =

Scientific classification
- Kingdom: Animalia
- Phylum: Arthropoda
- Class: Insecta
- Order: Diptera
- Family: Culicidae
- Genus: Anopheles
- Subgenus: Anopheles
- Species: A. aitkenii

Binomial name
- Anopheles aitkenii James, 1903

Species of mosquito

Anopheles aitkenii is a species of mosquito belonging to the genus Anopheles. The species group (Reid and Knight, 1961) is composed of forest forms with small unornamented brown adults, where the females usually indistinguishable. Female feed on vertebrate blood and known to cause simian malaria and filariasis.
