= Aedes niveus =

Scientific classification
- Kingdom: Animalia
- Phylum: Arthropoda
- Clade: Pancrustacea
- Class: Insecta
- Order: Diptera
- Family: Culicidae
- Genus: Aedes
- Subgenus: Downsiomyia
- Species: A. niveus

Binomial name
- Aedes niveus (Ludlow, 1903)

Synonyms
- Downsiomyia nivea (Ludlow, 1903); Stegomyia niveus Ludlow, 1903

Species of mosquito

Aedes (Downsiomyia) niveus is the nominotypical species of a species complex of zoophilic mosquito belonging to the genus Aedes. It is found in Sri Lanka, India, Vietnam and other South East Asian countries. It is a vector of filariasis.
