= Aedes harveyi =

Scientific classification
- Kingdom: Animalia
- Phylum: Arthropoda
- Class: Insecta
- Order: Diptera
- Family: Culicidae
- Genus: Aedes
- Subgenus: Hulecoeteomyia
- Species: A. harveyi

Binomial name
- Aedes harveyi (Barraud, 1923)

Synonyms
- Aedes mikiranus Edwards, 1922

Species of mosquito

Aedes (Hulecoeteomyia) harveyi is a species complex of zoophilic mosquito belonging to the genus Aedes. It is found in Sri Lanka, Cambodia, Indonesia, Nepal, India, Thailand, China, Sumatra, Vietnam, and Malaya.
