= Aedes pseudotaeniatus =

Scientific classification
- Kingdom: Animalia
- Phylum: Arthropoda
- Class: Insecta
- Order: Diptera
- Family: Culicidae
- Genus: Aedes
- Subgenus: Collessius
- Species: A. pseudotaeniatus

Binomial name
- Aedes pseudotaeniatus (Giles, 1901)

Species of mosquito

Aedes (Collessius) pseudotaeniatus is a species complex of zoophilic mosquito belonging to subgroup III of Alloeomyia group E in subgenus Finlaya of the genus Aedes. It is found in Sri Lanka, India, Cambodia, Bangladesh, Pakistan, Thailand, Nepal and Myanmar.

== Description ==
Adult can be distinguished by an anterior narrow, longitudinal line of pale scales on the tibiae and narrow scales on the scutellum.
