= Anopheles reidi =

Scientific classification
- Kingdom: Animalia
- Phylum: Arthropoda
- Class: Insecta
- Order: Diptera
- Family: Culicidae
- Genus: Anopheles
- Subgenus: Anopheles
- Species: A. reidi

Binomial name
- Anopheles reidi Harrison, 1973

Species of mosquito

Anopheles (Anopheles) reidi is a species complex of barbirostris mosquito belonging to the genus Anopheles. It is endemic to Sri Lanka.
