= Anopheles barbumbrosus =

Scientific classification
- Kingdom: Animalia
- Phylum: Arthropoda
- Class: Insecta
- Order: Diptera
- Family: Culicidae
- Genus: Anopheles
- Subgenus: Anopheles
- Species: A. barbumbrosus

Binomial name
- Anopheles barbumbrosus Strickland & Chowdhury, 1927

Species of mosquito

Anopheles barbumbrosus is a species complex of mosquito belonging to the genus Anopheles. It has 12-36 thin attenuated branches usually loose and separated out, which is a good indication to separate it from A. barbirostris. It shows a marked zoophilic tendency, thus is a malaria vector, but with minor importance to humans. It is distributed throughout Peninsular Malaysia, Sumatra, Java, Thailand, India and Sri Lanka, They mostly live as an outdoor mosquito species, rarely found indoor places. Larva can be found in a variety of habitats including both partially shaded and sunlit fresh and slowly running water, grass-fringed streams to stagnant water pools and man-made places like rice fields.
