= Mimomyia chamberlaini =

Scientific classification
- Kingdom: Animalia
- Phylum: Arthropoda
- Clade: Pancrustacea
- Class: Insecta
- Order: Diptera
- Family: Culicidae
- Genus: Mimomyia
- Species: M. chamberlaini

Binomial name
- Mimomyia chamberlaini Ludlow, 1904

Synonyms
- Conopomyia metallica Leicester, 1908

Species of mosquito

Mimomyia (Mimomyia) chamberlaini is a species of zoophilic mosquito belonging to the genus Mimomyia. It is found in Sri Lanka, Philippines, Hainan Island, Celebes, Java Malaya, Thailand, Myanmar, and Australia.
