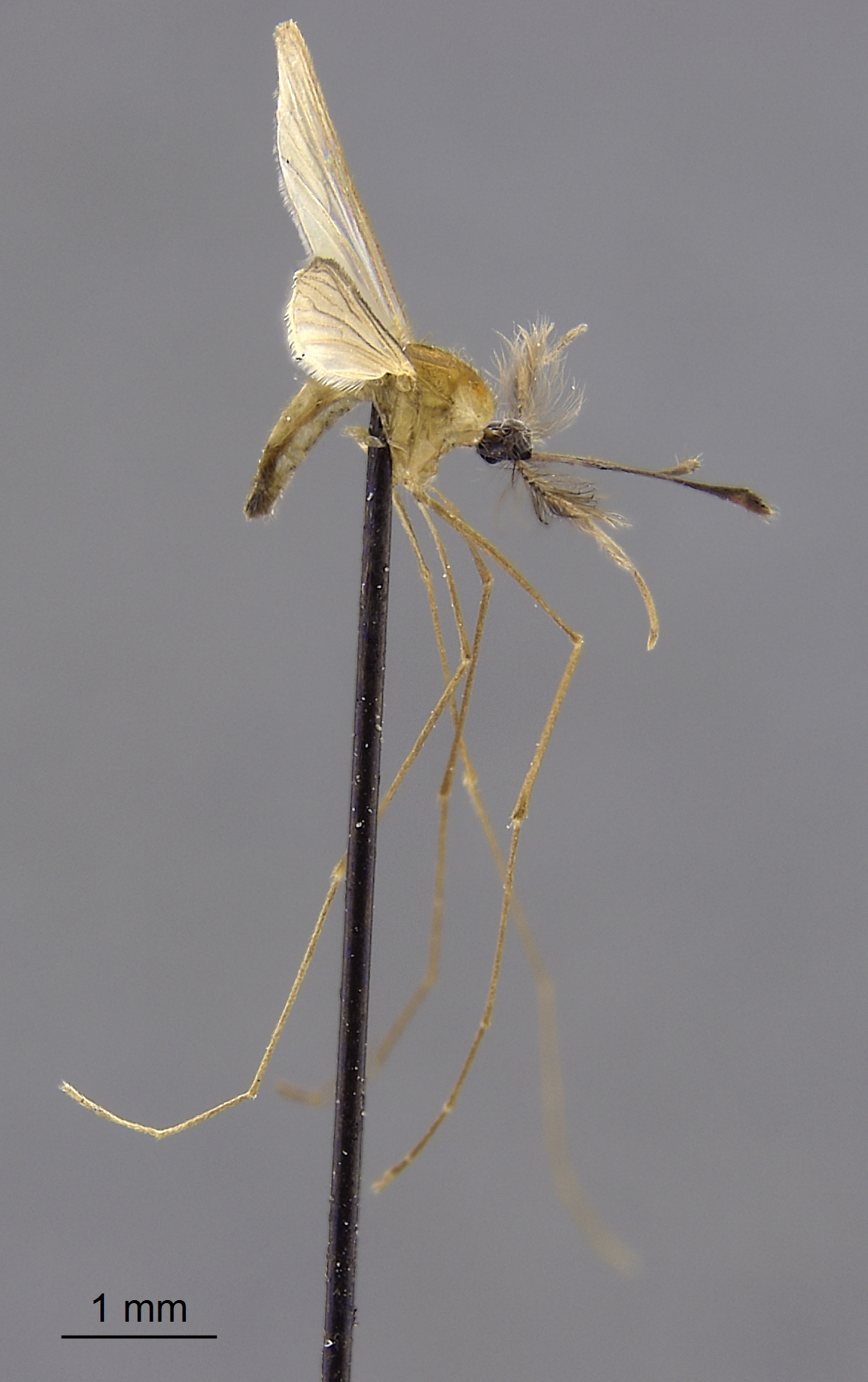
- Preserved specimens of A. insulaeflorum

Scientific classification
- Kingdom: Animalia
- Phylum: Arthropoda
- Class: Insecta
- Order: Diptera
- Family: Culicidae
- Genus: Anopheles
- Subgenus: Anopheles
- Species: A. insulaeflorum

Binomial name
- Anopheles insulaeflorum (Swellengrebel & Swellengrebel de Graaf, 1919)

= Anopheles insulaeflorum =

Species of mosquito

Anopheles insulaeflorum is a species complex of mosquito belonging to the genus Anopheles. It is found in India, Sri Lanka, Cambodia, China, Indonesia, Malaysia, Myanmar, Philippines, Taiwan, Thailand, and Vietnam.
