= Uranotaenia srilankensis =

Scientific classification
- Domain: Eukaryota
- Kingdom: Animalia
- Phylum: Arthropoda
- Class: Insecta
- Order: Diptera
- Family: Culicidae
- Genus: Uranotaenia
- Subgenus: Pseudoficalbia
- Species: U. srilankensis

Binomial name
- Uranotaenia srilankensis Payton, 1974

Species of mosquito

Uranotaenia (Pseudoficalbia) srilankensis is a species of zoophilic mosquito belonging to the genus Uranotaenia. It is endemic to Sri Lanka, and first documented from Peradeniya.
