= Hodgesia bailyi =

Scientific classification
- Domain: Eukaryota
- Kingdom: Animalia
- Phylum: Arthropoda
- Class: Insecta
- Order: Diptera
- Family: Culicidae
- Genus: Hodgesia
- Species: H. bailyi

Binomial name
- Hodgesia bailyi Barraud, 1929

Species of mosquito

Hodgesia bailyi is a species of zoophilic mosquito belonging to the genus Hodgesia. It is found in Sri Lanka, India, Cambodia, Thailand, and Vietnam.
