= Ficalbia minima =

Scientific classification
- Kingdom: Animalia
- Phylum: Arthropoda
- Class: Insecta
- Order: Diptera
- Family: Culicidae
- Genus: Ficalbia
- Species: F. minima

Binomial name
- Ficalbia minima (Theobald, 1901)

Synonyms
- Mimomyia minuta Theobald, 1908

Species of fly

Ficalbia minima is a species complex of zoophilic mosquito belonging to the genus Ficalbia. It is found in Sri Lanka, India, Malaya, Singapore, Java, Borneo, New Guinea, and China.
