= Tripteroides aranoides =

Scientific classification
- Kingdom: Animalia
- Phylum: Arthropoda
- Class: Insecta
- Order: Diptera
- Family: Culicidae
- Genus: Tripteroides
- Species: T. aranoides

Binomial name
- Tripteroides aranoides (Theobald, 1901)

Synonyms
- Skeiromyia fusca Leicester, 1908; Squamomyia inornata Theobald, 1910; Tripteroides szechwanensis Hsu, 1964

Species of mosquito

Tripteroides (Rachionotomyia) aranoides is a species of zoophilic mosquito belonging to the genus Tripteroides. It is found in India, Sri Lanka Bangladesh, Cambodia, China, Indonesia, Laos, Malaysia, Myanmar, Nepal, Singapore, Taiwan, Thailand, and Vietnam.
