= Sydney Price James =

British physician (1870-1946)

Lieutenant Colonel Sydney Price James CMG FRS
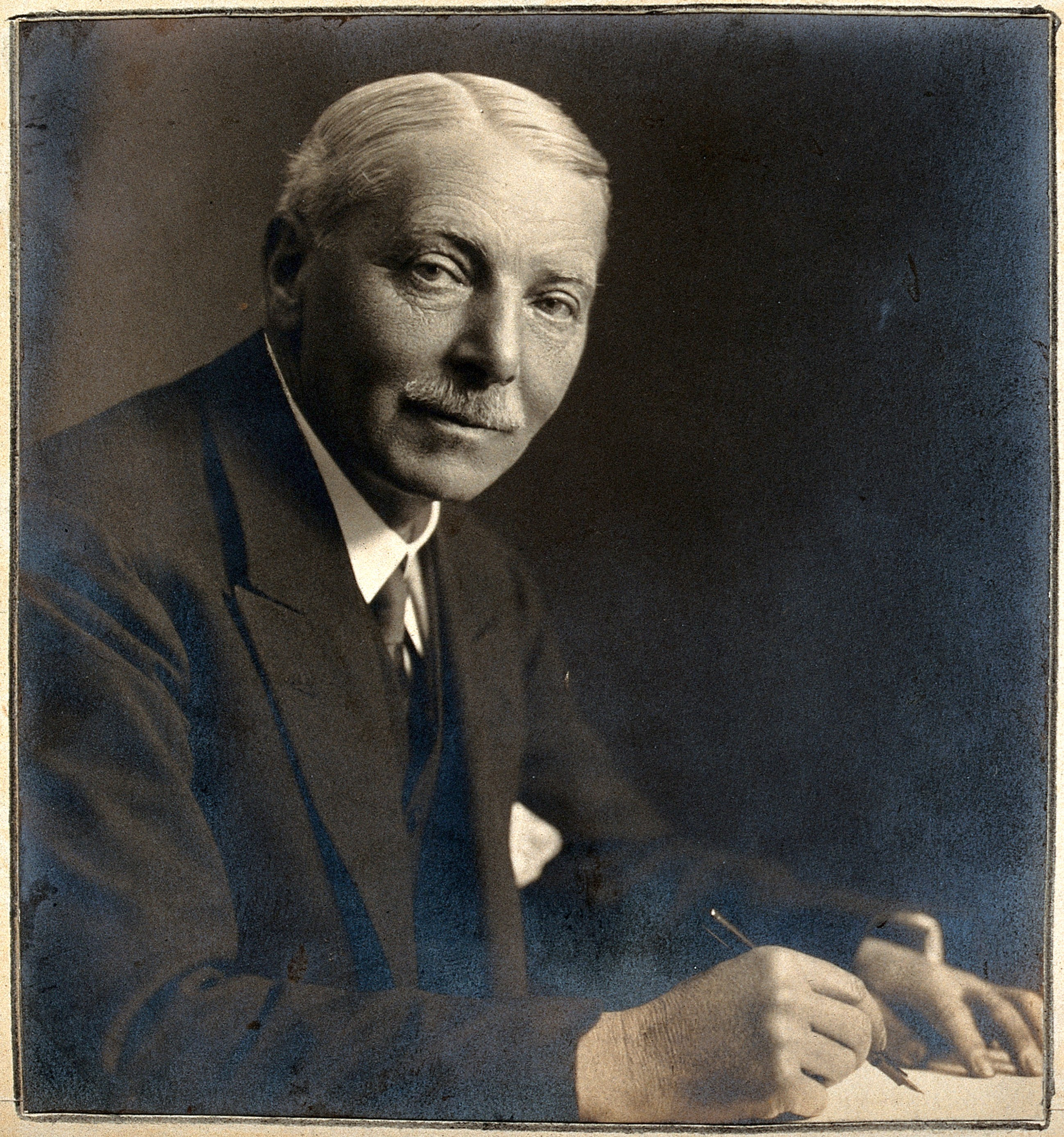
- S.P. James, c. 1930
- Born: 17 September 1870; Highgate, London, England
- Died: 17 April 1946 (aged 75)
- Occupation: Physician
- Spouse: Lisa Marles
- Parents: Thomas Edward James (father); Margaret Price (mother)
- Military career
- Allegiance: United Kingdom
- Branch: British Army
- Service years: -
- Rank: Lieutenant Colonel
- Unit: 19th Madras Infantry
- Conflicts: Boxer uprising

Lieutenant Colonel Sydney Price James CMG FRS (17 September 1870 – 17 April 1946) was a British physician, parasitologist, and malariologist who served in the Indian Medical Service.

== Life and work ==
James was born at Highgate to the Hereford family of Thomas Edward and Margaret, daughter of Rev. George Price. As a child he read books on travel and adventure and took a keen interest in outdoors natural history. An older brother went to South Africa with the navy and died from malaria in 1900, another was a keen photographer who invented Velox paper, and still another became a farmer in Rhodesia. He went to study medicine at Guy's Hospital but a scholarship at St Mary's Hospital made him move and he graduated in 1895. He joined the Indian Medical Service in 1896 and trained at Netley before reaching Bombay. He was posted in Waziristan in 1897 to deal with a plague outbreak and later joined the Tochi Valley Expedition during which he was invalided by typhoid back to England. During this break, he married Lisa Marles, daughter of Rev. W. Thomas of Cardiganshire who had studied at the Royal College of Music. He returned to India to work at the Military Hospital in Secunderabad and later as a medical officer with the 19th Madras Infantry.

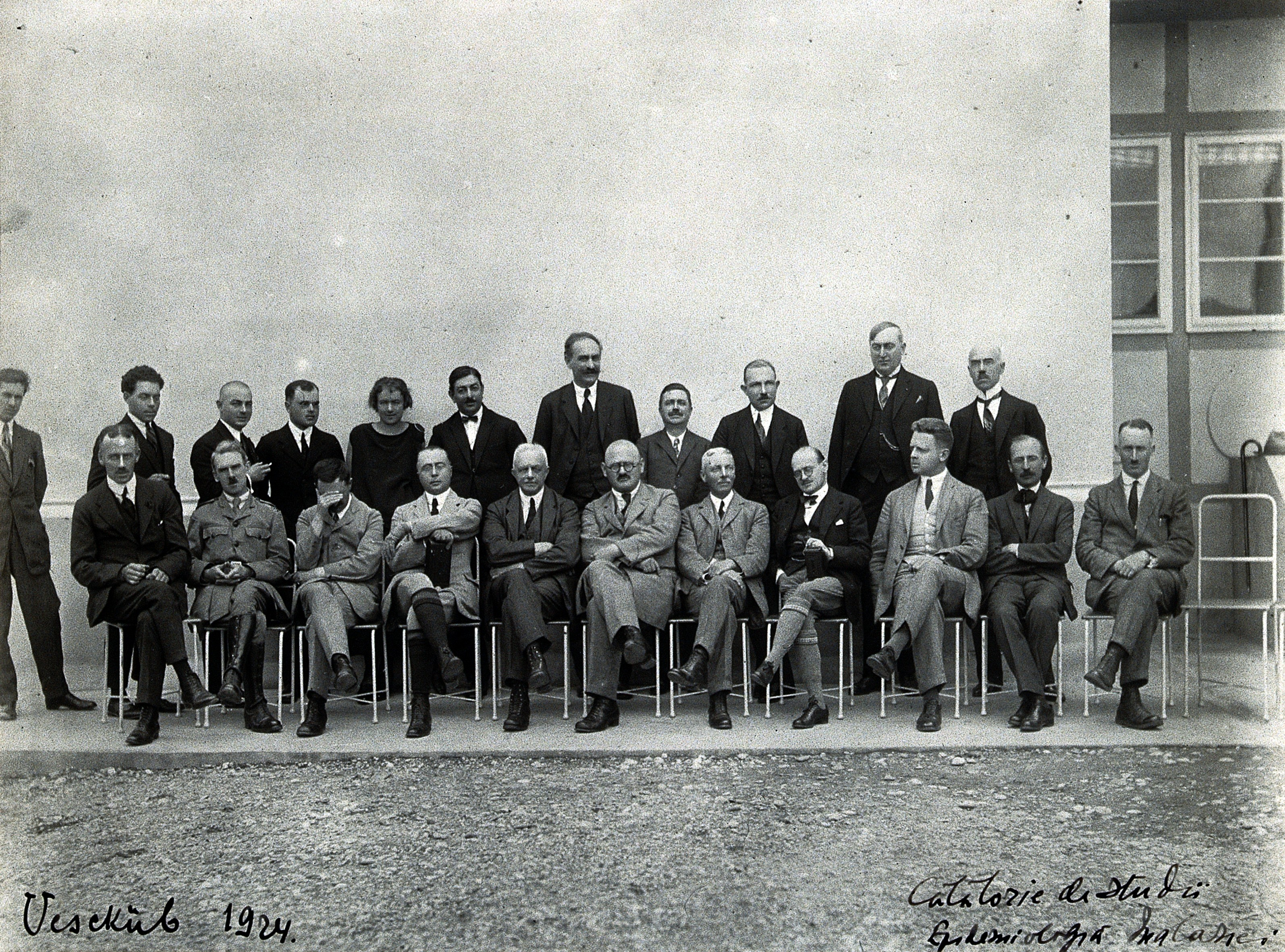
James, seated seventh from left in 1924 with other members of the Malaria Commission of the League of Nations.

James took an interest in research on filariasis when posted in Quilon, Travancore. He independently determined the transmission of filiaria by mosquitoes. In 1900, during the Boxer uprising, he was posted to the China Expeditionary Force Hospital at Shan-hai-Kwan and then Pekin. In 1901 he joined the Malaria Commission along with J.W.W. Stephens and C.W. Daniels in Calcutta. The Commission then moved to Nagpur, Jeypore, and Madras before returning to Lahore. In 1903 he became a Statistical Officer at Simla from where he worked on annual reports and several major publications including the Causation and prevention of malarial fevers, Smallpox and vaccination in British India and continued to work on mosquitoes. When the Panama Canal opened in 1910 he was put in charge of measures to prevent the entry of yellow fever into India which included visits to ports around the world. Along with S.R. Christophers, J.W.T. Leslie, and D. Semple, he founded the journal Paludism in 1910. In 1916 he was put in charge of organizing the sanitary services in Mesopotamia during the war. In 1920 he was involved in the establishment of the Malaria Therapy Centre at Horton. In 1927 he was a member of the Fletcher Committee to reorganize medical research in India. He retired from the Indian service in 1918 and joined the ministry of health, living for much of the time afterwards in London and later at Bosham. In 1936 he retired from the ministry of health and worked at the Molteno Institute at Cambridge.

James was elected Fellow of the Royal Society in 1931 and was a Prix Darling Laureate of the League of Nations (1934) and made CMG in 1935.
