= Mimomyia luzonensis =

Scientific classification
- Kingdom: Animalia
- Phylum: Arthropoda
- Class: Insecta
- Order: Diptera
- Family: Culicidae
- Genus: Mimomyia
- Species: M. luzonensis

Binomial name
- Mimomyia luzonensis (Ludlow, 1905)

Synonyms
- Aedes clavirostris Stone & Bohart, 1944; Etorleptiomyia completiva Leicester, 1908

Species of mosquito

Mimomyia (Mimomyia) luzonensis is a species of zoophilic mosquito belonging to the genus Mimomyia. It is found in Sri Lanka Bangladesh, Cambodia, China, Hong Kong, India, Indonesia, Japan, Malaysia, Myanmar, Nepal, Pakistan, Philippines, Singapore, Taiwan, Thailand, and Vietnam.
