= Mimomyia intermedia =

Scientific classification
- Kingdom: Animalia
- Phylum: Arthropoda
- Class: Insecta
- Order: Diptera
- Family: Culicidae
- Genus: Mimomyia
- Species: M. intermedia

Binomial name
- Mimomyia intermedia Barraud, 1929

Species of mosquito

Mimomyia (Mimomyia) intermedia is a species of zoophilic mosquito belonging to the genus Mimomyia. It is found in Sri Lanka Nepal, Vietnam and India.
