= Verrallina pseudomediofasciata =

Scientific classification
- Kingdom: Animalia
- Phylum: Arthropoda
- Clade: Pancrustacea
- Class: Insecta
- Order: Diptera
- Family: Culicidae
- Genus: Verrallina
- Subgenus: Neomacleaya
- Species: V. pseudomediofasciata

Binomial name
- Verrallina pseudomediofasciata (Theobald, 1910)

Species of mosquito

Verrallina pseudomediofasciata is a species of mosquito in the genus Verrallina. It was first described by Frederick Vincent Theobald in 1910. Based on the known distribution of the genus Verrallina, this species is likely found in tropical regions, including Southeast Asia and northeastern Australia.

== Ecology and behavior ==
Verrallina pseudomediofasciata is presumed to breed in temporary jungle ground waters, such as flood pools, puddles, and animal hoof prints, consistent with the habits of other species in the genus.

== Medical significance ==
There is currently no clear evidence that Verrallina pseudomediofasciata acts as a vector for human diseases. While some species within the genus Verrallina have been associated with viruses such as Barmah Forest and Ross River virus in Australia, the role of V. pseudomediofasciata in disease transmission remains poorly studied and undocumented.
