= Orthopodomyia anopheloides =

Scientific classification
- Domain: Eukaryota
- Kingdom: Animalia
- Phylum: Arthropoda
- Class: Insecta
- Order: Diptera
- Family: Culicidae
- Genus: Orthopodomyia
- Species: O. anopheloides

Binomial name
- Orthopodomyia anopheloides (Giles, 1903)

Synonyms
- Orthopodomyia lemmonae Thurman, 1959; Orthopodomyia maculata Theobald, 1910; Orthopodomyia maculipes Theobald, 1910; Orthopodomyia manganus Baisas, 1946; Orthopodomyia nigritarsis Leicester, 1908; Orthopodomyia nipponica LaCasse & Yamaguti, 1948

Species of mosquito

Orthopodomyia anopheloides is a species of zoophilic mosquito belonging to the genus Orthopodomyia. It is found in Andaman Islands, Sri Lanka, Cambodia, China, India, Indonesia, Japan, Malaysia, Nepal, Pakistan, Philippines, Singapore, Taiwan, Thailand, and Vietnam.
