= Culex halifaxi =

Scientific classification
- Kingdom: Animalia
- Phylum: Arthropoda
- Class: Insecta
- Order: Diptera
- Family: Culicidae
- Genus: Culex
- Species: C. halifaxi

Binomial name
- Culex halifaxi (Becnel and Sweeney, 1990)

Species of mosquito

Culex (Lutzia) halifaxi is a species of mosquito belonging to the genus Culex. It is found in Australia, New Zealand, Indonesia and Sri Lanka

The parasite Amblyospora trinus was discovered from this mosquito. It is found in Australia. Larvae are predatory and cannibalistic, they can be found in clear waters with grassy banks.
