= Orthopodomyia flavithorax =

Scientific classification
- Domain: Eukaryota
- Kingdom: Animalia
- Phylum: Arthropoda
- Class: Insecta
- Order: Diptera
- Family: Culicidae
- Genus: Orthopodomyia
- Species: O. flavithorax

Binomial name
- Orthopodomyia flavithorax (Barraud, 1927)

Species of mosquito

Orthopodomyia flavithorax is a species of zoophilic mosquito belonging to the genus Orthopodomyia. It is found in India, and Sri Lanka.
