= Heizmannia carteri =

Scientific classification
- Kingdom: Animalia
- Phylum: Arthropoda
- Clade: Pancrustacea
- Class: Insecta
- Order: Diptera
- Family: Culicidae
- Genus: Heizmannia
- Subgenus: Heizmannia
- Species: H. carteri

Binomial name
- Heizmannia carteri Amerasinghe, 1993

Species of fly

Heizmannia (Heizmannia) carteri is a species complex of zoophilic mosquito belonging to the genus Heizmannia. It is endemic to Sri Lanka.
