= Heizmannia greenii =

Scientific classification
- Kingdom: Animalia
- Phylum: Arthropoda
- Clade: Pancrustacea
- Class: Insecta
- Order: Diptera
- Family: Culicidae
- Genus: Heizmannia
- Subgenus: Heizmannia
- Species: H. greenii

Binomial name
- Heizmannia greenii (Theobald, 1905)

Species of fly

Heizmannia (Heizmannia) greenii is a species complex of zoophilic mosquito belonging to the genus Heizmannia. It is found in Sri Lanka, India, Malaya, Cambodia, Laos, Nepal, Philippines, Vietnam, Thailand, Indochina, China, and Borneo.
