= Uranotaenia obscura =

Scientific classification
- Domain: Eukaryota
- Kingdom: Animalia
- Phylum: Arthropoda
- Class: Insecta
- Order: Diptera
- Family: Culicidae
- Genus: Uranotaenia
- Subgenus: Pseudoficalbia
- Species: U. obscura

Binomial name
- Uranotaenia obscura Edwards, 1915

Synonyms
- Uranotaenia papua Brug; Uranotaenia philippinensis Delfinado

Species of mosquito

Uranotaenia (Pseudoficalbia) obscura is a species of zoophilic mosquito belonging to the genus Uranotaenia. It is found in Sri Lanka, Australia, Cambodia, India, Indonesia, Malaysia, New Guinea, Papua New Guinea, Philippines, Singapore, and Thailand. The species can found from undersides of banana leaves.
