= Mimomyia hybrida =

Scientific classification
- Kingdom: Animalia
- Phylum: Arthropoda
- Class: Insecta
- Order: Diptera
- Family: Culicidae
- Genus: Mimomyia
- Species: M. hybrida

Binomial name
- Mimomyia hybrida (Leicester, 1908)

Species of mosquito

Mimomyia (Mimomyia) hybrida is a species of zoophilic mosquito belonging to the genus Mimomyia. It is found in Sri Lanka, Malaya, Singapore, Sumatra, Java, Borneo, Philippines, and Thailand.
