= Anopheles interruptus =

Scientific classification
- Kingdom: Animalia
- Phylum: Arthropoda
- Class: Insecta
- Order: Diptera
- Family: Culicidae
- Genus: Anopheles
- Subgenus: Anopheles
- Species: A. interruptus

Binomial name
- Anopheles interruptus Puri, 1929

Species of mosquito

Anopheles interruptus is a species complex of mosquito belonging to the genus Anopheles. It is found in India, Sri Lanka, Borneo, Brunei, Cambodia, China, Malaysia, Nepal, Thailand, and Vietnam.
