= Malaya genurostris =

Scientific classification
- Kingdom: Animalia
- Phylum: Arthropoda
- Clade: Pancrustacea
- Class: Insecta
- Order: Diptera
- Family: Culicidae
- Genus: Malaya
- Species: M. genurostris

Binomial name
- Malaya genurostris Leicester, 1908

Synonyms
- Harpagomyia caeruleovittata Ludlow, 1911

Species of mosquito

Malaya genurostris is a species complex of zoophilic mosquito belonging to the genus Malaya. It is found in Sri Lanka, India, Malaysia, Bangladesh, Cambodia, China, Myanmar, Taiwan, Thailand, Maldives, Indonesia, Nepal, Philippines, Singapore, Australia, and Irian Jaya (Indonesia).
