= Uranotaenia nivipleura =

Scientific classification
- Domain: Eukaryota
- Kingdom: Animalia
- Phylum: Arthropoda
- Class: Insecta
- Order: Diptera
- Family: Culicidae
- Genus: Uranotaenia
- Subgenus: Pseudoficalbia
- Species: U. nivipleura

Binomial name
- Uranotaenia nivipleura Leicester, 1908

Synonyms
- Uranotaenia loshanensis Wang and Feng

Species of mosquito

Uranotaenia (Pseudoficalbia) nivipleura is a species of zoophilic mosquito belonging to the genus Uranotaenia. It is found in India, Sri Lanka, Hong Kong, Australia, China, Indonesia, Laos, Malaysia, Nepal, Singapore, Taiwan, Thailand and Vietnam.
