= Uranotaenia bicolor =

Scientific classification
- Domain: Eukaryota
- Kingdom: Animalia
- Phylum: Arthropoda
- Class: Insecta
- Order: Diptera
- Family: Culicidae
- Genus: Uranotaenia
- Subgenus: Pseudoficalbia
- Species: U. bicolor

Binomial name
- Uranotaenia bicolor Leicester, 1908

Synonyms
- Uranotaenia fusca Leicester, 1908; Uranotaenia kalabahensis Haga., 1925; Uranotaenia lagunensis Baisas., 1935; Uranotaenia leicesteri Edwards, 1913

Species of mosquito

Uranotaenia (Pseudoficalbia) bicolor is a species of mosquito belonging to the genus Uranotaenia. It is found in Thailand, Sri Lanka, Cambodia, China, India, Indonesia, Malaysia, Nepal, Philippines and Vietnam.
