= Tripteroides affinis =

Scientific classification
- Kingdom: Animalia
- Phylum: Arthropoda
- Class: Insecta
- Order: Diptera
- Family: Culicidae
- Genus: Tripteroides
- Species: T. affinis

Binomial name
- Tripteroides affinis (Edwards, 1913)

Synonyms
- Phoniomyia caeruleocephala Theobald, 1910

Species of mosquito

Tripteroides (Rachionotomyia) affinis is a species of zoophilic mosquito belonging to the genus Tripteroides. It is found in India, Sri Lanka and Thailand.
