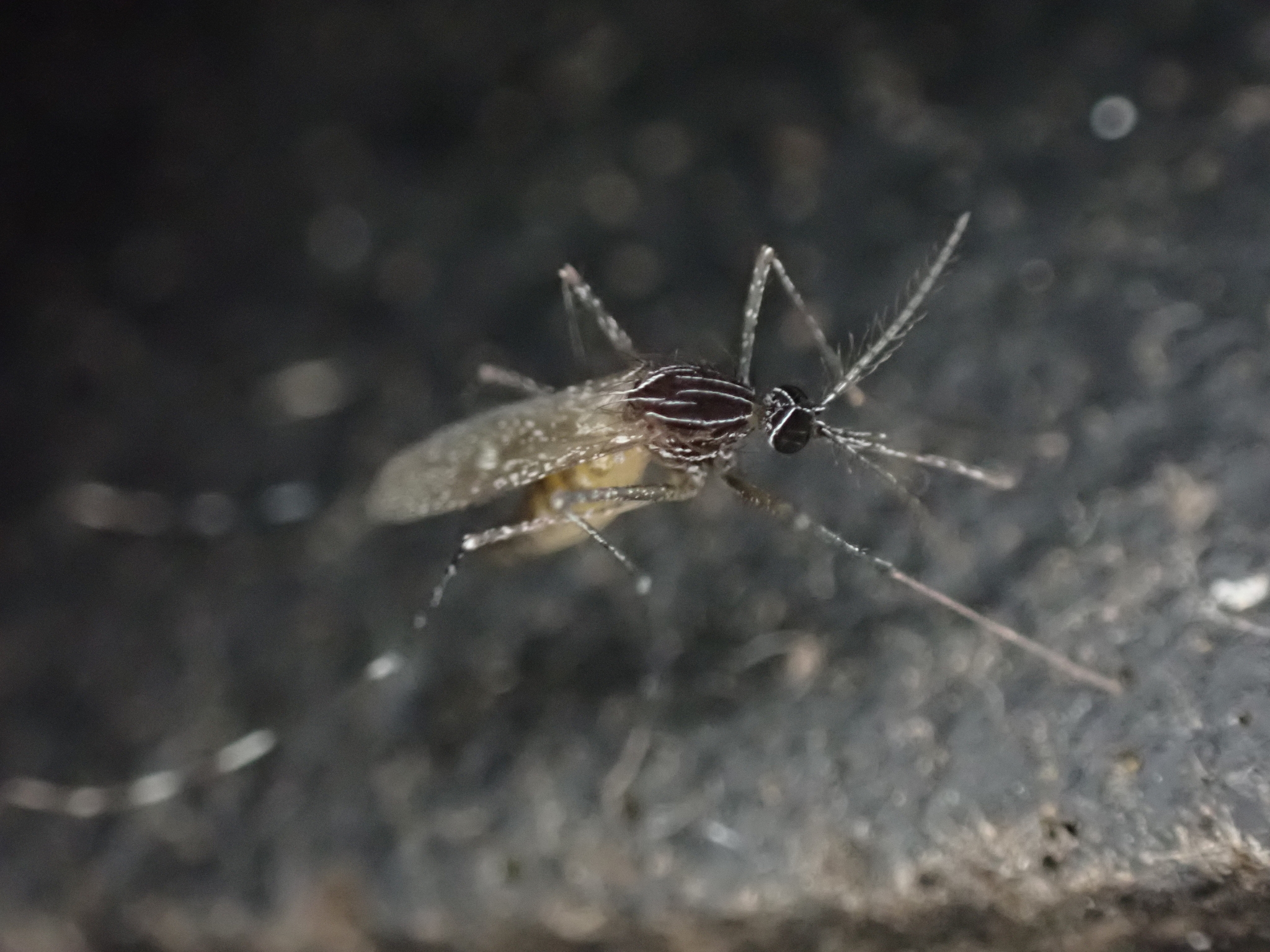

Scientific classification
- Domain: Eukaryota
- Kingdom: Animalia
- Phylum: Arthropoda
- Class: Insecta
- Order: Diptera
- Family: Culicidae
- Genus: Orthopodomyia
- Species: O. signifera

Binomial name
- Orthopodomyia signifera (Coquillett, 1896)

Synonyms
- Culex signifer Coquillett, 1896; Orthopodomyia californica Bohart, 1950

= Orthopodomyia signifera =

Species of fly

Orthopodomyia signifera is a species of mosquito in the family Culicidae.
