= Tripteroides dofleini =

Scientific classification
- Kingdom: Animalia
- Phylum: Arthropoda
- Class: Insecta
- Order: Diptera
- Family: Culicidae
- Genus: Tripteroides
- Species: T. dofleini

Binomial name
- Tripteroides dofleini (Guenther, 1913)

Species of mosquito

Tripteroides (Ficalbia) dofleini is a species of zoophilic mosquito belonging to the genus Tripteroides. It is endemic to Sri Lanka
