= Hodgesia malayi =

Scientific classification
- Domain: Eukaryota
- Kingdom: Animalia
- Phylum: Arthropoda
- Class: Insecta
- Order: Diptera
- Family: Culicidae
- Genus: Hodgesia
- Species: H. malayi

Binomial name
- Hodgesia malayi Leicester, 1908

Synonyms
- Hodgesia ampyx Dyar, 1920

Species of mosquito

Hodgesia malayi is a species of zoophilic mosquito belonging to the genus Hodgesia. It is found in Sri Lanka, India, Malaya, Indochina, Philippines, Moluccas, Thailand, and Maluku.
