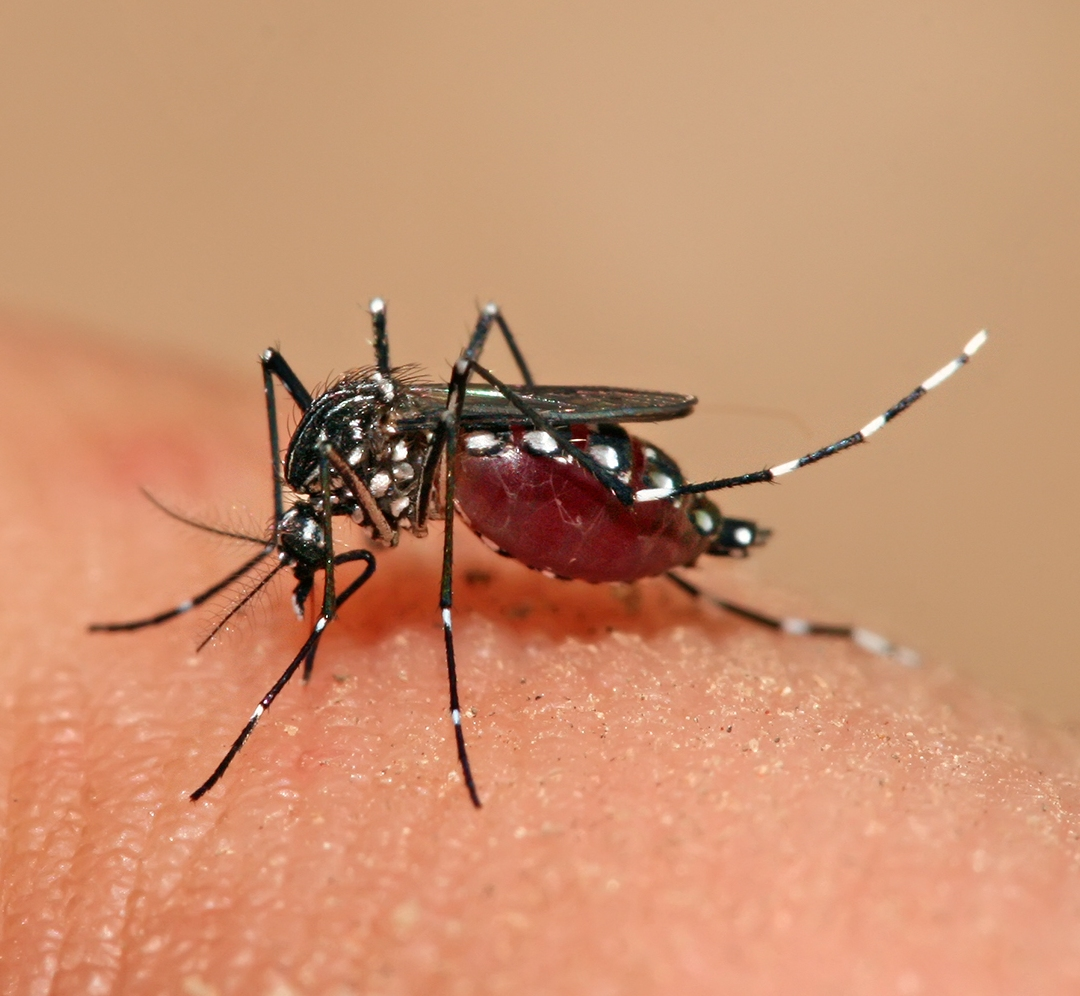
- Aedes aegypti

Scientific classification
- Kingdom: Animalia
- Phylum: Arthropoda
- Clade: Pancrustacea
- Class: Insecta
- Order: Diptera
- Family: Culicidae
- Tribe: Aedini
- Genus: Aedes; Meigen, 1818

Type species
- Aedes cinereus Meigen, 1818

Species
- List of Aedes species

= Aedes =

Genus of mosquitoes

Aedes (also known as the tiger mosquito or colloquially "dengue mosquito") is a genus of mosquitoes originally found in tropical and subtropical zones, but now found on all continents except Antarctica. Some species have been spread by human activity: Aedes albopictus, a particularly invasive species native to Southeast Asia, was spread to the Americas, including the United States, in the 1980s, by the used-tire trade.

It was first described and named by German entomologist Johann Wilhelm Meigen in 1818; the generic name comes from Ancient Greek ἀηδής (aēdēs), meaning 'unpleasant' or 'odious'. The type species for Aedes is Aedes cinereus.

== Systematics and phylogeny ==
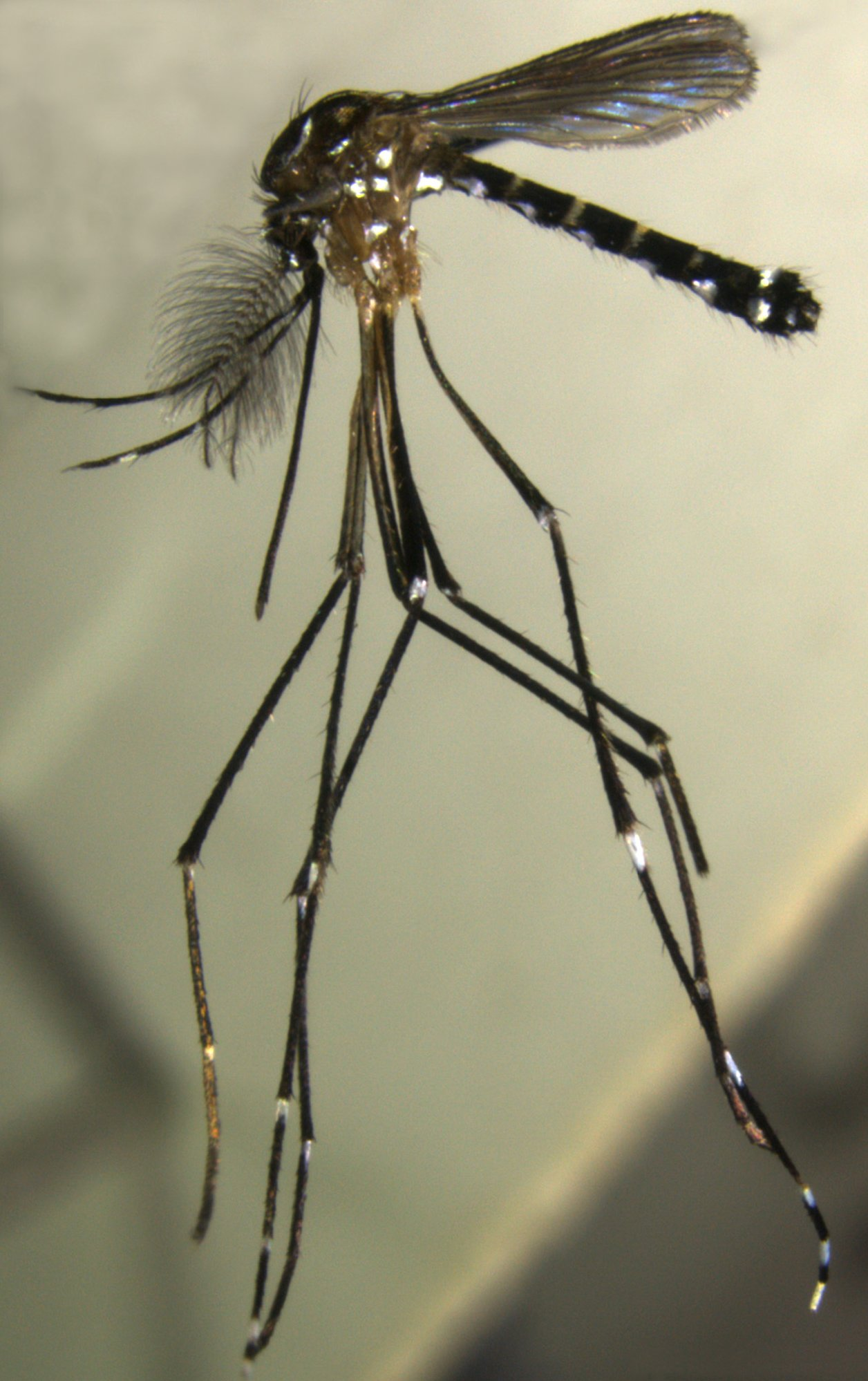
Aedes (Stegomyia) pia, described in 2013.

The genus was named by Johann Wilhelm Meigen in 1818. The generic name comes from the Ancient Greek ἀηδής, aēdēs, meaning 'unpleasant' or 'odious'.

As historically defined, the genus contains more than 950 species (see the list of Aedes species). The genus has been divided into several subgenera (Aedes, Diceromyia, Finlaya, Stegomyia, etc.), most of which have been recently treated by some authorities as full genera. The classification was revised in 2009.

== Characteristics ==
Aedes mosquitoes are visually distinctive because they have noticeable black and white banding and/or patches on their bodies and legs. Unlike most other mosquitoes, they are active and bite only during the daytime. The peak biting periods are early in the morning and in the evening before dusk.

== As disease vectors ==
Members of the genus Aedes are known vectors for numerous viral infections, including dengue fever, yellow fever, the Zika virus, and chikungunya, which are transmitted by species in the subgenus Stegomyia such as A. aegypti and A. albopictus. Infections with these viruses are typically accompanied by a fever, and in some cases, encephalitis, which can lead to death. A vaccine to provide protection from yellow fever exists, and measures to prevent mosquito bites include insecticides such as DDT, mosquito traps, insect repellents, mosquito nets, and pest control using genetically modified insects. In Polynesia, the species Aedes polynesiensis is responsible for the transmission of human lymphatic filariasis.

Aedes can be detected and monitored by ovitraps.

== Sequencing ==
The genome of the yellow fever mosquito (Aedes aegypti) was sequenced by the Broad Institute and the Institute for Genomic Research. The initial assembly was released in August 2005; a draft sequence of the genome and preliminary analysis was published in June 2007. The annotated genome is available at VectorBase. An updated and improved version of the Aedes aegypti genome was released in 2018.

== See also ==
- List of Aedes species
